= Gates House (Machiasport, Maine) =

Historic house in Maine, United States

- U.S. National Register of Historic Places
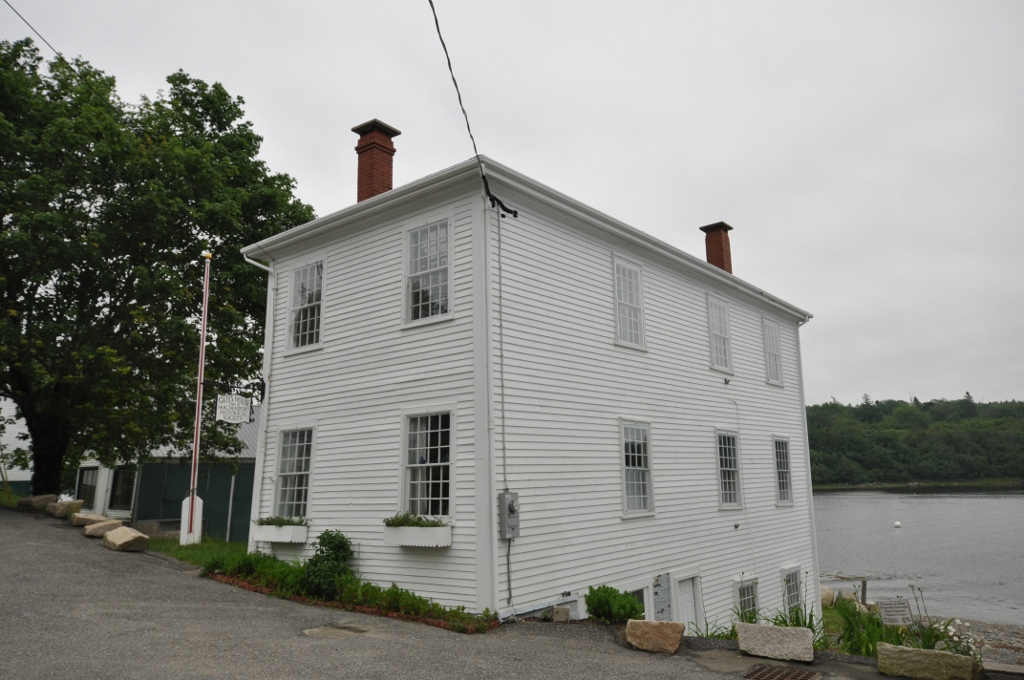

- Location within Maine Location within the United States
- Location: ME 92, Machiasport, Maine
- Coordinates: 44°41′49″N 67°23′38″W
- Area: 2 acres (0.81 ha)
- Built: 1807
- Built by: Nathan Phinney Sr.
- Architectural style: Federal
- NRHP reference No.: 75000115
- Added to NRHP: April 28, 1975

The Gates House is a historic house museum at 344 Port Road (Maine State Route 92) in Machiasport, Maine. Built in 1807, it is a remarkably high-quality Federal period house built in what was then a frontier area. The house is now owned by the Machiasport Historical Society, which uses it as its headquarters and museum. It was listed on the National Register of Historic Places in 1975.

== Description and history ==
The Gates House is located between Port Road and the Machias River in the village center of Machiasport, a short way south of Liberty Hall. It is set on a steeply sloping lot directly on the bank of the river, presenting two stories to the street and three to the river. It is an L-shaped wood-frame structure, with a hip roof and clapboard siding. The main entrance is set near the crook of the L, flanked by pilasters and topped by an entablature. Windows are small-paned sash, with minimally decorative surrounds, and there are three chimneys. The interior has seen much alteration over the building's history, and only the first floor room layout approximates the original configuration. There are no fireplaces.

When the house was built in 1807, it was one of the few houses in the immediate area. It was probably built by Nathaniel Phinney, Sr., and was purchased by Nathan Gates in 1813. Gates operated wharves adjacent to the house, which became a transshipment point for lumber arriving on the Whitneyville Railroad and sent to market via coasting schooners. The house remained in the hands of the Gates family until 1929. In 1966 it was acquired by the Machiasport Historical Society, which uses it as its headquarters and museum.

== See also ==
- National Register of Historic Places listings in Washington County, Maine
