= Porter Memorial Library =

Porter Memorial Library may refer to:

- Porter Memorial Library (Maine) in Machias, Maine
- Porter Memorial Library (Massachusetts) in Blandford, Massachusetts
