= Families Belong Together =

Advocacy campaign and protests In US

- Part of Protests against Trump administration family separation policy and protests against Donald Trump

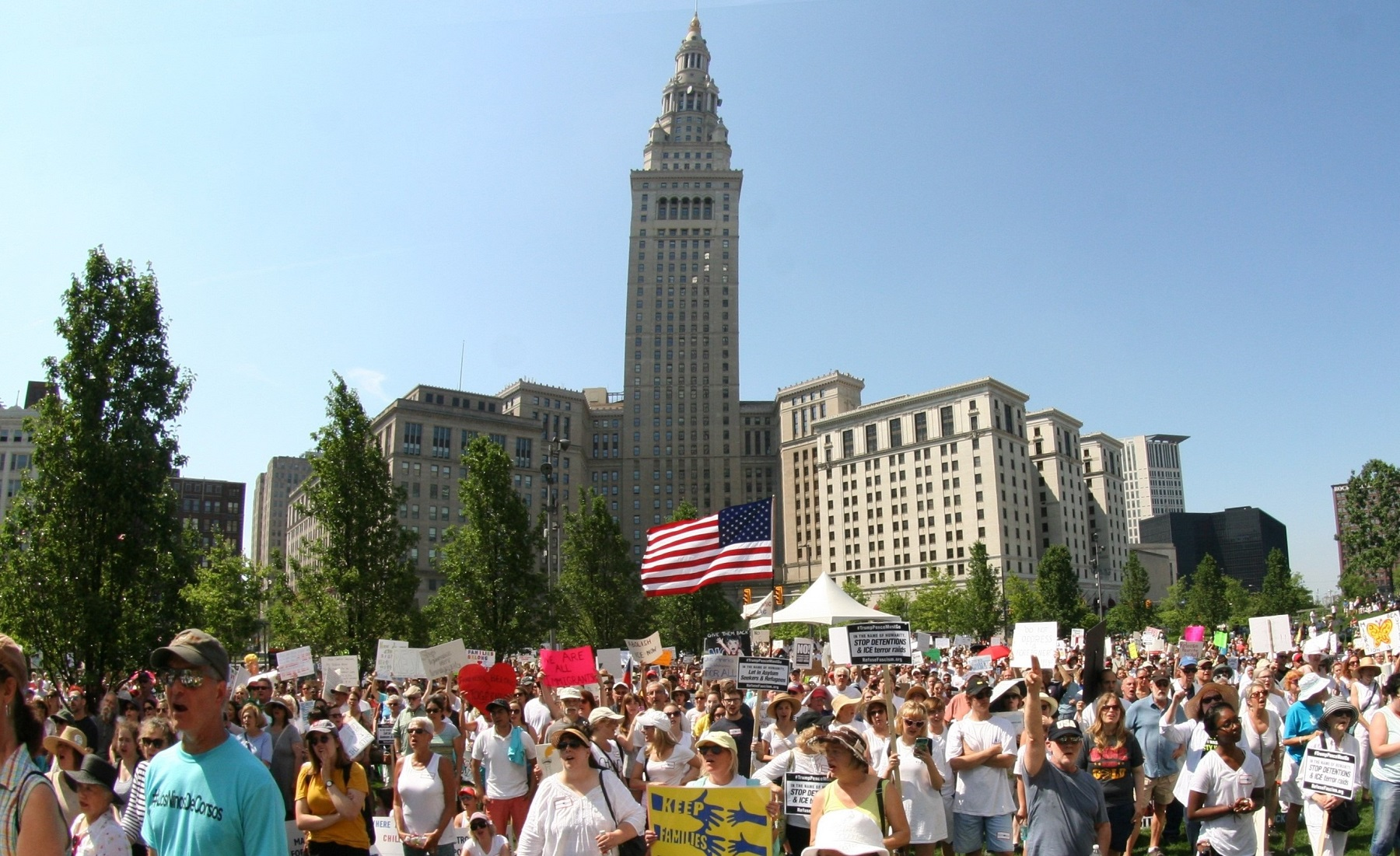
- Date: June 30, 2018
- Location: Washington, D.C. and over 700 other U.S. cities, and others worldwide
- Type: Demonstration (protest)
- Theme: Opposition to family separation
- Cause: Trump administration family separation policy
- Organized by: grassroots support and Families Belong Together
- Participants: protesters across the United States and some globally
- Website: www.familiesbelongtogether.org

Families Belong Together refers both to an advocacy campaign devoted to reuniting immigrant families that were separated at the US-Mexico border by a Trump administration policy introduced in spring 2018, and also specifically to a series of protests on June 30, 2018 in Washington, D.C., New York City, and 700 other cities and towns in the United States. Very large crowds turned out to those events despite heat waves in many areas, including in Washington, D.C.

== History ==
The "zero tolerance" policy introduced by the Trump Administration in spring 2018 was the immediate catalyst for the Families Belong Together mass mobilization in June 2018, as media outlets began reporting on children being held in cages and in detention facilities after having been separated from their parents or guardians after crossing the border. The news organization Pro Publica released widely circulated audio of one group of children crying. As public shock and outrage grew, a small group of women activists, advocates, and public officials began conferring to organize a public response, including Anna Galland, then Executive Director at MoveOn Civic Action; Jessica Morales Rocketto, then Political Director of the National Domestic Workers Alliance; Congresswoman Pramila Jayapal (D. Wash.); and Ai-jen Poo, Executive Director of the National Domestic Workers Alliance. That group's organizing led to a call for peaceful protests on Saturday, June 30, 2018, and hundreds of thousands of people turned out for those events.

== Participants ==
Many of those protesting in June 2018 had participated in previous anti-Trump protests and actions, while others were new to immigration activism, with parents who felt called into action based on the reported stories of separations. Protesters at the events in June 2018 participated in both major cities and also more rural regions like Appalachia and Wyoming. Protests were also held internationally. Some protesters compared the detainment of children by the U.S. government to the Nazi concentration camps.

=== Support from celebrities and other public figures ===
A number of prominent public figures spoke out around the time of the June 2018 protests to criticize the Trump Administration's policy. Former First Lady Laura Bush issued a statement saying the policy "broke her heart."

Celebrities who appeared at protests around the country included:

- Washington DC: Lin-Manuel Miranda, America Ferrera, Alicia Keys, Diane Guerrero
- Los Angeles: Laura Dern, Mira Sorvino, Chrissy Teigen, John Legend, Lea Thompson, Patton Oswalt, Laverne Cox, Chadwick Boseman, David Arquette
- New York City: Kerry Washington, Alysia Reiner, Amy Schumer, Padma Lakshmi, Vincent D'Onofrio, Carrie Coon, Alec Baldwin, Ellen Page
- San Francisco: Joan Baez

=== Counter-protests ===
At some of the locations there were counter protesters, resulting in at least one arrest. A counter-protester was arrested at Huntsville, Alabama after displaying a gun, and reportedly stating "I will shoot everyone here." In Phoenix, Arizona, about 25 counter-protesters from patriot movement proclaimed their opposition to the protests using signs and a megaphone, and engaging others at the protests near Arizona State Capitol, while the event remained mostly peaceful.

== Locations ==
=== United States ===
- AL
- AK
- AZ
- AR
- CA
- CO
- CT
- DC
- DE
- FL
- GA
- HI
- ID
- IL
- IN
- IA
- KS
- KY
- LA
- ME
- MD
- MA
- MI
- MN
- MS
- MO
- MT
- NE
- NV
- NH
- NJ
- NM
- NY
- NC
- ND
- OH
- OK
- OR
- PA
- RI
- SC
- SD
- TN
- TX
- UT
- VT
- VA
- WA
- WV
- WI
- WY

State	Cities	Estimated participants	Photo	Locations/Notes
Washington, D.C.		30,000 - 50,000		During this rally, most of the country was entering the first day of the first major summer heat wave of 2018, with temperatures ranging between high 90s and triple digits for various cities. Rally organizers cautioned people to use plenty of sunscreen and drink water; a few hundred yards away from the stage in Lafayette Square, a fire truck sprayed its hose in the air to cool off the crowd.
Alabama	Auburn	100		Toomer's Corner
Alabama	Birmingham	2,000		Kelly Ingram Park
Alabama	Dothan	several dozen		Westgate Park (near Angel of Hope Statue). US congressional candidate Tabitha Isner spoke at the rally.
Alabama	Huntsville	100		Big Spring Park. A right wing heckler was arrested for brandishing a gun at the crowd of protesters.
Alabama	Mobile	dozens		Public Safety Memorial Park
Alabama	Montgomery	hundreds		Capitol Sidewalk, Dexter Ave
Alaska	Anchorage	hundreds		Delaney Park Strip
Alaska	Fairbanks	200		Golden Heart Plaza
Alaska	Juneau	400		Capital Park
Alaska	Ketchikan	dozens		Berth 4 Ketchikan dock - Federal Building
Alaska	Kodiak	30+		main downtown intersection; grassy triangle at the Y
Alaska	Sitka	150		Crescent Harbor Shelter and the streets of Sitka
Alaska	Valdez	7		outside A Rogue's Garden
Arizona	Bisbee	30+		Lowell School parking lot
Arizona	Chandler			2600 S. Price Road
Arizona	Flagstaff	1,000		Flagstaff City Hall. Flagstaff Mayor Coral Evans and US Rep. Tom O'Halleran were present.
Arizona	Kingman	nearly 60		Trinity Episcopal Church - Locomotive Park
Arizona	Nogales	200		1904 Courthouse / DeConcini Port of Entry
Arizona	Payson	75		509 S. Beeline Highway (Hwy 87)
Arizona	Phoenix	800		Arizona State Capitol; US Rep. Ruben Gallego spoke at the rally. 30 minutes after the large rally ended, 25 members of Patriot Movement AZ staged a small counter-protest.
Arizona	Pinetop	40		White Mountain Boulevard on the sidewalk in front of the U.S. Postal Service building
Arizona	Prescott	several hundred		Prescott College - Courthouse Square
Arizona	San Luis	~50		Cesar Chavez Cultural Center at Joe Orduño Park. State Rep. Charlene Fernandez spoke at the rally.
Arizona	Tucson	1,000+		Armory Park -Tucson District Court (405 W Congress St)
Arkansas	Fayetteville	almost 1,000		Fayetteville Town Center
Arkansas	Fort Smith	90		74th Street (sidewalk in front of the post office)
Arkansas	Hot Springs	180		Bathhouse Row, Hot Springs National Park
Arkansas	Jonesboro	75+		Craighead County Courthouse. US congressional candidate Chintan Desai spoke at the rally.
Arkansas	Little Rock	400 - 500		King Elementary School - Arkansas State Capitol (stopping at overpasses)
California	Alameda	300+		Intersection of Park Street & Santa Clara Avenue
California	Angels Camp	100+		Utica Park
California	Avalon	34		Casino Building, Dive Park - Wrigley Stage, Crescent Ave
California	Bakersfield	1,000 - 1,500		ICE Office, 800 Truxtun Ave - Kern County Liberty Bell
California	Barstow			Union Bank Fountain
California	Berkeley	1,500		MLK Jr. Civic Center Park, near Old City Hall
California	Bishop	100		Bishop City Park
California	Burbank	1,000		Burbank City Hall
California	Calexico	~50		Imperial Regional Detention Facility
California	Camarillo	2,000+		sidewalks outside ICE office at 770 Paseo Camarillo
California	Carlsbad	nearly 1,000		Cannon Park
California	Carpinteria	50+		Peace Corner, located at Carpinteria and Linden Avenues; event hosted by Indivisivle Carpinteria.
California	Chico	400		Downtown City Plaza
California	Claremont	hundreds		Clarmeont Memorial Park
California	Concord	hundreds		Todos Santos Plaza
California	Dublin	400		Dublin City Hall Amphitheater
California	El Cajon	100+		Main Street - City Hall
California	Encinitas			event planned at Swami's Beach, 1298 South Coast Highway 101
California	Escondido	270		North County Mall
California	Eureka	3,000		march down Third Street
California	Fort Bragg	200 - 300		Fort Bragg Town Hall - Bainbridge Park
California	Fremont	~300		Veterans Park at Fremont Superior Court House. American sociologist & civil rights activist Harry Edwards spoke.
California	Fresno	1,000		Blackstone & Nees
California	Grass Valley	500		The rally took place at the intersection of Brunswick Road and Sutton Way in the Glenbrook Basin; a contingent of counterprotesters eventually appeared opposite the rally, with signs reading "Build the Wall" and "Deport Families Together."
California	Greenfield			
California	Half Moon Bay	300		Mac Dutra Plaza
California	Healdsburg	200		Healdsburg Avenue and Matheson Street
California	Hollister			event planned at 4th and San Benito Streets
California	Idyllwild	175		Idyllwild Town Monument - Strawberry Creek Square
California	Irvine	3,000 - 4,000		Portola High School - James A. Musick Facility
California	King City	50+		corner of Broadway St & San Antonio Dr. at King City's welcome sign
California	Laguna Beach	500		Main Beach
California	Lakeport	50		Soper Reese Theatre - march on Main St
California	Lancaster			event planned at Lancaster Library
California	Livermore	350		Flag Pole in Downtown Livermore
California	Long Beach	1,300		Cesar Chavez Park - Glenn Anderson Federal Building
California	Los Angeles	75,000		Los Angeles City Hall. In addition to celebrities, elected officials of California who spoke at the rally included Rep. Maxine Waters, Sen. Kamala Harris, Mayor Eric Garcetti and Lt. Gov. Gavin Newsom
California	Malibu	250		Pacific Coast Hwy. & Webb Way
California	Merced	100+		Courthouse Park
California	Modesto	800		Five Points at McHenry Ave, down J Street to Tenth Street Place
California	Monterey	750		Window on the Bay / Monterey Waterfront Park
California	Moreno Valley			Cardenas Market at JFK Plaza
California	Morgan Hill	200+		Morgan Hill Community and Cultural Center - ICE office
California	Mountain View	3,000		Gateway Park on corner of El Camino & Castro
California	Napa	several hundred		(Sunday, June 24) Veterans Memorial Park; event organized by Women's March Napa Valley
California	National City			Kimball Park
California	Oakland	800 - 1,000		Lakeside Park, near play structure near Staten & Bellevue / Lake Merritt
California	Ojai			sidewalk between Libbey Park and Hwy 150
California	Oxnard	hundreds		Collection Riverpark Shopping Center
California	Palm Springs	1,000		Hundreds turned out at Francis Stevens Park. U.S. congressman Dr. Raul Ruiz (D-Palm Desert) spoke at the rally.
California	Palo Alto	400+		El Camino Real and Embarcadero Road
California	Pasadena	300		Pasadena City College
California	Petaluma	500		Petaluma Mail Depot, parking lot (4th & C streets)
California	Piedmont			event planned in Montclair Park
California	Pittsburg	22		John Buckley Square
California	Pleasanton	600		Lion Wayside Park
California	Point Arena	9		in front of Point Arena post office
California	Ramona	54		10th and Main streets
California	Redding	350		Redding City Hall; march down Cypress Ave
California	Redondo Beach	350		Hawthorne Blvd & Artesia Blvd, SW Corner
California	Redwood City	3,000		Redwood City Courthouse Square
California	Richmond	1,000		ICE/West County Detention Center
California	Riverside	1,200		The Galleria at Tyler
California	Sacramento	4,000		U.S. Citizenship and Immigration Services Field Office
California	San Bernardino	450		Outside the office of Homeland Security
California	San Diego	2,500 - 4,000		Waterfront Park
California	San Francisco	30,000+		Dolores Park - San Francisco City Hall. Drivers stepped out of their cars on Octavia Street to watch (and cheer) more than 1,000 protesters pass by on Market Street
California	San Jose	1,000		San Jose City Hall
California	San Leandro	hundreds		San Leandro City Hall / Root Park
California	San Luis Obispo	1,500+		SLO County Superior Courthouse
California	San Mateo	42		300 So. El Camino Real
California	San Rafael	hundreds		(Wednesday, June 20) lawn in front of the U.S. Post Office near the Marin County Civic Center
California	Santa Barbara	2,000		De La Guerra Plaza
California	Santa Clarita	hundreds		corner of McBean Pkwy & Valencia Blvd - City Hall. Event organized by Swing Left; US congressional candidate Katie Hill was present.
California	Santa Cruz	8,000		Santa Cruz City Hall
California	Santa Maria	450		ICE facility, West Century St
California	Santa Rosa	3,000		Old Courthouse Square
California	Sebastopol	70 - 80		Sebastopol Plaza, Weeks Way
California	Solvang	150		Solvang Park
California	Sonoma	hundreds		Sonoma Plaza, 453 1st St E
California	Stockton	several hundred		Martin Luther King Jr. Plaza
California	Temecula	300+		Temecula Duck Pond
California	Tracy	few dozen		Tracy Branch Library - City Hall
California	Truckee	300		in front of Old Jail
California	Ukiah	54		Pear Tree Shopping Center - Ukiah courthouse steps. US Rep Jared Huffman spoke at the event.
California	Vacaville	285		Vacaville Town Square
California	Valencia			Westfield Valencia Town Center
California	Vallejo	200		Unity Plaza
California	Ventura	750		Ventura County Government Center
California	Victorville	40+		U.S. Federal Penitentiary detention center
California	Visalia	200+		intersection of West Walnut Ave. and South Mooney Blvd.
California	Watsonville	49		event planned at Watsonville City Plaza
California	West Hollywood	200		West Hollywood Park
California	Westlake Village	40+		Promenade at Westlake
California	Yucca Valley			northeast corner Hwy 62 and Hwy 247 (29 Palms Hwy at Old Woman Springs Rd)
Colorado	Alamosa			event planned at Cole Park
Colorado	Boulder	950		Frasier retirement community (250 people) / Unitarian Universalist Church (700 people)
Colorado	Colorado Springs	400		Colorado Springs City Hall
Colorado	Denver	4,000		Civic Center Park
Colorado	Durango	350		Buckley Park
Colorado	Edwards			event planned at Edwards Rest Stop, Exit 163 between I-70 and Hwy 6
Colorado	Fort Collins	hundreds		(Tuesday, June 26) Old Town Square
Colorado	Glenwood Springs	hundreds		Sayre Park - Centennial Park
Colorado	Grand Junction	200		Mesa County Old Courthouse
Colorado	Longmont	100		corner of Main Street and 6th Ave
Colorado	Montrose	35		Demoret Park (corner of Main Street and Townsend Ave) was the site of two rallies in June 2018. The first one, known as the "Every Corner Rally," happened on Friday, June 22, with 35 people; the second took place on June 30.
Colorado	Paonia			event planned at Poulous Park
Colorado	Pueblo	~250		Pueblo County Courthouse (the old courthouse)
Colorado	Salida			Centennial Park - Hwy 50 at Holman
Colorado	Steamboat Springs			event planned at Routt County Courthouse sidewalk
Colorado	Telluride			Wilkinson Public Library Terrace Patio
Colorado	Yuma	17		Rural Communities Resource Center - Yuma City Park Picnic Pavilion
Connecticut	Deep River	200		Deep River Town Hall
Connecticut	East Haddam	75 - 100		Two Wrasslin' Cats
Connecticut	Fairfield	500		Sherman Green Gazebo
Connecticut	Greenwich	400		Greenwich Town Hall
Connecticut	Hartford	400		(Monday, July 2) a rally of 400 people protested at the local ICE office; 35 were arrested for blocking the entrance.
Connecticut	Litchfield	hundreds		Litchfield Town Green
Connecticut	Middletown	250		Union Green. US Rep. Rosa DeLauro spoke to the crowd.
Connecticut	New London	hundreds		Williams Park
Connecticut	Southbury	200+		corner of Main St South & Main St North
Connecticut	Stamford	hundreds		Stamford Government Center
Connecticut	Stratford	100+		Stratford Town Hall (Town Green)
Connecticut	West Hartford	200		West Hartford Center (North Main & South Main Streets & Farmington Ave).
Delaware	Dover	100		Legislative Mall
Delaware	Milltown	several hundred		St. Barnabas Episocopal Church
Delaware	Wilmington	hundreds		Cool Spring Park - Carvel State Office Building. US Rep. Lisa Blunt Rochester & Senator Tom Carper were present at the rally.
Florida	Boca Raton	250		Sanborn Square
Florida	Clermont	60+		Protesters met at Sunnyside Plaza, then stood along Highway 50 for an hour (in the rain).
Florida	Crawfordville	30		Wakulla County ICE Detention Center
Florida	Dade City	30		Historic Pasco County Courthouse
Florida	Daytona Beach	200		corner of International Speedway Blvd and Beach Street
Florida	DeLand	hundreds		DeLand City Hall
Florida	Fort Myers	500		Old Lee County Courthouse
Florida	Gainesville	500+		Gainesville City Hall - Depot Park
Florida	Gulfport	500		Gulfport Casino (corner of Beach Drive and Shore Blvd). Pouring rain didn't stop protesters in Gulfport from making their voices heard.
Florida	Hollywood	100+		Diplomat Hotel
Florida	Inverness	40		Old Citrus County Courthouse Museum
Florida	Jacksonville	200+		(Friday, June 29) Jacksonville ICE office
Florida	Jensen Beach	200+		Treasure Coast Mall Entrance; corner of U.S. 1 && Jensen Beach Blvd
Florida	Lake Worth	114		Lake Worth City Hall
Florida	Lakeland	100+		Frances Langford Promenade, at Lake Mirror
Florida	Miami	hundreds		Hundreds marched from Miami-Dade College to Freedom Tower on Biscayne Boulevard and back
Florida	Melbourne	hundreds		Eau Gallie Causeway
Florida	Naples	300 - 500		Collier County Jail
Florida	Orlando	hundreds		City Hall - Orlando ICE office
Florida	Palmetto Bay	60		Coral Reef Park
Florida	Panama City			event planned at Hathaway Bridge
Florida	Pensacola	hundreds		Pensacola City Hall
Florida	Sarasota	600 - 1,000		Five Points Park
Florida	Sebastian	150+		Riverview Park
Florida	Sebring	80+		sidewalk along Kennilworth Blvd, near Sebring High School
Florida	Spring Hill	50		Spring Hill Waterfall
Florida	St. Augustine	140		Plaza de la Constitución - Castillo De San Marcos
Florida	Tallahassee	hundreds		Florida Capitol Building
Florida	Tampa	3,000		Joe Chillura Courthouse Square
Florida	The Villages	1,000		Lake Sumter Landing Town Square
Florida	West Palm Beach	550		Southern Boulevard and South Flagler Drive - Mar-a-Lago
(Georgia (U.S. state)) Georgia	Athens	several hundred		The University of Georgia Arch
(Georgia (U.S. state)) Georgia	Atlanta	around 4,000		Atlanta City Detention Center - Richard B. Russell Federal Building, where US Rep John Lewis spoke.
(Georgia (U.S. state)) Georgia	Brunswick	71		Brunswick City Hall
(Georgia (U.S. state)) Georgia	Dalton	100		Delray Farms Fresh Market
(Georgia (U.S. state)) Georgia	Lawrenceville	76		Gwinnett Justice and Administration Center
(Georgia (U.S. state)) Georgia	Lumpkin	50		Stewart Detention Center
(Georgia (U.S. state)) Georgia	Savannah	hundreds		Johnson Square – Savannah City Hall
(Georgia (U.S. state)) Georgia	Valdosta	50+		Lowndes County Courthouse
Hawaii	Honolulu	hundreds		Hawaii State Capitol. US Senator Mazie Hirono participated in the rally.
Hawaii	Kahului	dozens		corner of Pu'unene Ave and Ka'ahumanu Ave, outside Kahului Shopping Center
Hawaii	Kailua-Kona	150+		Queen Ka'ahumanu Highway, south of Henry Street
Hawaii	Lihue	500		Lihue Airport entrance
Hawaii	Waimea	56		Church Row Park / intersections of Hawaii Belt Rd & Lindsey Rd
Idaho	Boise	5,000		Idaho State Capitol
Idaho	Coeur d'Alene	347		Picnic Shelter in Riverstone Park
Idaho	Idaho Falls	two dozen		Bonneville County Courthouse lawn
Idaho	Ketchum	150		Ketchum Town Square
Idaho	Lewiston	100		Brackenbury Square
Idaho	Meridian	20		corner of Main St. & Franklin
Idaho	Pocatello	300		Caldwell Park
Idaho	Sandpoint	125		Bonner County Courthouse on First Avenue; protesters gathers on both sides of the road, greeting passing motorists who honked back their support.
Idaho	Twin Falls	100+		Twin Falls Visitor Center
Illinois	Arlington Heights	700+		Village Hall - North School Park
Illinois	Aurora	125+		An evening prayer vigil, hosted by Indivisible Aurora and the Immigrant Liberation Alliance of Aurora, was held at Aurora City Hall.
Illinois	Barrington	600		In front of Barrington Village Hall (where Rep. Peter Roskam had an office).
Illinois	Carbondale	62		First Presbyterian Church
Illinois	Champaign	500		Champaign Public Library - intersection of Green and Neil Sts
Illinois	Chicago	60,000+		Daley Plaza. A Chicago Fire Department truck sprayed a fine mist onto the crowd during the march route to keep them cool
Illinois	Downers Grove	500		Veteran's Memorial Pavilion at Fishel Park
Illinois	Elgin	150		along Kimball Avenue
Illinois	Frankfort	hundreds		Breidert Green
Illinois	Glenview	150		Glenview Veteran's Memorial
Illinois	Highland Park	300		Port Clinton Square. Highland Park Mayor Nancy Rotering & Rep. Brad Schneider (D-Deerfield) spoke at the rally
Illinois	Joliet	hundreds		Chicago St. Plaza
Illinois	Macomb	100		Washington Park
Illinois	Ottawa	150+		Jordan Block
Illinois	Peoria	125		Federal Building and U.S. Courthouse
Illinois	Quincy	~85		Second String Music
Illinois	Rockford	600+		Rockford City Hall
Illinois	Springfield	hundreds		Old State Capitol
Illinois	St. Charles			event planned at Randall Road and North Avenue
Illinois	Ullin	26		Tri-County Detention Center
Indiana	Anderson	60		Dickmann Town Center Park; event hosted by One Nation Indivisible Madison County
Indiana	Angola	60+		First Congregational United Church of Christ
Indiana	Bloomington	200+		Monroe County Courthouse
Indiana	Evansville	200+		Winfield K. Denton Federal Building (public sidewalk)
Indiana	Goshen	600+		Elkhart County Courthouse lawn
Indiana	Hammond	300		U.S. District Courthouse, corner of Clinton St & Hohman Ave
Indiana	Indianapolis	1,000		US Court/Federal Building & Indiana State House
Indiana	Logansport	48		near Logansport Farmers Market
Indiana	Richmond	150		Richmond Municipal Building
Indiana	South Bend	hundreds		Marycrest Building
Indiana	Terre Haute	150+		Vigo County Courthouse
Iowa	Cedar Falls	400		More than 100 people met outside of Rep. Rod Blum's office and marched down West Fifth Street to Franklin Street and up West First Street to Main Street back to Blum's office.
Iowa	Cedar Rapids	~100		Sokol Park
Iowa	Davenport	600		Vander Veer Park
Iowa	Des Moines	750		Iowa State Capitol
Iowa	Dubuque	150+		(Friday, June 22) Washington Park - U.S. Rep. Rod Blum's Dubuque office
Iowa	Fairfield			Central Park Square
Iowa	Iowa City	600+		U of Iowa Pentacrest - College Green Park and downtown Iowa City
Iowa	Marshalltown	125		Marshall County Courthouse (Southside lawn)
Iowa	Mason City	two dozen		Central Park
Iowa	Muscatine			Muscatine Riverside Park (by the playground)
Iowa	Okoboji	75+		Highway 71 causeway area between Arnolds Park and Okoboji
Iowa	Sioux City	270		Long Lines Family Red Center
Kansas	Dodge City	100		Dodge City Medical Center Parking Lot
Kansas	Lawrence	700		South Park
Kansas	Topeka			(Monday, July 2) Kansas Interfaith Action held a vigil on immigration and separated families at the State Capitol Building
Kansas	Wichita	hundreds		Wichita City Hall
Kentucky	Bowling Green	200+		outside US Senator Rand Paul's State Street office
Kentucky	Hopkinsville			rally on Monday night, July 2, at Grace Episcopal Church
Kentucky	Lexington	up to 700		(Saturday, June 23) Hundreds gathered at Fayette County Courthouse plaza; the event was organized by Kentucky National Organization for Women. By this time, one week ahead of June 30, similar events had already taken place across the county, including one protest outside the Lexington office of Senate Majority Leader Mitch McConnell a few days earlier.
Kentucky	Louisville	hundreds		Out of hundreds that protested at the rally, roughly 200 splintered off and marched a half-mile from Metro Hall to the ICE offices on 7th Street, and criticized Democratic Mayor Greg Fischer for not declaring Louisville a sanctuary city.
Kentucky	Madisonville	50		First United Bank Plaza on Center Street. US congressional candidate Paul Walker spoke at the rally.
Kentucky	Morehead	dozens		Fountain Park (across from Wendy's on Main St.)
Kentucky	Pikeville	10		vigil planned at the bottom of the 99 Steps of University of Pikeville; hosted by Progress Pike & Kentuckians for the Commonwealth
Louisiana	Baton Rouge	175		Baton Rouge border patrol
Louisiana	Covington	200		St. Tammany Parish courthouse
Louisiana	Lafayette	hundreds		Parc Putnam - Federal Court
Louisiana	Lake Charles	75 - 100		Lock Park
Louisiana	New Orleans	1,000+		Despite withering 100+ degree heat, hundreds gathered at Congo Square in Armstrong Park and marched through the French Quarter to Jackson Square.
Louisiana	Shreveport	120		Caddo Parish Courthouse
Maine	Augusta	1,000		State Street between Capitol Park and Maine State House
Maine	Bangor	several hundred		Cascade Park
Maine	Bar Harbor	500		Bar Harbor Village Green
Maine	Bath			in front of the Customs House, on Front Street
Maine	Brunswick	250		Brunswick Town Mall. Independent U.S. Senator and Brunswick native Angus King joined the demonstration.
Maine	Damariscotta	350		The Midcoast Unitarian Universalist Fellowship held an event at the bridge at Damariscotta and Newcastle
Maine	Farmington	200		Farmington Post Office, Main Street
Maine	Gouldsboro	75		outside Gouldsboro Town Office, Prospect Harbor Village
Maine	Lewiston–Auburn	hundreds		Longley Bridge (Auburn side)
Maine	Machias			Lee/Pellon Center parking lot, across from Helen's Restaurant
Maine	Portland	2,000		Portland City Hall. The rally grew so large that police had to shut down part of Congress Street
Maine	Presque Isle	12		A dozen people gathered outside Hardscrabble Solutions on Main Street
Maine	Vinalhaven	150+		Town Wharf
Maryland	Baltimore	1,500		Patterson Park
Maryland	Cumberland	several dozen		Downtown Cumberland Mall
Maryland	Frederick	250		Vista Shopping Center
Maryland	Poolesville	23		candlelight vigil at Whalen Park
Maryland	Snow Hill	two dozen		(Sunday, July 1) Protesters marched to the Worcester County Detention Center for an "End Immigrant Detention" rally. Five counter-protesters stood across the street.
Maryland	University Park	52		University Park Town Field
Maryland	Westminster	170		Main St at Locust Lane
Massachusetts	Andover	250		intersection of Rte. 133 and Rte. 28 (Shawsheen Square)
Massachusetts	Barnstable			County Courthouse and Unitarian Universalist Church (Main St/Rte 6A)
Massachusetts	Belchertown	250		Belchertown Common
Massachusetts	Boston	5,000 - 15,000		City Hall Plaza - Boston Common. Speakers included US Rep. Joe Kennedy III and US Senators Elizabeth Warren and Ed Markey. Police Commissioner William B. Evans estimated about 5,000 demonstrators participated, even though organizers said the crowd exceeded 15,000
Massachusetts	Brewster	200		First Parish Unitarian Universalist Church
Massachusetts	Bridgewater	25		Bridgewater Town Common; event organized by The Bridgewater Citizens of Civility and Respect (BCCR)
Massachusetts	Chatham	75		sidewalk in front of Town Hall
Massachusetts	Dennis	165		Town Hall / Rte 134 & Bob Crowell Rd
Massachusetts	Eastham	15+		Windmill Green
Massachusetts	Easthampton	100		Nashawannuck Pond / Millside Park
Massachusetts	Falmouth	hundreds		Falmouth Village Green - Peg Noonan Park. organized by Cape Cod DSA (Democratic Socialists of America)
Massachusetts	Framingham	200 - 300		Framingham Memorial Building
Massachusetts	Granville	32		Granville Town Green
Massachusetts	Great Barrington	500		corner of Main Street and State Road in front of the "GB" shrubbery
Massachusetts	Greenfield	500		Greenfield Town Common
Massachusetts	Harwich	~50		western sidewalk of Rte 137, across from Rte. 6 Exit 11
Massachusetts	Haverhill	~44		White's Corner, in front of Market Basket Plaza
Massachusetts	Hyannis	50+		intersection Rt 132/Rt 28 in Hyannis at Airport Rotary
Massachusetts	Lunenburg	250-300		outside Lunenburg Town Hall
Massachusetts	Mansfield	130+		North Common
Massachusetts	Martha's Vineyard	300+		Five Corners, Vineyard Haven
Massachusetts	Mashpee	20		Mashpee Rotary
Massachusetts	Milford	dozen+		Milford Town Hall
Massachusetts	Nantucket			event planned at Children's Beach, 65 Harbor View Way
Massachusetts	Natick	300+		Natick Common
Massachusetts	New Bedford	400+		Bethel AME Church
Massachusetts	Newburyport	200		Market Square
Massachusetts	Newton	~100		(Monday, July 2) At an outside prayer vigil, Newton Mayor Ruthanne Fuller addressed those gathered at Newton City Hall.
Massachusetts	North Dartmouth	150		Bristol County House of Corrections
Massachusetts	Northborough	150		Ellsworth-McAfee Park
Massachusetts	Orleans	dozens		Orleans/Eastham MA rotary
Massachusetts	Peabody			event planned at Temple Tiferet Shalom
Massachusetts	Pittsfield	hundreds		Park Square
Massachusetts	Provincetown	300		Provincetown Town Hall
Massachusetts	Sandwich			The Sandwich Democratic Town Committee had a booth at SandwichFest, with volunteers distributing literature on Families Belong Together.
Massachusetts	South Hadley			vigil planned outside Center Church
Massachusetts	Springfield	1,000		Court Square
Massachusetts	Truro	100		Rte 6 & Shore Rd / Truro town green
Massachusetts	Wellfleet	450		Town Hall Lawn
Massachusetts	Westborough			Westborough Rotary
Massachusetts	Williamstown	36		event planned at Field Park on Main Street
Massachusetts	Worcester	hundreds		Worcester City Hall & Common
Michigan	Adrian	150		Old Lenawee County Courthouse
Michigan	Ann Arbor	2,000		University of Michigan Diag
Michigan	Battle Creek	330+		Two FBG rallies happened outside the Calhoun County Justice Center within the latter part of June. The first one, on June 20, attracted over 200 people; the second one, on June 30, had over 130.
Michigan	Big Rapids	dozens		Big Rapids Community Library - intersection of Perry Avenue and South State Street
Michigan	Detroit	1,400 - 1,750		200-250 people gathered at Spirit of Detroit Plaza, where rally speakers included US Rep. Sander Levin (D-Royal Oak) and Democratic congressional candidate Fayrouz Saad; afterwards, people marched around the Coleman A. Young Municipal Center and arrived at Philip A. Hart Plaza. Meanwhile, between 1,200 and 1,500 more people gathered at Clark Park.
Michigan	Flint	200+		The Downtown Flat Lot (intersection of Saginaw and First Street)
Michigan	Fort Gratiot	150		Birchwood Mall
Michigan	Grand Rapids	600		Rosa Parks Circle
Michigan	Hart	30		Hart Commons
Michigan	Holland	1,000		Centennial Park
Michigan	Houghton	90		Portage Lake Lift Bridge
Michigan	Iron Mountain	75		Iron Mountain City Hall
Michigan	Jackson	160		Rep. Tim Walberg's Office. The rally was met by 15 counter-protesters supporting Trump
Michigan	Kalamazoo	hundreds		Bronson Park
Michigan	Lansing	1,000		Lansing Capital Building
Michigan	Ludington	150		Rotary Park
Michigan	Manistee	100		corner of U.S. 31 & River St
Michigan	Marquette	75		Marquette Post Office
Michigan	Muskegon	several hundred		Hackley Park
Michigan	Petoskey	200		Peoples Park: "Hole in the Ground" (corner of Mitchell Street and U.S. 31)
Michigan	Pontiac	250		Pontiac Public Library
Michigan	Port Huron	100+		Two Saturday rallies took place outside the ICE detention facility (St. Clair County Jail) on June 23 & 30; the second one had over 100 people.
Michigan	Saginaw	dozen+		(Monday, July 2) New Covenant Christian Center Church
Michigan	Sault Ste. Marie	45+		the eagle statue near Superior Coffee
Michigan	St. Joseph	200		on the bluff in downtown St. Joseph
Michigan	Traverse City	350		Traverse City Courthouse
Michigan	Troy	75		Gateway Park
Minnesota	Albert Lea	100		Freeborn County Detention Center
Minnesota	Brainerd	100		along Washington Street near Brainerd Historic Water Tower
Minnesota	Detroit Lakes	100		Veteran's Memorial Park
Minnesota	Duluth	400		MN Power Plaza / corner of Lake Ave & Superior St
Minnesota	Grand Marais	100 - 125		Harbor Park
Minnesota	Grand Rapids	150		Central School, downtown Grand Rapids; event organized by Itasca County INDIVISIBLE of Minnesota
Minnesota	Lanesboro	100+		baseball field at Sylvan Park & Riverview Campgrounds
Minnesota	Mankato	400		Riverfront Park Outdoor Shelter
Minnesota	Minneapolis	7,000 - 30,000		Minneapolis Convention Center
Minnesota	Rochester	hundreds		Peace Plaza
Mississippi	Bay St. Louis / Pass Christian	dozens		Bay Bridge
Mississippi	Jackson	300+		Governor's Mansion
Mississippi	Tupelo	dozens		Fairpark
Missouri	Cape Girardeau	~40		Freedom Corner at Capaha Park
Missouri	Columbia	400		Boone County Courthouse
Missouri	Kansas City	2,000		Penn Valley Park
Missouri	St. Joseph	120+		Francis Street First United Methodist Church
Missouri	St. Louis	1,000		Kiener Plaza East
Missouri	Springfield	hundreds		U.S. Senator Roy Blunt's office
Missouri	Troy	few dozen		ICE Detention Center, Lincoln County Sheriff's Department. Highway 61 was briefly closed to make way for the rally.
Montana	Billings	450		Yellowstone County Courthouse
Montana	Bozeman	hundreds		Bozeman Public Library
Montana	Great Falls			Civic Center Steps
Montana	Helena	1,000*		Women's Park (*an earlier report estimated 350-400 people)
Montana	Kalispell	100		Two rallies were scheduled at the sidewalk of Depot Park, on June 20 & 30; the first one had 100 protesters.
Montana	Libby			
Montana	Livingston	dozen		sidewalk at Depot Park
Montana	Missoula	700+		Two immigration rallies occurred in Missoula: on June 20, more than 400 people gathered outside Missoula County jail; on June 30, a few hundred people marched from Caras Park to Missoula County Courthouse, where marchers signed a petition urging GOP Sen. Steve Daines to push the Senate Committee on Homeland Security and Governmental Affairs to demand immediate family reunification.
Nebraska	Alliance	24		Box Butte County Courthouse
Nebraska	Chadron	75		Downtown Plaza
Nebraska	Lincoln	1,500		Nebraska State Capitol
Nebraska	McCook	10		Norris Park
Nebraska	Omaha	500		Plaza de la Raza
Nebraska	Scottsbluff	40		Sen. Deb Fischer's office
Nevada	Boulder City	25		Veterans' Memorial Park - City Hall
Nevada	Carson City	80		Nevada State Capitol
Nevada	Las Vegas	500 - 600		U.S. Federal Courthouse
Nevada	Reno	1,200		Reno City Plaza - Bruce R. Thompson Courthouse & Federal Building
New Hampshire	Concord	700		NH State House
New Hampshire	Conway			Main Street
New Hampshire	Hanover	700		Dartmouth College Green
New Hampshire	Keene	20+		Central Square
New Hampshire	Littleton	46		Littleton Post Office (outside)
New Hampshire	Manchester	500		Manchester City Hall
New Hampshire	Nashua	300		Greeley Park, bandshell side
New Hampshire	Peterborough	50+		Peterborough Town Hall
New Hampshire	Portsmouth	hundreds		Market Square in front of the North Church
New Hampshire	Wilton	50		Wilton Public Library
New Jersey	Asbury Park	300		Springwood Avenue Park
New Jersey	Bedminster	200 - 400		While Donald Trump spent the weekend at his New Jersey golf club, several hundred people gathered along Route 206 just a few miles away
New Jersey	Bridgeton	dozens		Cumberland County Courthouse
New Jersey	Cape May	several dozen		Washington Mall
New Jersey	Clifton	several hundred		Clifton City Hall
New Jersey	Edison	~40		Oak Tree Pond Park
New Jersey	Englewood	100		Depot Square Park
New Jersey	Flemington	hundreds		Old Courthouse on Main St
New Jersey	Glen Ridge	600+		Glen Ridge Congregational Church & St. Francis of Assisi Church
New Jersey	Glen Rock	500+		steps of Glen Rock Borough Hall, Harding Plaza
New Jersey	Jersey City	100+		(Tuesday evening, July 3) Newark Avenue Pedestrian Plaza
New Jersey	Lambertville	200+		North Union Street Park
New Jersey	Leonia	50		Leonia Middle School
New Jersey	New Brunswick	500+		New Brunswick City Hall
New Jersey	Newark	500		Newark City Hall. US Sens. Cory Booker and Bob Menendez, as well as first lady Tammy Murphy, spoke at the event.
New Jersey	Princeton	several hundred		Hinds Plaza
New Jersey	Red Bank	hundreds		Marine Park - Riverside Garden Park
New Jersey	Rutherford	50		Two rallies happened at Rutherford Congregational Church, on June 14 (50 people gathered, then marched to the Rutherford train station) and June 30
New Jersey	Toms River	200		Ocean County Library
New Mexico	Alamogordo	75		Alameda Park gazebo, White Sands Boulevard
New Mexico	Albuquerque	thousands		Civic Plaza
New Mexico	Carlsbad	100+		Eddy County Courthouse Lawn, Canal St
New Mexico	Columbus	50		Columbus Village Plaza - post of entry / Mexico border of Puerto Palomas, Chihuahua
New Mexico	Farmington	150+		Farmington Museum at Gateway Park. More than a dozen children led the crowd in the Pledge of Allegiance.
New Mexico	Gallup	75+		Gallup Amtrak Train station, Rte 66 - Downtown Courthouse Plaza
New Mexico	Roswell	60		in front of Federal Building & ICE office, North Richardson Ave.
New Mexico	Santa Fe	hundreds		New Mexico State Capitol (The Roundhouse). 16 protesters were arrested.
New Mexico	Silver City	50 - 100		Hub Plaza - Farmers Market via Bullard St
New Mexico	Socorro	36		Socorro Historic Plaza
New Mexico	Tierra Amarilla			event planned at Historical Marker at north entrance to Tierra Amarilla
New Mexico	Truth or Consequences			Ralph Edwards Park
New York	Albany	100+		West Capitol Park
New York	Bayside	180		Long Island Rail Road trestle, west side of Bell Boulevard
New York	Beacon	50+		Polhill Park
New York	Binghamton	nearly 200		Federal Building on Henry Street
New York	Buffalo	2,500+		Niagara Square
New York	Canton	145		Canton Village Green - E.J. Noble Building
New York	Cobleskill	100		Veterans Park
New York	Cooperstown	200+		Pioneer Park on Main Street - Otsego County Courthouse
New York	Cortland	100		Cortland Post Office / Christ Community Church
New York	Dunkirk	50+		Washington Park
New York	East Quogue	few hundred		East Quogue Park
New York	East Setauket	hundreds		corner of Bennetts road & Rt. 25A
New York	Elmira	dozens		Wisner Park
New York	Geneva	hundreds		New York State Finger Lakes Welcome Center
New York	Glens Falls	60+		Rep. Elise Stefanik's office / Centennial Circle - Glen Falls City Park
New York	Greenport	hundreds		Mitchell Park
New York	Huntington Station	800 - 1,000		49 West Jericho Tpke. Intersection
New York	Ithaca	500		Bernie Milton Pavilion, Ithaca Commons
New York	Jackson Heights	2,000		Jackson Heights post office - Our Lady of Sorrows, Corona
New York	Kingston	hundreds		Kingston City Hall
New York	Malone			Arsenal Green
New York	New City	around 400		Rockland County Courthouse
New York	New Paltz	100+		in front of Elting Memorial Library on Main Street
New York	New Rochelle			event planned at New Rochelle United Methodist Church
New York	New York City	35,000+		Foley Square - Brooklyn Bridge - ICE headquarters. US Sen. Kirsten Gillibrand and NYC Mayor Bill de Blasio, both considered contenders for the 2020 presidential election, were among the first political leaders to call for ICE to be abolished. Political newcomer Alexandria Ocasio-Cortez, who had just upset incumbent Rep. Joe Crowley in the 2018 Democratic primary, spoke at a rally of 500 in Queens, demanding likewise.
New York	Oswego	dozens		corner of West Bridge & West First Streets
New York	Plattsburgh	240		Durkee Street public parking lot - City Hall Place - Trinity Park. Mayor Colin Read addressed the rally.
New York	Potsdam	100		First Presbyterian Church of Potsdam
New York	Rhinebeck	250		Episcopal Church of the Messiah
New York	Rochester	200		Washington Square Park
New York	Rockville Centre	200+		Front St. by Long Island Rail Road Station entrance
New York	Rouses Point	50+		U.S. Customs and Border Protection (Canada)
New York	Saranac Lake	210		Riverside Park
New York	Saratoga Springs	hundreds		Congress Park - Broadway
New York	Staten Island	100		Staten Island Borough Hall
New York	Syracuse	200 - 300		Perseverance Park - 205 S Salina St
New York	Warwick	250		Old School Baptist Meeting House - Stanley Deming Park
New York	Watertown			event planned at Watertown Public Square
New York	West Leyden	10		corner of Rte 26 and Osceola Rd
New York	Westbury	350		Post & Maple Avenues
New York	White Plains	800		Charles L. Brieant Jr. Federal Building and Courthouse
New York	Woodstock	200		(Sunday night vigil, July 1) McHenry County jail
North Carolina	Asheville	1,000+		Haywood St
North Carolina	Burlington	80		Burlington Municipal Building
North Carolina	Chapel Hill	hundreds		Chapel Hill Court house
North Carolina	Charlotte	hundreds		First Ward Park
North Carolina	Davidson	200+		Davidson Village Green
North Carolina	Durham			
North Carolina	Franklin	200+		the gazebo in Downtown Franklin, across from the Courthouse
North Carolina	Gastonia	27		Martin Luther King Monument, at the corner of Long Avenue and Dr. Martin Luther King Way. NC State senatorial candidate Altriese Price spoke at the rally.
North Carolina	Greensboro	300+		Governmental Plaza - LeBauer Park
North Carolina	Greenville	150		Pitt County Courthouse
North Carolina	Hendersonville	400+		Hendersonville Historic Courthouse; actress Kelly McGillis spoke to the crowd
North Carolina	Morganton	~30		
North Carolina	Newton	70		Old Newton Courthouse Lawn (Catawba County Museum of History)
North Carolina	Ocracoke	12		Sunglass Shop at Spencer's Market - Ocracoke Lighthouse
North Carolina	Pittsboro	several hundred		Historic Courthouse, downtown Pittsboro
North Carolina	Raleigh	1,600+		Thousands gathered at City Plaza, then marched to Bicentennial Mall
North Carolina	Salisbury	dozens		Brenner Ave - Kelsey Scott Park
North Carolina	Southport	50+		Southport Waterfront Park
North Carolina	Wilmington	150 - 400		Ennis Park at City Hall, between 3rd and 4th Streets
North Carolina	Winston-Salem	hundreds		Merschel Plaza
North Dakota	Antler			post office (town population: 27)
North Dakota	Fargo	200		lawn between Civic Center and Fargo Library
North Dakota	Grand Forks	130 - 150		parking garage behind the County Office Building - North 3rd St
Ohio	Akron	200		(Thursday, June 14) corner of Main and Mill
Ohio	Ashland	60		junction at Claremont Ave, College Ave, and King Rd.
Ohio	Athens	100		Ohio University College Green
Ohio	Bowling Green	250		BG Green Space (Wooster Green)
Ohio	Cincinnati	1,000		Washington Park
Ohio	Cleveland	3,000		Public Square
Ohio	Columbus	2,000		Ohio Statehouse
Ohio	Dayton	1,200		Courthouse Square-Montgomery Co
Ohio	Lima	50		(Thursday, June 14) gazebo at Lima Town Square
Ohio	Norwalk	20+		St. Paul Catholic Church - Huron County Courthouse
Ohio	Oberlin	200		SE Corner of Tappan Square
Ohio	Oxford	200		Memorial Park
Ohio	Toledo	500+		Toledo's Love Wall
Ohio	Wilmington	several hundred		Clinton County Courthouse
Ohio	Wooster	250		(Sunday, June 24) Wooster's Public Square
Ohio	Youngstown	200		Central Square, Federal Plaza. One particular recent ICE raid on the minds of protesters took place in nearby Salem, where over 100 suspected illegal immigrants had been arrested.
Oklahoma	Oklahoma City	hundreds		Oklahoma State Capitol
Oklahoma	Tahlequah			event planned at corner of Choctaw and Muskogee Ave.
Oklahoma	Tulsa	300		David L Moss Criminal Justice Center; several American Indians joined hundreds of people at this rally.
Oregon	Albany	hundreds		Linn County Courthouse
Oregon	Astoria	hundreds		16th and Marine Drive, river side
Oregon	Bend	300+		NW Greenwood Ave & NW Bond St (NE Corner) - Diagonal from US Rep Greg Walden's office
Oregon	Coos Bay	hundreds		Coos Bay Boardwalk
Oregon	Corvallis	hundreds		(Thursday, June 14) Benton County Courthouse
Oregon	The Dalles	240		Federal Post Office sidewalk
Oregon	Eugene	thousands		Federal Courthouse
Oregon	Grants Pass	300		Riverside Park - Josephine Court House
Oregon	Hillsboro	300+		Hillsboro Civic Center
Oregon	Madras	20		corner of Hwy 97 and Hwy 26 across from Sonic
Oregon	McMinnville	200+		(Saturday, June 14) McMinnville parking lot, upper level (NE Davis St) - McMinnville Public Library
Oregon	Medford	hundreds		Vogel Plaza
Oregon	Portland	5,000		North Park Blocks. US Sen Ron Wyden spoke at the rally. The crowd of thousands was mostly peaceful; meanwhile, two opposing protest groups, Patriot Prayer and Antifa (each numbering more than 100 members), clashed in downtown Portland, leading police to revoke Patriot Prayer's permit for rallying.
Oregon	Redmond	150		Centennial Park
Oregon	Roseburg	250		Northwest Garden Valley Blvd
Oregon	Salem	500		Oregon State Capitol State Rep. Teresa Alonso Leon spoke to the crowd.
Oregon	Sherwood	150		J. Clyde Hopkins Elementary School
Pennsylvania	Beaver	100+		Beaver County Courthouse
Pennsylvania	Bethlehem	~300		Bethlehem City Hall / Bethlehem Area Public Library
Pennsylvania	Bridgeport	27		Sts. Peter and Paul Ukrainian Catholic Church
Pennsylvania	Doylestown	hundreds		Old Bucks County Courthouse
Pennsylvania	Harrisburg	325+		Susquehanna River. The rally was initially to be held on the Capitol steps, but was moved after organizers learned of a counter-protest at the same location (which drew fewer than a dozen people).
Pennsylvania	Horsham	hundreds		Carl Kohler Park
Pennsylvania	Indiana	160+		IRMC Park - courthouse
Pennsylvania	Johnstown			event planned outside congressman Keith Rothfus' office
Pennsylvania	Kennett Square			event planned in front of Kendal at Longwood Retirement Community
Pennsylvania	Lancaster	~200		Lancaster County Courthouse
Pennsylvania	Milford			event planned at Harford & Broad Street
Pennsylvania	Norristown	300+		Montgomery County Courthouse
Pennsylvania	Philadelphia	3,000		Logan Square
Pennsylvania	Pittsburgh	2,000		Mellon Square
Pennsylvania	Scranton	200+		Lackawanna County Courthouse Square
Pennsylvania	Sharon	100+		outside of Rep. Mike Kelly's office
Pennsylvania	State College	700		Allen Street Gates
Pennsylvania	Swarthmore	hundreds		Swarthmore Town Center
Pennsylvania	West Chester	600		A large crowd stood outside the Chester County Courthouse; Mayor Dianne Herrin spoke at the rally. Three counter-protesters with signs stood across the street.
Pennsylvania	Wilkes-Barre	50 - 100		Public Square
Pennsylvania	York	100+		Continental Square
Rhode Island	Cranston	400		US Customs and Border Protection building
Rhode Island	Providence	200 - 300		Rhode Island State House
South Carolina	Bluffton	200		Bluffton Village Town Center
South Carolina	Charleston	400		U.S. Custom House
South Carolina	Columbia	hundreds		South Carolina State House
South Carolina	Darlington			event planned in Darlington City Square (Courthouse)
South Carolina	Greenville	~250		Graham Plaza
South Carolina	Myrtle Beach	200+		Market Common / Valor Memorial Park
South Carolina	Rock Hill	almost 100		Senator Lindsey Graham's Rock Hill Office
South Dakota	Aberdeen	70		Anderson Park
South Dakota	Rapid City	200+		corner of Omaha & 5th Streets at Memorial Park
South Dakota	Sioux Falls	hundreds		Fawick Park
South Dakota	Vermillion			
Tennessee	Chattanooga	175+		On Friday, June 22, over 100 people met at Chattanooga Public Library to make signs, then marched to Miller Plaza for a vigil; later in the evening, a group of protesters held neon blue letters spelling out "ABOLISH ICE." On June 30, another rally was held at Renaissance Park/Coolidge Park.
Tennessee	Cookeville			Cookeville Town Square
Tennessee	Greeneville	95		Greene County Courthouse
Tennessee	Jackson	100		Madison County Courthouse. U.S. congressional candidate John Boatner Jr. spoke at the rally.
Tennessee	Johnson City	300		Founders Park
Tennessee	Knoxville	250		City County Building. Earlier in the week, a similar rally drew more than 500 protesters to the same location
Tennessee	Memphis	500		Gaisman Park
Tennessee	Murfreesboro	50+		Rep. Scott DesJarlais' office
Tennessee	Nashville	1,000+		Fannie Mae Dees Park - Belmont University
Tennessee	Smyrna			Downtown Smyrna
Texas	Abilene	200+		Everman Park
Texas	Alpine	150		Brewster County Courthouse lawn
Texas	Amarillo	several dozen		Sanborn Park
Texas	Austin	8,000		Texas State Capitol
Texas	Brenham	100		Washington County Courthouse
Texas	Brownsville	1,000+		Brownsville Federal Courthouse
Texas	Bryan	250+		corner of Briarcrest Dr & Texas 6 just outside US Rep. Bill Flores' Office
Texas	Corpus Christi	100+		Cole Park
Texas	Dallas	2,500		Dallas City Hall. 80 protesters rallied outside the ICE building off Stemmons Freeway; 5 were arrested for blocking the highway service road.
Texas	Deer Park	dozens		Deer Park Municipal Court Building - Rep Brian Babin's office
Texas	Denton	hundreds		Denton County Courthouse on The Square; the event featured eight speakers including educators, faith leaders and representatives from the Democratic Party. The Stonewall Democrats, Indivisible Denton, voter registration groups and the Opening Doors International Services tabled at the event.
Texas	El Paso	1,500		Edgemere Park - ICE's El Paso Processing Center. Protesters shut down part of the international bridge for about an hour, reducing all traffic to one lane at the exit while smaller group from both countries blocked half the bridge at the border, their message heard in two countries.
Texas	Fort Worth	hundreds		Tarrant County Court House / The Federal Building
Texas	Galveston	50		(Saturday, June 14) 4700 Seawall Blvd.
Texas	Granbury	70		Hood County Courthouse
Texas	Houston	several thousand		With self-made posters in hand, thousands marched a few blocks from Houston City Hall to Senator Ted Cruz's office.
Texas	Kerrville	200		Kerrville City Hall sidewalk
Texas	Longview	hundreds		Heritage Plaza
Texas	Lubbock	100+		Tim Cole Statue Memorial Park
Texas	Lufkin	dozens		Angelina County Courthouse
Texas	McAllen	several dozen		U.S. Border Patrol McAllen Station
Texas	McKinney	400		Mitchell Park, near the Square
Texas	Midland	100		Midkiff Drive, near the Midland Park Mall
Texas	Nacogdoches	100		Banita Creek Park - Nacogdoches County Courthouse
Texas	Paris	150		Culbertson Fountain in downtown Paris
Texas	San Antonio	several hundred		San Fernando Cathedral / Main Plaza. Earlier in the day, a smaller group of about 50 people held a rally on the other side of the issue ("America First" event) in Travis Park.
Texas	Sherman	40+		Grayson County Courthouse Lawn
Texas	Tornillo	hundreds		Marcelino Serna Port of Entry. Former HUD Secretary Julian Castro, civil rights leader Dolores Huerta & actors Rob Reiner & Mira Sorvino addressed the crowd
Texas	Waco	200+		Heritage Square
Texas	Wichita Falls	50		A candlelight vigil was held at Lucy Park Pavilion.
Utah	Kanab	dozen+		Jacob Hamblin Park
Utah	Logan	200		Cache County Courthouse
Utah	Moab	150		Moab Information Center
Utah	Provo	100		Provo Historic Courthouse
Utah	Salt Lake City	2,500 - 4,000		Utah State Capitol. US Senator Jeff Merkley (D-OR) spoke at the rally.
Utah	St. George	100+		Town Square Park
Vermont	Barre	100		Studio Place Arts (SPA) - Depot Square
Vermont	Bennington	100+		Four Corners (intersection of Rtes 7 & 9)
Vermont	Brattleboro	500+		Brattleboro Common
Vermont	Burlington	2,000 - 3,000		Church St - Battery Park
Vermont	Essex Junction	nearly 200		The Five Corners
Vermont	Manchester Center	200		Adams Park
Vermont	Rutland	130		Main Street Park
Vermont	Windsor	12		Old South Church (candlelight vigil)
Virginia	Alexandria	300		The Kingstowne Communion (United Methodist church) held an Alexandria Vigil for Immigrant Families at 8pm, with white candles and prayer booklets, at Kingstowne Towne Center.
Virginia	Big Stone Gap	60		Miner's Park
Virginia	Bristol	135		Bristol Sign
Virginia	Charlottesville	hundreds		Albemarle County Office Building
Virginia	Fredericksburg			event planned at corner of Rt 3 and Williams Street
Virginia	Harrisonburg	300		Court Square
Virginia	Lynchburg	100		First Christian Church, Rivermont Ave
Virginia	Newport News	40 - 50		in front of Rouse Tower
Virginia	Norfolk	hundreds		Several dozen protesters stood on the steps of the office building of US Customs and Border Patrol.
Virginia	Onancock	60		Market Street (town population under 1,300)
Virginia	Richmond	thousands		Bell Tower at Capitol Square. U.S. Senator Tim Kaine & Rep. Donald McEachin attended the rally.
Virginia	Roanoke	135		Roanoke Public Library; event hosted by Roanoke Indivisible. Activities included an indoor panel, several outside lie-in protest periods (100 mylar blankets provided) and a children's parade with Statue of Liberty crowns.
Virginia	Staunton	70+		Nearly 40 people gathered at one rally at Gypsy Hill Park, then marched to Augusta County Courthouse to merge with a second rally (more than 30 people).
Virginia	Virginia Beach	200 - 300		Mount Trashmore Park
Virginia	Williamsburg	200		Williamsburg-James City County Courthouse
Washington	Anacortes	200		People stood in the rain while occupying all corners of the intersection at 12th St. and Commercial Ave.
Washington	Bainbridge Island	200		Town Square next to Bainbridge Island City Hall
Washington	Bellingham	1,500 - 2,000		Bellingham City Hall
Washington	Bonney Lake			event planned at 18211 State Route 410 E
Washington	Bothell	~400		intersection of Bothell Way NE and Woodinville Drive
Washington	Bremerton	300+		Evergreen Rotary Park
Washington	Coupeville	270		Island County Courthouse
Washington	Eastsound	100+		Eastsound Village Green
Washington	Edmonds	almost 600		intersection of 100th Ave W and Edmonds Way
Washington	Ellensburg	300+		Rotary Pavilion, 104 East 4th Avenue
Washington	Everett	800		Snohomish County Courthouse Plaza and Amphitheater
Washington	Friday Harbor	60+		San Juan county district court lawn
Washington	Kennewick	50+		Highway 395
Washington	Langley	200+		Highway 525 near Bayview Park & Ride
Washington	Longview	150		corner of 30th and Ocean Beach Hwy
Washington	Mount Vernon	200		Skagit County courthouse. Unlike most everywhere else, this rally had rain and cloudy skies to march through.
Washington	Olympia	3,000		Capitol Campus, Legislative Steps
Washington	Port Angeles	675+		Port Angeles Border Patrol Station. This was Port Angeles' largest political rally in recent memory (400 were expected).
Washington	Pullman	300		High Sctreet Mall - Reaney Park
Washington	Richland	200		John Dam Plaza
Washington	SeaTac	10,000		SeaTac Detention Center
Washington	Spokane	1,000		Grant Park
Washington	Tacoma	400		Wright Park / People's Park
Washington	Vancouver	500+		750 Anderson - Esther Short Park, Bell Tower Community Square
Washington	Walla Walla	350		First Congregational Church
Washington	Wenatchee	several hundred		Memorial Park
Washington	Yakima	dozens		US Rep Dan Newhouse's District Office
West Virginia	Parkersburg	100		Bicentennial Park - US Rep David McKinley's office
West Virginia	Wheeling	100+		Market Plaza
Wisconsin	Appleton	200		Houdini Plaza
Wisconsin	Eau Claire	500 - 600		Eau Claire Wilson Park
Wisconsin	Green Bay	700		Green Bay CityDeck & Fox River
Wisconsin	Kenosha	90+		Navy Memorial Park / Civic Center Park. A second rally was held Monday evening, July 2
Wisconsin	La Crosse	450		City Hall - Burns Park
Wisconsin	Madison	600 - 800		Wisconsin State Capitol, State St Entrance
Wisconsin	Menomonie	nearly 300		Clocktower Plaza, UW-Stout - Wilson Park
Wisconsin	Milwaukee	thousands		517 E. Wisconsin Ave
Wisconsin	Mineral Point	14		Watertower Park - Esperanza
Wisconsin	Minocqua	175		Municipal parking lot between Minocqua Veteran's Park & post office
Wisconsin	Oshkosh	100		Main Street Sundial
Wisconsin	Sheboygan	50		Paradigm Coffee & Music shop
Wisconsin	Shorewood	100		Shorewood Village Hall Parking Lot to Atwater Park
Wisconsin	Stevens Point	180		march down Division St
Wisconsin	Sturgeon Bay	130		Sawyer Park
Wisconsin	Viroqua	75		A rally was held in front of the Viroqua Area Veterans Memorial
Wisconsin	Waukesha	40+		Waukesha County Sheriff's Office; event hosted by Voces de la Frontera
Wisconsin	Wausau	100		400 Block
Wisconsin	Wisconsin Rapids	16		Centralia Center parking lot - West Grand Avenue bridge - corner of West Jackson St and Second Ave North
Wyoming	Casper	70		Pioneer Park
Wyoming	Cheyenne	100		Cheyenne ICE office
Wyoming	Jackson	200		Town Square
Wyoming	Laramie	hundreds		Laramie held its second ever PrideFest, the central part being the Pride March, on Front Street. In addition to LGBTQ issues, the March and its speakers devoted much of their time addressing what 700+ cities across the nation were rallying against.

=== International ===
Country	Cities	Estimated participants	Photo	Locations/Notes
Austria	Vienna	25		Gartenbaupromenade 2
Canada	Calgary	dozens		U.S. Consulate
Canada	Edmonton	100+		End of Steel Park
Canada	Halifax	dozens		
Canada	Lethbridge	several dozen		
Canada	Ottawa	hundreds		Human Rights Monument - US Embassy
Canada	Toronto	few hundred		US Consolate
Canada	Vancouver	100+		US Consolate - Trump Tower in Downtown Vancouver
Canada	Winnipeg	two dozen+		US Consolate
Denmark	Copenhagen	75		Dag Hammarskjölds Allé 17
France	Paris			Place de la Republique
Germany	Hamburg	45		U.S. Consulate
Germany	Munich	100		U.S. Consulate
Italy	Rome	52		corner of Via Veneto and Via Leonida Bissolati across from the American Embassy
Japan	Tokyo	hundreds		Hachiko Square, Shibuya Station; event hosted by Democrats Abroad
Mexico	Mexico City	thousands		U.S. Embassy
Nepal	Kathmandu	25		
Netherlands	Amsterdam	500+		iAmsterdam sign across the Rijksmuseum
Spain	Barcelona	27		Plaça de Catalunya
Spain	Madrid			(June 19) US Embassy / (June 30) Puerta del Sol
Spain	Valencia	24		Plaza del Ayuntamiento
United Kingdom	London	50+		new US Embassy building, Nine Elms, South London

== Gallery ==
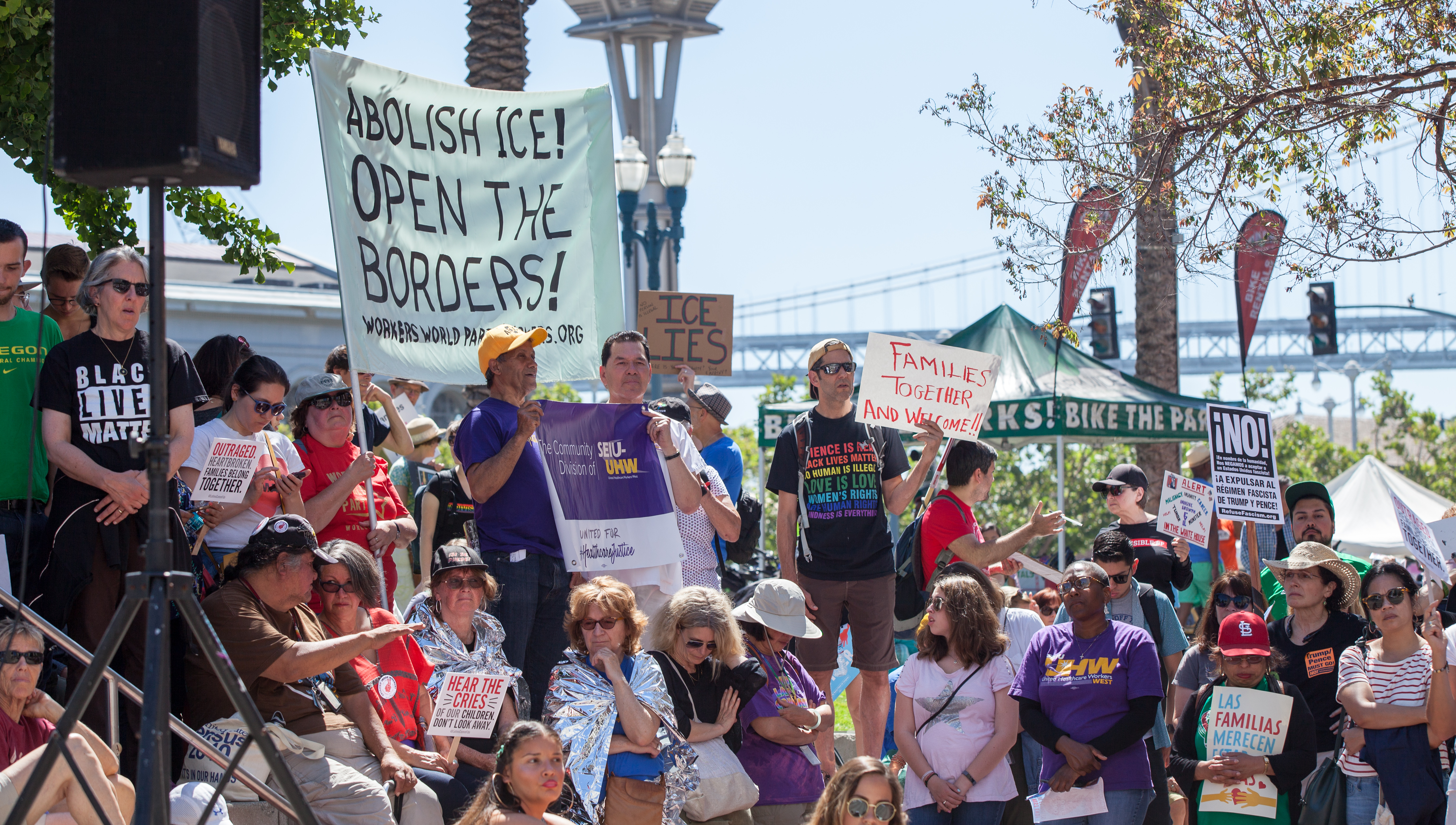
Rally in San Francisco

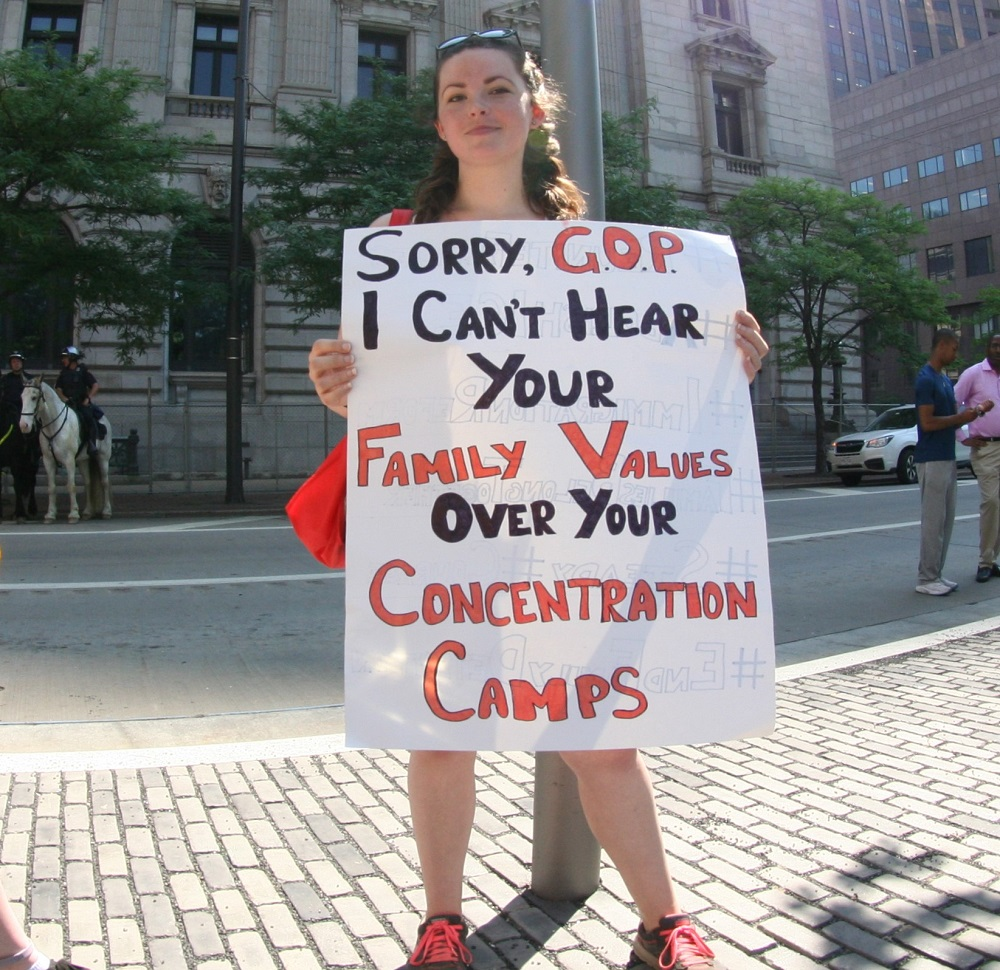
A protester compares child detention by the government to the Nazi concentration camps

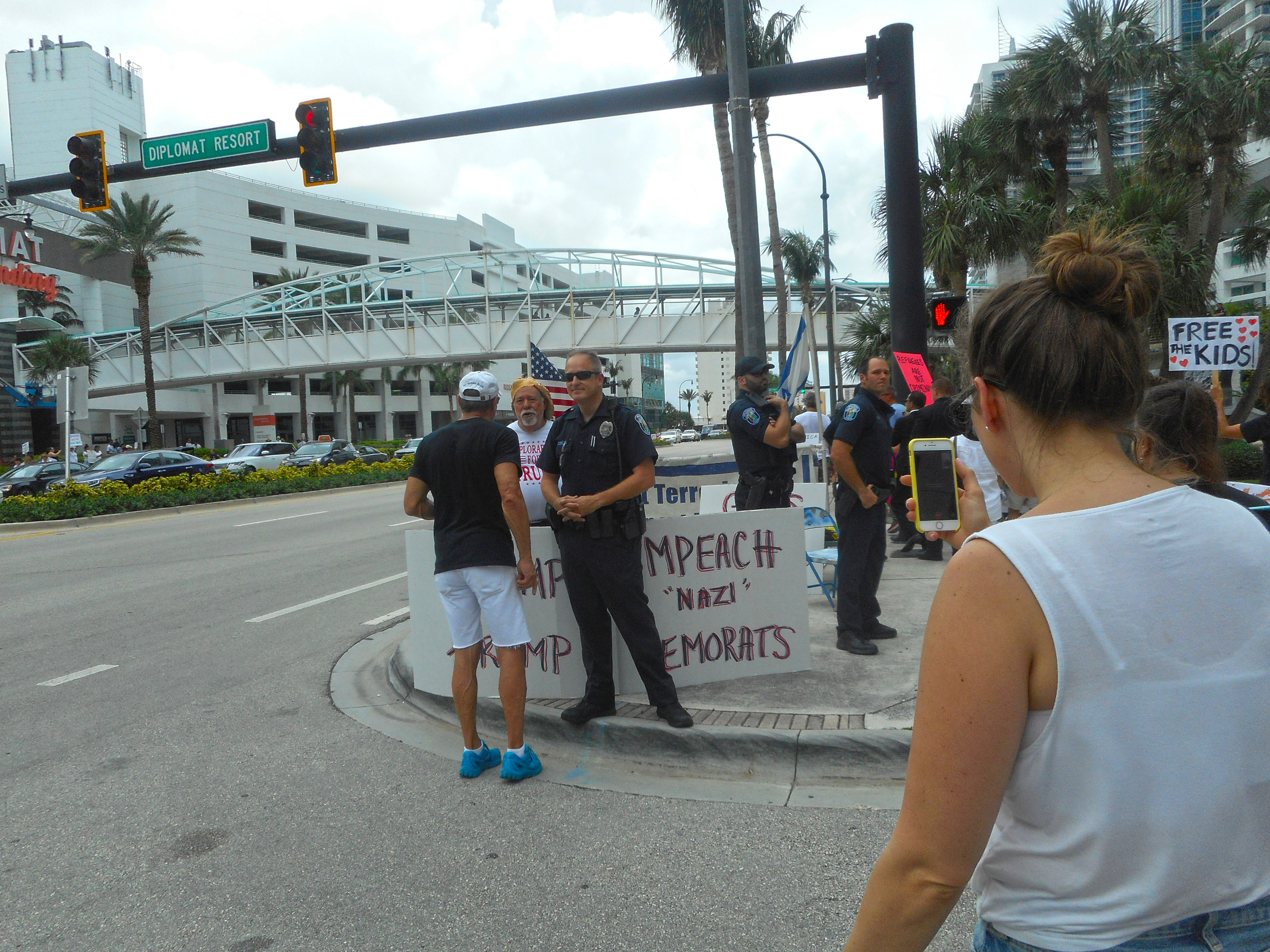
Counter-protester with "Gays for Trump" and "Impeach Nazi Democrats" signs confronted by a protester in Hollywood, Florida

== See also ==
- List of protest marches on Washington, D.C.
