= M. S. Drew =

American politician

Member of the Washington House of Representatives
- In office 1889–1891

Personal details
- Born: January 9, 1827 Machias, Maine, United States
- Died: August 8, 1908 (aged 81) Seattle, Washington, United States
- Party: Republican

Michael S. Drew (January 9, 1827 – August 8, 1908) was an American politician in the state of Washington. A Republican, he served in the Washington House of Representatives from 1889 to 1891.
