= Centre Street Congregational Church =

Historic church in Maine, United States

- U.S. National Register of Historic Places
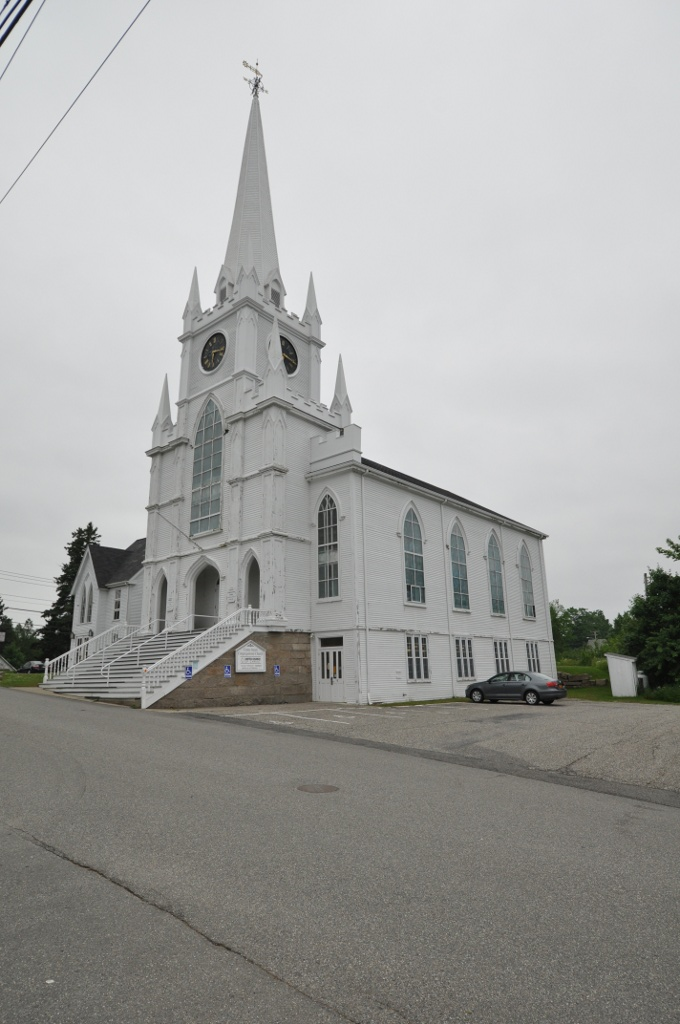

- Location within Maine Location within the United States
- Location: Center St., Machias, Maine
- Coordinates: 44.7159°N 67.45786°W
- Area: 1 acre (0.40 ha)
- Built: 1837
- Architectural style: Gothic Revival
- NRHP reference No.: 75000114
- Added to NRHP: May 12, 1975

Centre Street Congregational Church is a historic church at 9 Center Street in Machias, Maine, United States. Built in 1836–37, it is an important early example of Gothic Revival architecture in northern New England, apparently based on an early design by the noted Gothic architect Richard Upjohn. The building was listed on the National Register of Historic Places in 1975. The congregation is affiliated with the United Church of Christ; its current pastor is Rev. Susan Maxwell, M. Div.

== Description and history ==
The Centre Street Congregational Church is located on the east side of Center Street, between Court and Main Streets in downtown Machias. It is a large single-story wood-frame structure, set on a high granite foundation, with a gable roof and clapboard siding. Its west-facing main facade is dominated by a projecting square tower, which begins with three of the five bays of that facade. On the first level are three Gothic-arched openings leading into an open foyer, with Gothic-arched doors leading into the building. The next three stages of the tower have a tall Gothic window, flanked at its sides, and again at the tower corners, by pilasters separated by a cornice line at each level. The tower corners at the third stage have pinnacles, and the fourth stage is reduced in size. The fifth stage houses a clock with faces on each of four sides, and is topped by pinnacles at the corners and a steeple.

The church was designed in 1836 and completed in 1837, and is one of the state's oldest surviving examples of Gothic architecture (the oldest is the 1819 Christ Episcopal Church in Gardiner). It was designed by a Mr. Stephenson, about whom nothing is known, but the plans appear to be remarkably similar to Richard Upjohn's plans for St. John's Catholic Church in Bangor (built in 1835–39, no longer standing). The church bell was a used bell cast by the foundry of Paul Revere. The organ was built by George Stevens and installed in 1867, and the clock, built by E. Howard & Co., was installed in 1870.

== See also ==
- National Register of Historic Places listings in Washington County, Maine
