= Liberty Hall (Machiasport, Maine) =

- U.S. National Register of Historic Places
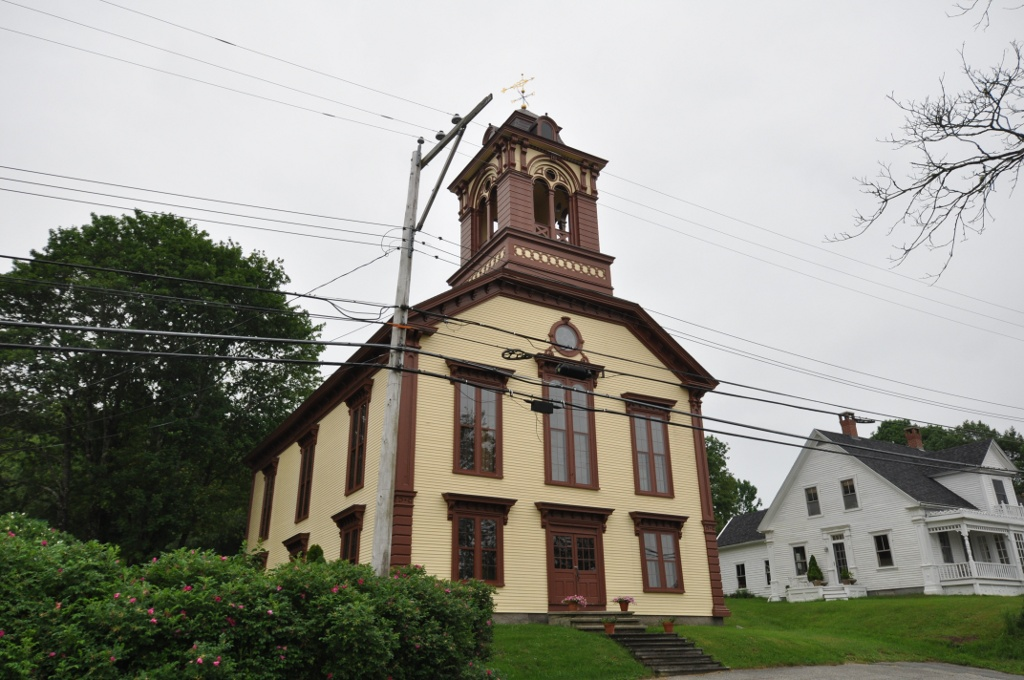

- Location within Maine Location within the United States
- Location: ME 92, Machiasport, Maine
- Coordinates: 44°41′51″N 67°23′40″W
- Area: 1 acre (0.40 ha)
- Built: 1873
- Architect: Andrew R. Gilson
- Architectural style: Italianate
- NRHP reference No.: 77000089
- Added to NRHP: November 23, 1977

Liberty Hall is the historic town hall of Machiasport, Maine. Located on Maine State Route 92 in the town's village center, it is a prominent local example of Italianate architecture, and has served as a civic and community meeting space for more than 100 years. It was built in 1873, and was added to the National Register of Historic Places in 1977.

== Description and history ==
Liberty Hall is set on the west side of Port Road (Maine Route 92) in the dispersed village center of Machiasport. It stands on a rise, facing east toward the Machias River. It is a two-story wood-frame structure, with a front-facing gable roof, clapboard siding, and a stone foundation. The roof is topped at the front by a small tower, which has an elaborately decorated open belvidere (viewing platform) with round-arch openings and quoined corner supports, topped by a mansard roof and weathervane. The roof is a replica of the building's original, which was at one time replaced by a shallow-pitch pyramidal roof. The main facade is symmetrical, with a center double-door entrance topped by a lintel with bracketed molding. Flanking the entrance are doubled sash windows, taller versions of which rise on the second floor. The central second floor windows have round-arch tops. Similar windows adorn the sides, all capped with stylistically similar lintels. The building corners are quoined at the first level, and pilastered at the second. The interior is arranged with a vestibule area in the front, a meeting space on the first floor, and a performance auditorium with stage on the second floor.

Construction of the hall was authorized by the town meeting in 1873, and the building was completed the following year by Andrew Gilson, a Machias contractor and politician. The hall was used not just for town meetings, but also served as a venue for community events, meetings of community organizations such as the Grange, and as a performance venue for traveling shows. The town closed the building in 2000 due to structural conditions, and renovation efforts are currently underway by the Friends of Liberty Hall. The exterior has been restored (included the restoration of the tower's original appearance), and funds are being raised to restore the interior.

== See also ==
- National Register of Historic Places listings in Washington County, Maine
