= Fort O'Brien =

- U.S. National Register of Historic Places
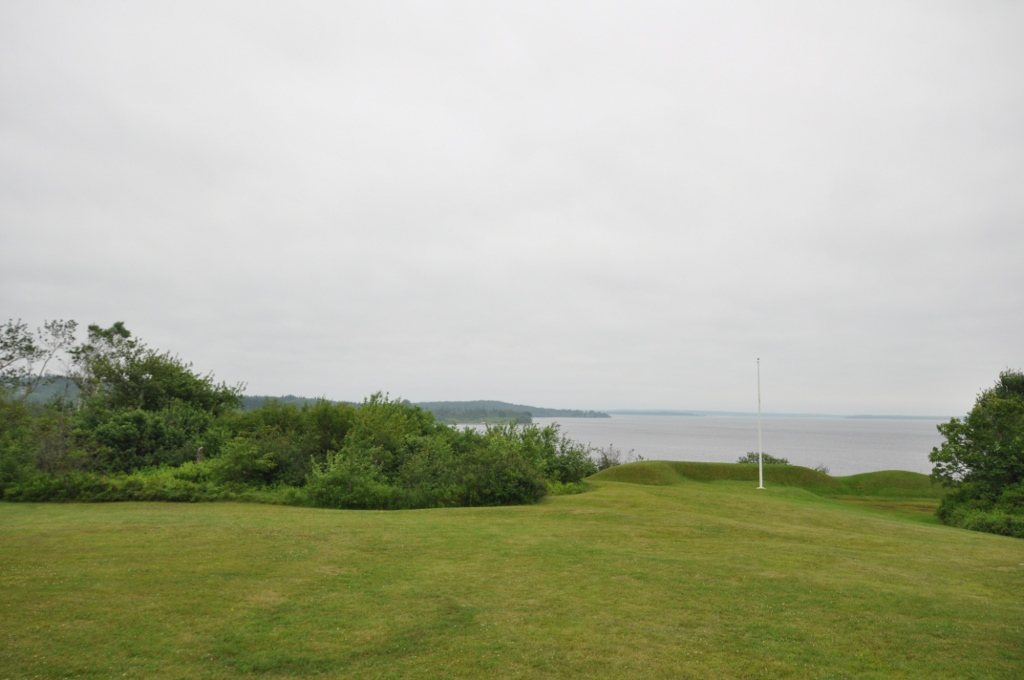
- View of fort remains: Revolutionary War on the left, Civil War on the right

- Location within Maine
- Interactive map of Fort O'Brien
- Nearest city: Machiasport, Maine
- Coordinates: 44°41′22″N 67°23′48″W
- Area: 2 acres (0.81 ha)
- Built: 1775
- NRHP reference No.: 69000024
- Added to NRHP: October 01, 1969

Fort O'Brien State Historic Site, also known as Fort Machias, preserves the remains of a fort located in Machiasport, Maine that was built and destroyed three times over a 90-year period. It was involved in military actions during the American Revolutionary War and the War of 1812, and was listed on the National Register of Historic Places. It is now managed by the Maine Department of Conservation's Bureau of Parks and Lands, and is open between Memorial Day and Labor Day.

== Description and history ==
Fort O'Brien is located on the western shore of the Machias River, a short way north of its mouth at Machias Bay and south of the village center of Machiasport. It is a roughly 2-acre (0.81 ha) parcel, with a small parking area and a grassy area near the riverbank where the fortifications originally stood. Earthworks and a flagpole mark the location of the Civil War defenses, while the Revolutionary War-era earthworks, located just to their north, are obscured by scrubby growth.

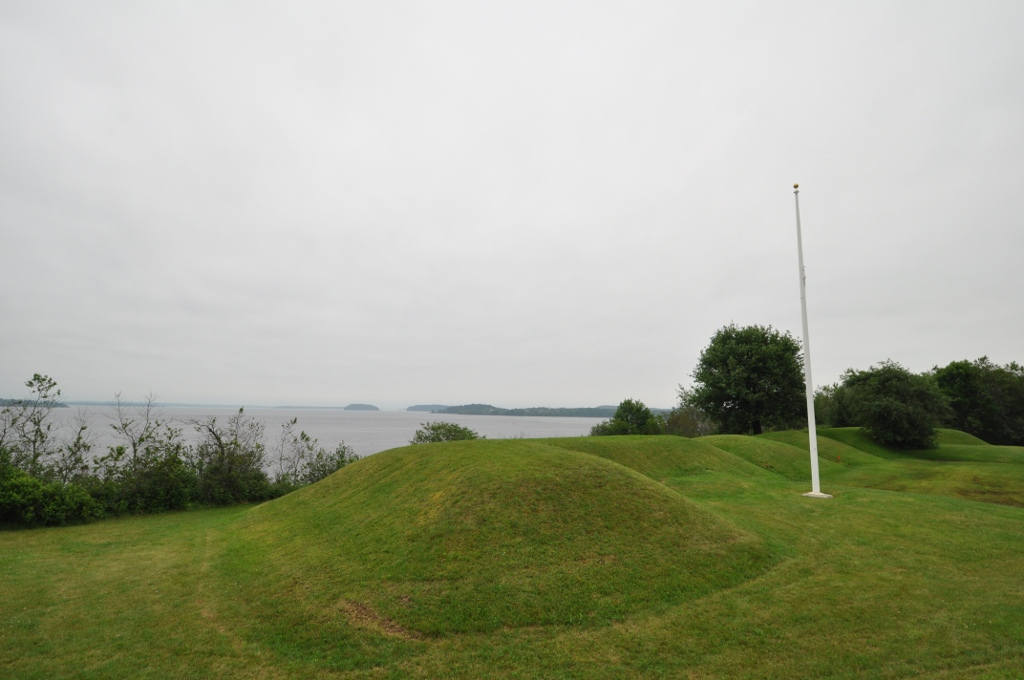
The Civil War batteries

When the American Revolutionary War broke out in April 1775, the Machias area became one of interest to British authorities in besieged Boston as a source of lumber and supplies. An expedition to the area to acquire materials resulted in the naval Battle of Machias on June 11–12, 1775, in which a small Royal Navy ship was captured by the colonists led by Jeremiah O'Brien, for whom the fort is named. After this event a number of fortifications were erected on the Machias River, including a four-gun battery at this point. This fortification was destroyed when the British returned in force in 1777, sparking a second battle.

In the War of 1812, American forces garrisoned the fort, which often held British POWs brought in by privateers. In 1814, the British returned to Machias, destroying this fortification and burning its barracks in 1814. A five-gun battery was installed at the site in 1863, during the American Civil War, but saw no action. Although its military equipment was removed, a Civil War-era 12-pound "Napoleon" cannon now stands on site.

The fortification was deeded to the state by the federal government in 1923.

== See also ==
- National Register of Historic Places listings in Washington County, Maine
