= Maine State Route 93 =

State highway in Oxford County, Maine, US

State Route 93

Route information
- Maintained by MaineDOT
- Length: 10.94 mi (17.61 km)
- Existed: 1953–present

Major junctions
- South end: US 302 in Bridgton
- North end: SR 5 in Lovell

Location
- Country: United States
- State: Maine
- Counties: Oxford

Highway system
- Maine State Highway System; Interstate; US; State; Auto trails; Lettered highways
← SR 92	→ SR 94

State Route 93 (SR 93) is part of Maine's system of numbered state highways, located in Oxford County. It is a minor highway in the western part of the state, running 11 miles (18 km) from U.S. Route 302 (US 302) in Bridgton to SR 5 in Lovell. It is signed as a north–south highway, but runs roughly southeast-to-northwest.

== Route description ==
SR 93 begins in the south at US 302 about two miles (3.2 km) west of downtown Bridgton. The road leaves town to the northwest, paralleling Highland Lake and Stearns Pond as it enters the town of Sweden. SR 93 continues northwest until reaching Waterford Road, where it turns due west towards the town of Lovell. Shortly after crossing the town line, SR 93 reaches its northern terminus at SR 5.

== Major intersections ==
The entire route is in Oxford County.

Location	mi	km	Destinations	Notes
Bridgton	0.00	0.00	US 302 (North High Street) to SR 117 – Bridgton, Fryeburg	
Lovell	10.94	17.61	SR 5 (Main Street) – Fryeburg, Stoneham	
1.000 mi = 1.609 km; 1.000 km = 0.621 mi
