= Burnham Tavern =

- U.S. National Register of Historic Places
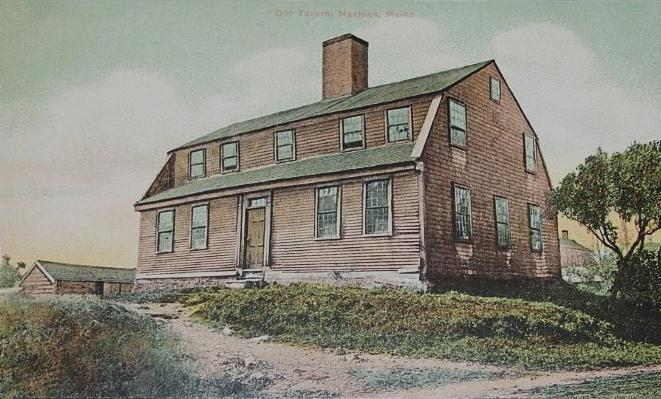
- Postcard view of tavern, 1911

- Location within Maine Location within the United States
- Location: 14 Colonial Way, Machias, Maine
- Coordinates: 44°42′50″N 67°27′36″W
- Area: 0.5 acres (0.20 ha)
- Built: 1770
- Architect: Burnham, Job
- NRHP reference No.: 73000152
- Added to NRHP: April 11, 1973

The Burnham Tavern is a historic tavern at 14 Colonial Way in Machias, Maine, United States. Built in 1770, it is one of the oldest surviving buildings in the Machias area, and is known for its locally significant role in the American Revolutionary War. The tavern is operated as the Burnham Tavern Museum by the Hannah Weston Chapter of the Daughters of the American Revolution (DAR). Featuring late 18th period furnishings, the house includes artifacts from the 1775 Battle of Machias, the first naval battle of the Revolution. The building was listed on the National Register of Historic Places in 1973.

== Description and history ==
The Burnham Tavern is located on the south side of Colonial Way in downtown Machias, just south of its junction with Free Street. It is a rectangular two-story wood-frame structure, oriented to face east, presenting a side to the street. The roof is gambrel, with a clerestory section of windows on the second floor. The main facade is five bays wide, and the building has a large central chimney. The entry vestibule has a distinctive staircase that branches left and right, providing independent access to the second-floor bedrooms. There are parlor rooms on either side of the chimney, and a kitchen with large fireplace taking up most of the western half of the building.

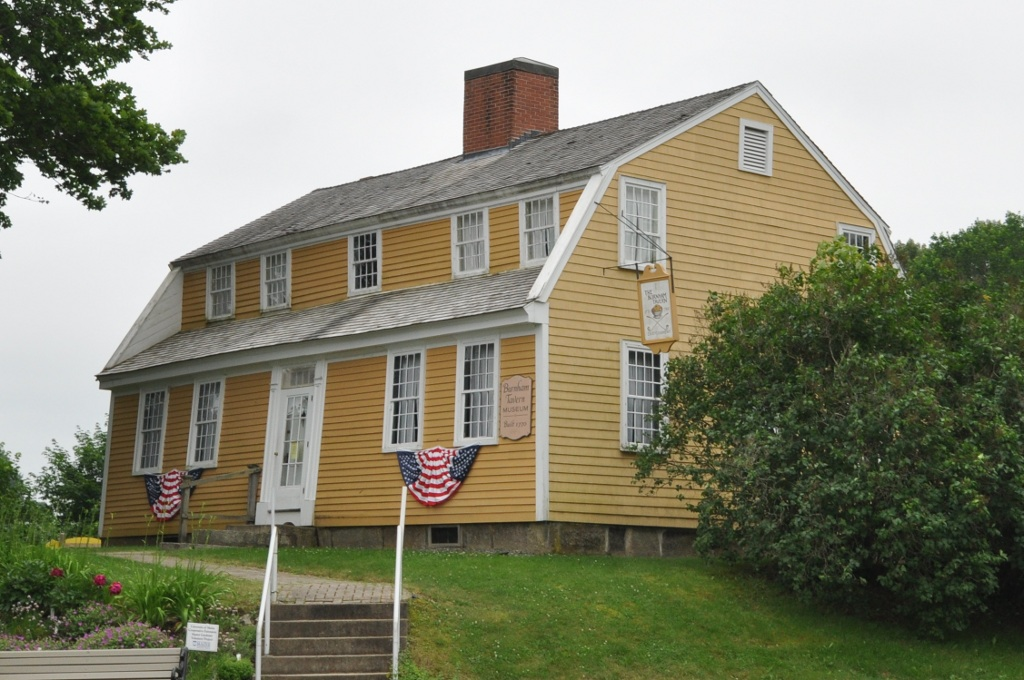
The tavern in 2013

English settlers first arrived in the Machias area in 1763, and the tavern was built in 1770 by Job Burnham. It is the only building in the Machias area with a documented connection to the American Revolutionary War, as it was used as a meeting place by the local militia, particularly during the events that led to the 1775 Battle of Machias, one of the first naval encounters of the war. It was also used as a hospital for treating the wounded of both sides in the battle, and artifacts related to the capture of the Margaretta during this battle are on display. The building continued to act as a major local social meeting point into the 20th century.

== See also ==
- National Register of Historic Places listings in Washington County, Maine
