= Christ Episcopal Church (Gardiner, Maine) =

Historic church in Maine, United States

- U.S. National Register of Historic Places
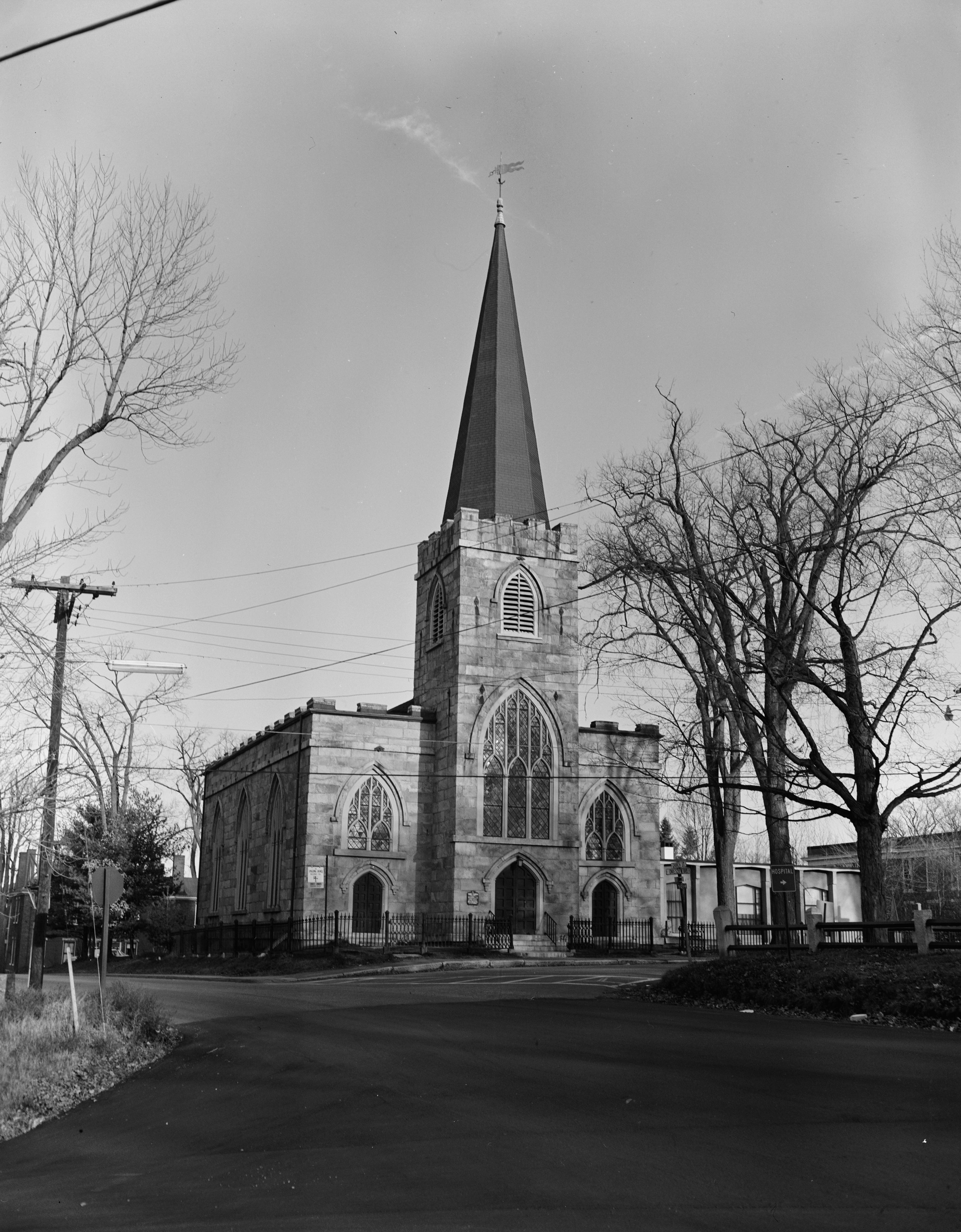

- Location within Maine Location within the United States
- Location: 2 Dresden Ave., Gardiner, Maine
- Coordinates: 44°13′39″N 69°46′32″W
- Area: 1 acre (0.40 ha)
- Built: 1820
- Architectural style: Gothic Revival
- NRHP reference No.: 73000129
- Added to NRHP: July 24, 1973

Christ Episcopal Church is a historic church located at 1 Dresden Avenue in Gardiner, Maine. It was built in 1820 for the oldest congregation in the Episcopal Diocese of Maine. It is the oldest known example of ecclesiastical Gothic Revival architecture in New England, and was listed on the National Register of Historic Places in 1973.

The church reported 134 members in 2015 and 216 members in 2023; no membership statistics were reported in 2024 parochial reports. Plate and pledge income reported for the congregation in 2024 was $144,695. Average Sunday attendance (ASA) in 2024 was 92 persons.

== Description and history ==
Christ Episcopal Church is located in central Gardiner, on the east side the town common and the junction of Church and Dresden Streets. It is a rectangular stone structure with a square tower projecting from the center of the front (west-facing) facade. The main roof has flat wings and a gabled center, and is surrounded by low battlement-style crenellations. The square portion of the tower is topped by similar crenellations, with an octagonal spire above. The front facade has entrances in the tower and the flanking sections, set in lancet-arched openings. Above each is a Gothic window with tracery, that in the tower considerably larger. The side elevations each have three tall Gothic windows.

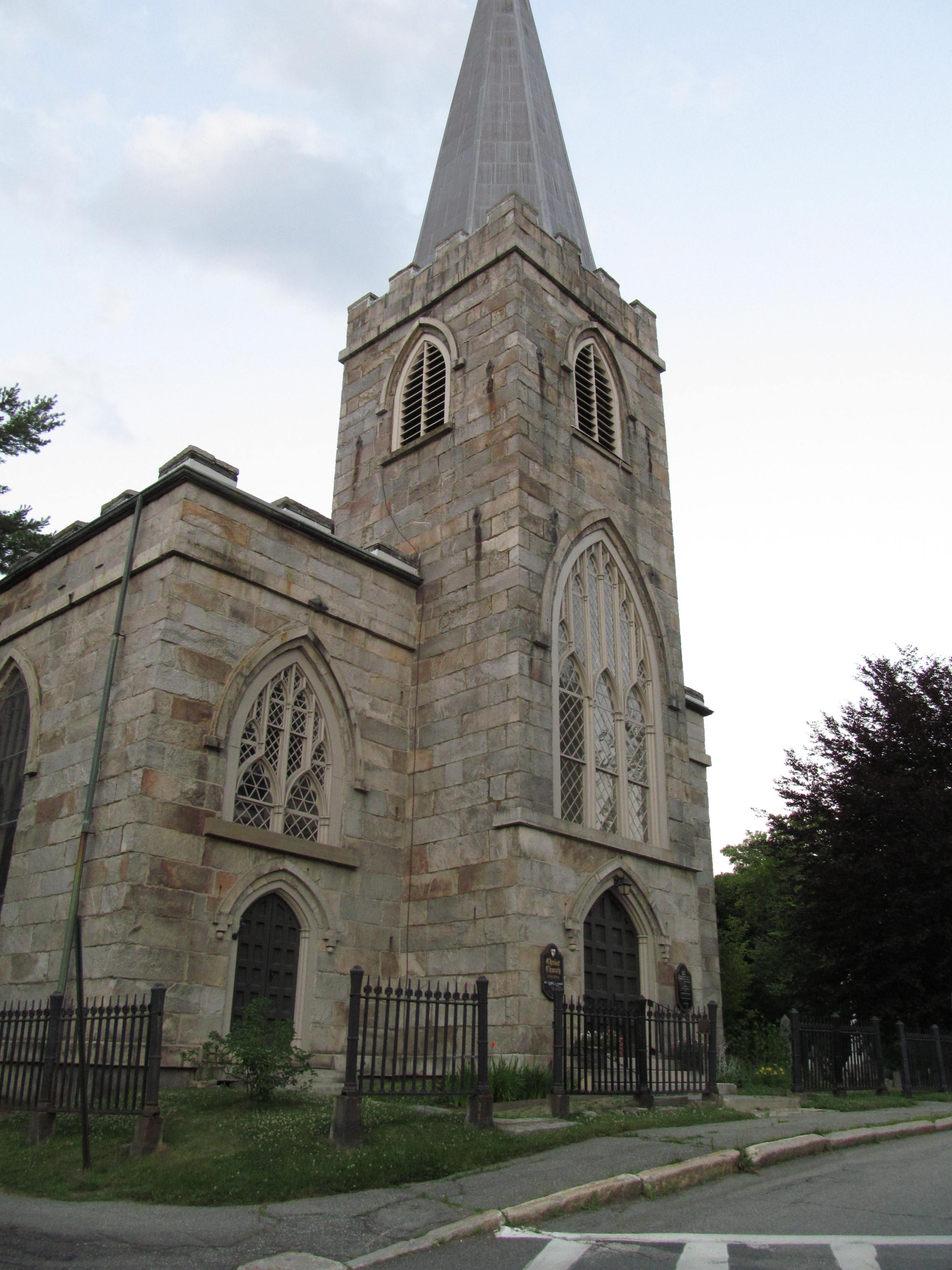
The church in 2012

The Episcopal Church in Gardiner was organized in 1772 by Sylvester Gardiner, a major landowner for whom the city is named. This building, constructed in 1820, is its third sanctuary, the first having succumbed to fire in 1792, and the congregation having outgrown the second. It was designed by the Rev. Samuel Farmar Jarvis in what was then termed the "Gothick" style, which was then without precedent in New England.

== See also ==
- National Register of Historic Places listings in Kennebec County, Maine
