= Helen's Restaurant =

Diner in Machias, Maine, United States

Helen's Restaurant is a diner in Machias, Maine, United States. It was established in 1950. It is known for wild Maine blueberry pie. In July 2014, the restaurant burned down. The building was rebuilt and reopened in 2015.
