= Porter Memorial Library (Maine) =

- U.S. National Register of Historic Places
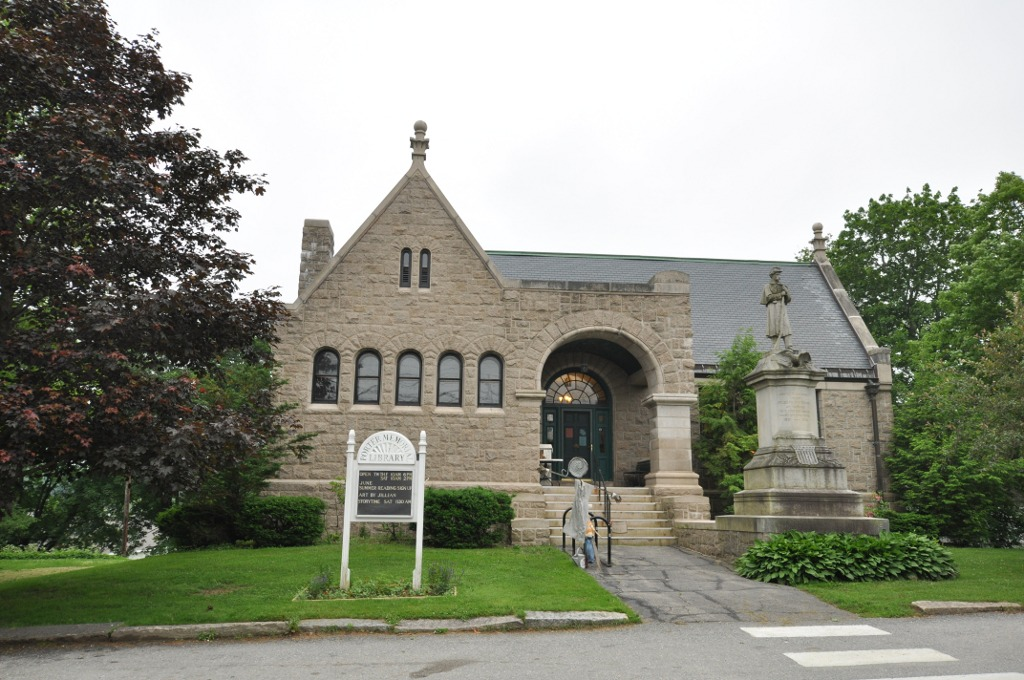

- Location within Maine Location within the United States
- Location: Court St., Machias, Maine
- Coordinates: 44°42′55″N 67°27′36″W
- Area: 0.5 acres (0.20 ha)
- Built: 1893
- Architect: George A. Clough
- Architectural style: Romanesque
- NRHP reference No.: 78000208
- Added to NRHP: January 20, 1978

Porter Memorial Library is the public library of Machias, Maine. It is located at 92 Court Street in the center Machias, in an architecturally distinguished Romanesque Revival building, whose construction was funded by native son Henry Homes Porter. The building was listed on the National Register of Historic Places in 1978.

== Architecture and history ==
The library is located near the center of Machias's downtown area, at the junction of Court and Free Streets. It is a 1-1/2 story masonry building, constructed out of ashlar granite in the Romanesque Revival style. It has an T-shaped plan, the stem of the T paralleling Court Street, with gable ends facing to the north, west, and south, that are capped by Romanesque pinnacles. The main entrance is in the northern corner of the T, sheltered by a portico with large round arches. The adjacent gable end has a band of five smaller round-arch windows on the first floor, and a pair of slender round-arch windows in the attic level.

The Machias Library Association was formed about 1815 by Rufus K. Porter, a local attorney. His son, Henry Homes Porter, was a successful railroad executive. With the library of his hometown lacking in funding and a permanent home, he gave $1,500 in 1891 to stabilize its financial situation, and promised an additional $9,000 for construction of a permanent home. The present building was designed by Boston, Massachusetts architect George A. Clough and was completed in 1893. It was named to honor both Porters for their role in its founding.

== See also ==
- National Register of Historic Places listings in Washington County, Maine
