= Maine State Route 92 =

State highway in Washington County, Maine, US

State Route 92

Route information
- Maintained by MaineDOT
- Length: 4.12 mi (6.63 km)
- Existed: 1939–present

Major junctions
- West end: US 1 in Machias
- East end: Old County Road in Machiasport

Location
- Country: United States
- State: Maine
- Counties: Washington

Highway system
- Maine State Highway System; Interstate; US; State; Auto trails; Lettered highways
← SR 91	→ SR 93

State Route 92 (SR 92) is part of Maine's systems of numbered state highways, located in Washington County. It runs from U.S. Route 1 (US 1) in Machias to an unnumbered road intersection in Machiasport. The route is 4.12 miles (6.63 km) long.

== Route description ==
SR 92 begins at an intersection with US 1 (Dublin Street) just south of its crossing of the Machias River and north of the University of Maine at Machias campus. The road heads west for about 100 feet (30 m) around a small memorial park before turning north onto O'Brien Avenue. It heads past a few houses before marking a sharp turn to the east onto Elm Street. After passing a few more houses and a small factory, SR 92 heads into a more wooded area with only a few houses lining the road. After entering Machaisport, the road starts to bend towards the southeast. Rim Road soon intersects the state route which provides access to Machaisport Station, across the Machais River. The road name becomes Port Road and more houses begin to line the road. Turning to the south, it now closely follows the shoreline of Machias Bay. The road curves to the west to enter the town center of Machaisport. SR 92 ends at an intersection with Old Country Road though Port Road continues south as an unnumbered state-maintained highway.

== Major junctions ==
The entire route is in Washington County.

Location	mi	km	Destinations	Notes
Machias	0.00	0.00	US 1 (Dublin Street) – Ellsworth, Downtown Machias, Calais	
Machiasport	4.12	6.63	Port Road / Old Country Road	
1.000 mi = 1.609 km; 1.000 km = 0.621 mi
