= Machias, Maine =

Town in Maine, United States

- Town
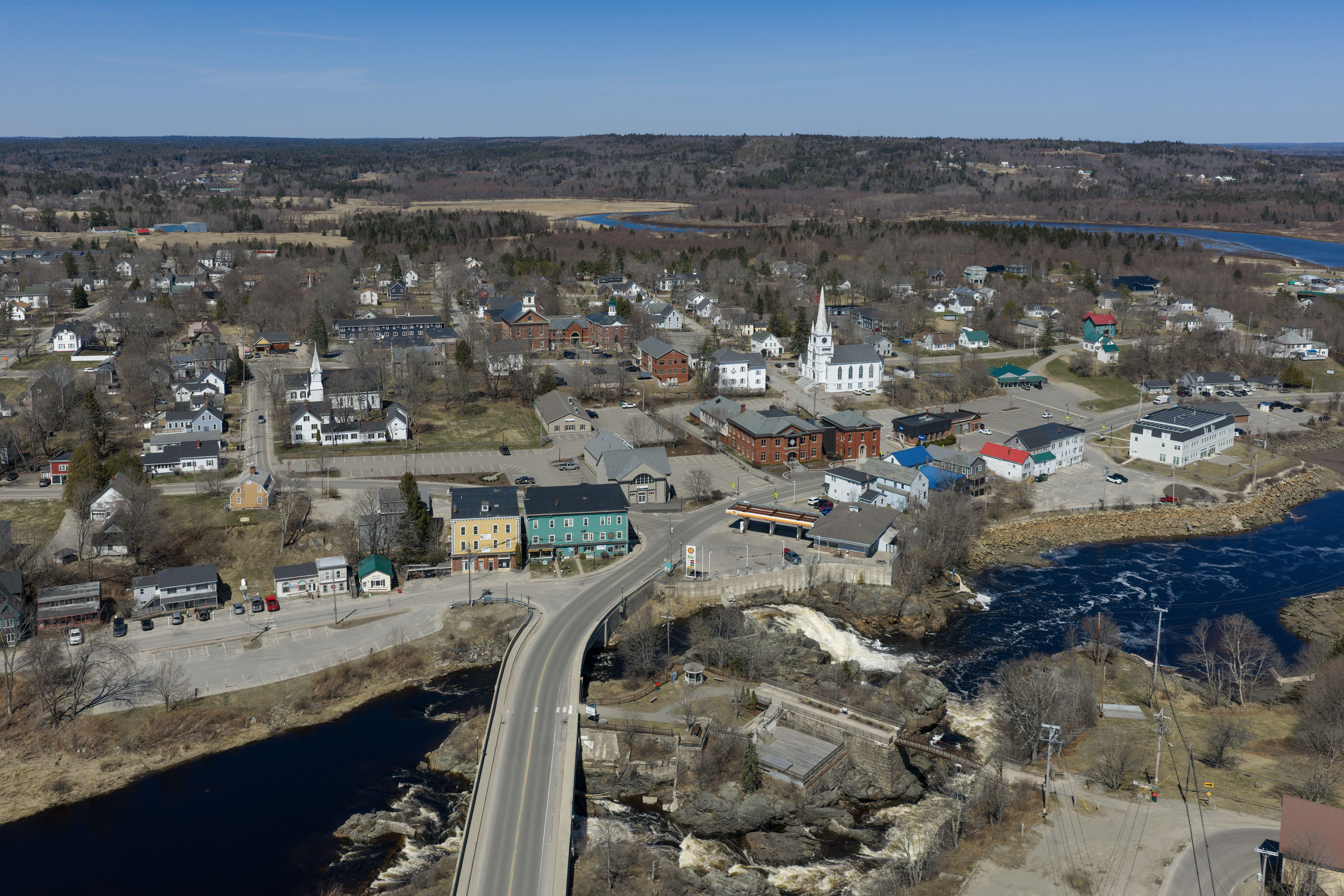
- Downtown

- Seal

- Location within Maine Location within the United States
- Coordinates: 44°42′51″N 67°27′30″W
- Country: United States
- State: Maine
- County: Washington
- Incorporated: June 23, 1784

Government
  - Type: Town meeting

Area
  - Total: 14.80 sq mi (38.33 km^{2})
  - Land: 13.87 sq mi (35.92 km^{2})
  - Water: 0.93 sq mi (2.41 km^{2}) 6.28%
- Elevation: 141 ft (43 m)

Population (2020)
  - Total: 2,060
  - Density: 148/sq mi (57.3/km^{2})
- Time zone: UTC-5 (Eastern (EST))
  - Summer (DST): UTC-4 (EDT)
- ZIP Code: 04654
- Area code: 207
- FIPS code: 23-41960
- Website: machiasme.gov

Machias (/məˈtʃaɪ.əs/, mə-CHY-əss) is a town in and the county seat of Washington County in Down East Maine, United States. As of the 2020 census, the town population was 2,060. It contains the census-designated place of the same name. It is home to the University of Maine at Machias and Machias Valley Airport, a small public airport owned by the town. The word Machias roughly translates in Passamaquoddy as "bad little falls", a reference to the Machias River. Machias was the site of the first naval battle of the American Revolution.

== History ==
The English first became acquainted with the area in 1633, when Richard Vines established a trading post for the Plymouth Company at what is now Machiasport.

=== Raid on Machias (1633) ===
A fierce contest was at this time going on between France and England. Charles de la Tour, the French commander of Acadia, made a descent upon it from his seat at Port Royal, killing two of its six defenders, and carrying the others away with their merchandise. No persistent attempt was again made to hold this point by the English or French for upwards of 120 years.

In 1704, Major Benjamin Church found and captured here John Bretoon, of Jersey, with his wife and child, and M. Lattre, with his wife and three children. In 1734 the place was visited by Jonathan Belcher, governor of Massachusetts.

In 1762, on account of the scarcity of hay arising from the drought, Isaiah Foster, Isaac Larahee, and others from Scarborough visited the place in search of grass, finding a great quantity of it in the marshes. Quite a number of persons settled here the following year and, having thus become acquainted with the advantages of the place, 80 persons, of whom no less than 54 were from Scarborough, petitioned the General Court for a grant of this vicinity for settlement, which was allowed in 1770. Among those who became residents in 1763 were Samuel and Sylvanus Scott, T. D. and G. Libby. S. and J. Stone, W. B. and J. Larabee, D. and J. Hill, Daniel Fogg, and J. Foster, most of whom located at the West Fall, and Messrs. Munson, Foster, Sevey, and Scott, settled at East Falls. Morris O'Brien and his sons, in 1765, built a double sawmill at the former place.

Hon. Stephen Jones settled here in 1768. His son was for many years a judge of the Common Pleas and judge of Probate in Washington County. In 1770, many others having come in, several mills were erected on the East and West rivers, and one on Middle River.

=== American Revolution ===
==== The Battle of Machias (1775) ====
The first naval battle of the American Revolution was the Battle of Machias. In his History of the Navy of the United States of America James Fenimore Cooper dubbed this engagement "the Lexington of the Seas". This battle, which occurred in June 1775 at Machiasport after townspeople refused to provide the British with lumber for barracks, led to the capture of the armed schooner HMS Margaretta by settlers under Captain Jeremiah O'Brien and Capt. Benjamin Foster.

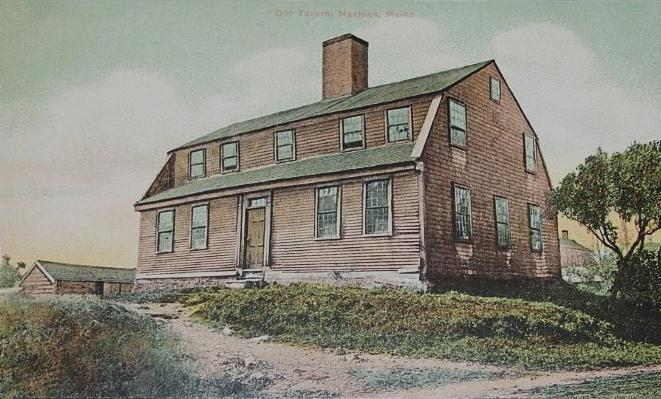
Burnham Tavern in 1911

It fell to the lot of the Machias people to initiate the Revolutionary struggle on the sea, as the people of Lexington and Concord had done upon the land. Capt. Ichabod Jones, of Boston, obtained leave to send a small vessel with provisions to Machias on condition of returning with a cargo of wood and lumber. Accordingly, his sloop, convoyed by the armed English schooner Margaretta, commanded by Lieutenant Moore, arrived here on the May 9, bringing the first intelligence of the bloody conflicts at Lexington and Concord. It was not many days before the inhabitants made known their sentiments by the erection of a liberty pole at a prominent point in the settlement. Lieutenant Moore, learning the significance of the pole, ordered it to be removed, under a threat of firing on the town. By the influence of Mr. Jones, the British commander was induced to delay the execution of his threat from day to day, while several meetings were held by the inhabitants to consider the matter; but they every time voted not to take down the pole. The story of the liberty pole has been shown to be a fabrication by John O'Brien in 1831. No references to the pole are found prior to 1831. The final meeting was to be held on Monday, and on the previous Sunday, a plot was laid to capture Lieutenant Moore at the meeting-house as the service closed: but seeing through the window some armed men crossing the river above, he took the alarm, sprang through the open window, and escaped to his vessel. An armed company of the settlers followed down to the shore, when the Margaretta, after firing a few shots over the settlement, slipped down the river.

Early the next morning, Benjamin Foster, Jeremiah O’Brien and his five stalwart brothers, and some others, gathered at the wharf, and took possession of Jones' wood sloop; then by shouts they gathered the men of the settlement on board. A plan of capturing the Margaretta was made known, the timid were allowed to go ashore, while the bolder spirits, only a few armed with muskets, others with pitchforks and axes, sailed down the river to attack the British schooner. Another company, in a small coaster, followed them. They found the schooner in the bay, and ran alongside, with the intention of boarding. She received them with a discharge of several guns, muskets and hand grenades, by which several were killed. The vessels fell apart, only John O'Brien, one of the six brothers, having got on board the enemy. Several of the British instantly fired at him, but not a bullet touched him. Then they charged upon him with their bayonets; but before they could reach him he was overboard, and swimming towards the sloop, which he reached without other harm than a wetting. The only cannon possessed by the patriots was a wall piece, which they balanced on the rail, and fired with destructive effect. The muskets, also, did good service, and the decks of the Margaretta were cleared. Several of the enemy had fallen, including the commander, and when the vessels were brought together again, the officer in command fled below in terror, and the crew yielded at once.

On June 26 following, the Massachusetts Congress passed a formal vote of thanks to the heroes of this affair. The Margaretta was the first British vessel captured by the Americans. Foster and Jeremiah O'Brien were soon after commissioned for privateering, and were very successful.

Machias is home to Burnham Tavern, a 1770 tavern listed on the National Register of Historic Places, which is now a museum housing mementos from the Battle of Machias. The tavern is one of 21 buildings in the United States designated as most significant to the American Revolution.

==== Raid on Machias, 1777 ====
Machias soon became aggressive, and an expedition was filled out to aid the patriots in New Brunswick and Nova Scotia. Thinking it necessary to crush this rebellious town, the governor of Nova Scotia, in 1777, sent Sir George Collier with four vessels and eighty marines to accomplish this purpose. They arrived in the bay early in August, and after burning a tide-mill, two dwellings, two barns and a guard house, and committing other depredations below, one of the brigs was towed by barges to the mouth of the Middle River, within half a mile of Machias Falls. Here such a lively fire was poured down upon them from the high banks that the crews of the barges were driven on board the brig, whence again all were driven below deck, and the brig drifted helplessly down the stream. Every man in the place able to bear arms was now upon the shore, Major Stiliman being in charge; while on the other side of the river were forty or fifty Passamaquoddy Indians sent by Colonel John Allan, and led by Joseph Neeala, their chief. The Indians raised their peculiar yell, which the white people imitated, until the woods rang with them; and the British were glad to reach the bay again. A notable incident in this contest was the journey of Hannah Weston, with another young woman from the Pleasant River settlement, 20 miles (32 km) west, to bring powder for the patriots. A day or two later the squadron sailed away.

War of 1812. On September 1, 1814, U.S. forces evacuated Fort O'Brien and on September 4, Machias, the county seat of Washington County was occupied by British troops under Lieutenant-Colonel Andrew Pilkington. Officers commanding the U.S. militia in Washington County wrote to the British to confirm that they would not take up arms against the British if the inhabitants were protected in their private property and usual occupations. The civilians of the County gave a similar assurance to the British and the county was garrisoned by the British until the end of the war. The county was returned to US sovereignty under the Treaty of Ghent of 1814.

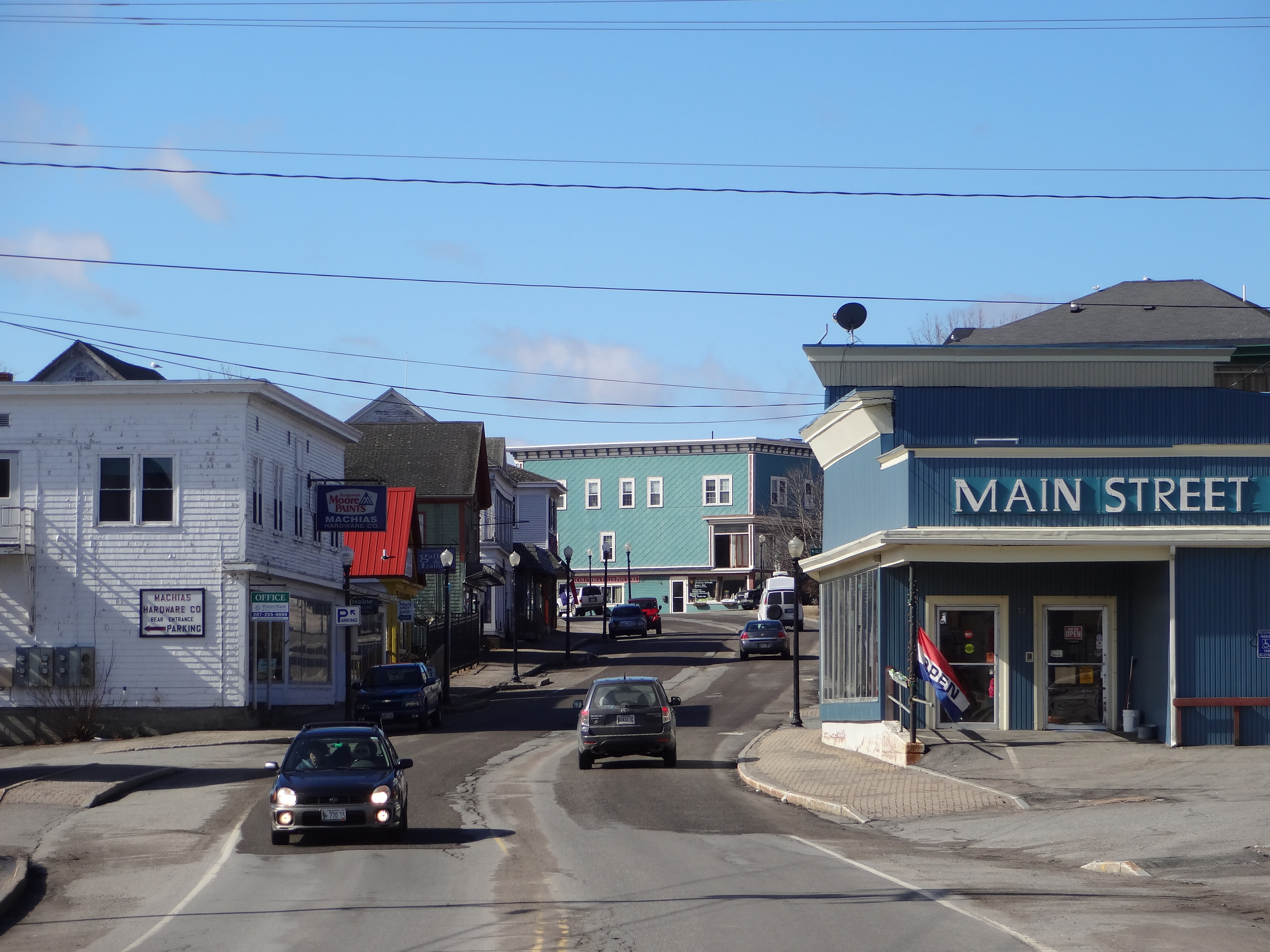
Maine Street in Machias

== Buildings ==
Among the first who built mills in the place were Ichabod Jones and Jonathan Longfellow. The first meeting-house was built in 1774 on a lot given by George Libby, on the site of which Libby Hall now stands. The building was 42 feet (13 m) long, 25 feet (7.6 m) wide, and one story in height. In 1786, by vote of the town, £200 were raised to build two meeting-houses.

Among the fine buildings of Machias are the court-house and jail, constructed of brick and granite; the former in 1855, at a cost of $25,000, and the latter in 1857, at a cost of $35,000. The United States building containing the post office and custom-house is also of brick and granite. It was built in 1871, at a cost of $30,000. Centre Street Congregational Church and Libby Hall are fine wooden buildings. There are also many private residences. The streets are adorned with shade trees, and the town bears many marks of age and culture.

George S. Hillard, who died in Boston in 1879, was a native of Machias. He was a leading member of the Suffolk bar, held various honorable public offices, and was the author of several popular works in the departments of geography, history, and travels, and of a series of school readers known as Hillard's Readers.

The Porter Memorial Library has been the town's public library since it opened in the 1890s.

== Newspapers ==
The first newspaper of Machias was called The Eastern State. It was published by Jeremiah Baich, and bore the date of December 23, 1823. There were two weekly papers, the Machias Republican, an excellent republican sheet, published every Saturday, by C. O. Furbush, and the Machias Union, of which Messrs. Drisko & Parlin were the publishers. Its day of publication is Tuesday, and its politics were firmly democratic. The current weekly newspaper is the Machias Valley News Observer, published every Wednesday.

== Church ==
The first organized church in Machias and in Washington County was Congregationalist, and dates from September 1782. Rev. James Lyon, the first pastor, was a graduate of Princeton College, and came to Machias in 1771; continuing in this service in the east and west villages until his death in 1795. He was a man of more than ordinary ability, of deep piety, and an earnest patriot. This society still continues, and is said to be one of the largest in the state. The other societies are Baptist, Methodist, Universalist and Catholic. There is a public library in the village containing about 2,000 volumes. All have good church-edifices. The village has an excellent high school, with a graded system. There are nine public schoolhouses, some of which are superior structures. The valuation of estates in 1870 was $978,135. In 1880 it was $779,588. The population in 1870 was 2,525. In 1880 it was 2,203.

The Massachusetts General Court incorporated Machias as a town on June 23, 1784. It first encompassed present-day East Machias, Whitneyville, Machias and Marshfield. It was the first town incorporated between the Penobscot and the St. Croix rivers. East Machias was set off January 24, 1826; Whitneyville, February 10, 1845; Machiasport, January 24, 1826; and Marshfield, June 30, 1846.

In the 19th century, it developed into a major railroad center for northern lumber operations.

The 2004 PBS show, Colonial House, was filmed in the Machiasport area, with scenes in Machias.

== Industry ==
In the late nineteenth century, vessels of 600 tons received cargoes within 300 feet (91 m) of the mills. Within the town were eight saw-mills manufacturing long and short lumber, a sash, blind and door factory, one or more ship-yards, an iron foundry and machine-shop, two grainmills, a carding-mill, canned-food factories, carriage-factories, sail-loft, two printing establishments, a tow-boat company, silver mining company, etc. The Machias Savings Bank held, at the beginning of the fiscal year of 1880, in deposits and profits, the sum of $339,708.36. The town had a connection with Portland by steamboat-line, and with Bangor and Calais by a line of stages. A railroad for freight connecting Machiasport and Whitneyville known as the Palmer & Machiasport Railroad used to pass through the town, but no longer exists.

Today, Machias is the largest town by population in the southern half of Washington County, and is the commercial center for a large geographic area spanning the easternmost section of Maine's coastline from Bar Harbor to Lubec. The town is home to the University of Maine at Machias, once known as the teacher’s college, now a branch campus of the University of Maine at Orono; the headquarters of the Machias Savings Bank (with branches located throughout the state of Maine); the DownEast Community Hospital; and the Washington County court house; as well as several stores, gas stations, and a supermarket. Among other establishments, Helen's Restaurant operates in Machias.

== Geography ==
Video of Little Bad Falls

Machias is situated midway on the south shore of the county, on the Machias River, near its mouth. The western portion extends southward to Little Kennebec Bay. Machiasport bounds it on the south-east, also on the east with East Machias and Marshfield. The latter also bounds it on the north, and Whitneyville and Jonesboro on the west. The surface of the town is uneven, but fertile. The rocks along the river are trap but there is an extensive granite quarry within three miles (4.8 km) of the falls. The water power of this town consists of a series of falls on the Machias River, at the head of navigation, six miles (9.7 km) above the river's mouth, and three above its junction with the East Machias River. The gross power of the falls is that of about 937 horses.

According to the United States Census Bureau, the town has a total area of 14.80 square miles (38.33 km^{2}), of which 13.87 square miles (35.92 km^{2}) is land and 0.93 square miles (2.41 km^{2}) is water. The town is located at the head of Machias Bay and Little Kennebec Bay on the Gulf of Maine, part of the Atlantic Ocean.

Machias is crossed by U. S. Route 1 and 1A, and by state routes 92 and 192. It is bordered by the towns of Machiasport to the east, Roque Bluffs to the south, Whitneyville to the west, and Marshfield to the north. Separated by water, it is near the town of East Machias to the north.

=== Climate ===
This climatic region is typified by large seasonal temperature differences, with warm to hot (and often humid) summers and cold (sometimes severely cold) winters. According to the Köppen Climate Classification system, Machias has a humid continental climate, abbreviated "Dfb" on climate maps.

Climate data for Machias, Maine
Month	Jan	Feb	Mar	Apr	May	Jun	Jul	Aug	Sep	Oct	Nov	Dec	Year
Record high °F (°C)	56 (13)	62 (17)	71 (22)	83 (28)	97 (36)	94 (34)	98 (37)	104 (40)	95 (35)	84 (29)	73 (23)	64 (18)	104 (40)
Mean daily maximum °F (°C)	28.4 (−2.0)	31.6 (−0.2)	39.0 (3.9)	49.9 (9.9)	61.4 (16.3)	70.2 (21.2)	75.4 (24.1)	75.1 (23.9)	67.4 (19.7)	56.4 (13.6)	45.5 (7.5)	34.6 (1.4)	52.9 (11.6)
Mean daily minimum °F (°C)	9.6 (−12.4)	12.6 (−10.8)	21.2 (−6.0)	32.0 (0.0)	41.2 (5.1)	49.4 (9.7)	54.9 (12.7)	54.7 (12.6)	47.6 (8.7)	37.9 (3.3)	29.8 (−1.2)	17.6 (−8.0)	34.0 (1.1)
Record low °F (°C)	−31 (−35)	−22 (−30)	−13 (−25)	7 (−14)	24 (−4)	31 (−1)	36 (2)	32 (0)	21 (−6)	17 (−8)	1 (−17)	−26 (−32)	−31 (−35)
Average rainfall inches (mm)	4.46 (113)	3.90 (99)	4.63 (118)	4.48 (114)	4.01 (102)	4.33 (110)	3.53 (90)	3.38 (86)	4.15 (105)	5.81 (148)	5.39 (137)	6.06 (154)	54.13 (1,375)
Average snowfall inches (cm)	19.0 (48)	18.6 (47)	17.3 (44)	2.6 (6.6)	0 (0)	0 (0)	0 (0)	0 (0)	0 (0)	0.1 (0.25)	2.0 (5.1)	15.3 (39)	74.9 (189.95)
Source 1:
Source 2:

== Demographics ==
Historical population
Census	Pop.	Note	%±
1790	818		—
1800	1,014		24.0%
1810	1,570		54.8%
1820	2,033		29.5%
1830	1,021		−49.8%
1840	1,351		32.3%
1850	1,590		17.7%
1860	2,256		41.9%
1870	2,525		11.9%
1880	2,203		−12.8%
1890	2,035		−7.6%
1900	2,082		2.3%
1910	2,089		0.3%
1920	2,152		3.0%
1930	1,856		−13.8%
1940	1,954		5.3%
1950	2,063		5.6%
1960	2,614		26.7%
1970	2,441		−6.6%
1980	2,458		0.7%
1990	2,569		4.5%
2000	2,353		−8.4%
2010	2,221		−5.6%
2020	2,060		−7.2%
U.S. Decennial Census

=== 2010 census ===
In the census of 2010, there were 2,221 people, 949 households, and 445 families residing in the town. The population density was 160.1 inhabitants per square mile (61.8/km^{2}). There were 1,114 housing units at an average density of 80.3 per square mile (31.0/km^{2}). The racial makeup of the town was 94.7% White, 0.9% African American, 1.0% Native American, 1.2% Asian, 0.2% from other races, and 2.1% from two or more races. Hispanic or Latino of any race were 1.6% of the population.

There were 949 households, of which 22.1% had children under the age of 18 living with them, 31.5% were married couples living together, 11.7% had a female householder with no husband present, 3.7% had a male householder with no wife present, and 53.1% were non-families. 43.2% of all households were made up of individuals, and 19.8% had someone living alone who was 65 years of age or older. The average household size was 2.00 and the average family size was 2.77.

The median age in the town was 37.7 years. 16.4% of residents were under the age of 18; 19.1% were between the ages of 18 and 24; 21.8% were from 25 to 44; 23.3% were from 45 to 64; and 19.4% were 65 years of age or older. The gender makeup of the town was 46.3% male and 53.7% female.

=== 2000 census ===
As of the census of 2000, there were 2,353 people, 939 households, and 503 families residing in the town. The population density was 169.4 inhabitants per square mile (65.4/km^{2}). There were 1,129 housing units at an average density of 81.3 per square mile (31.4/km^{2}). The racial makeup of the town was 95.92% White, 0.64% Black or African American, 0.98% Native American, 1.44% Asian, 0.25% from other races, and 0.76% from two or more races. Hispanic or Latino of any race were 0.55% of the population.

There were 939 households, out of which 24.7% had children under the age of 18 living with them, 38.3% were married couples living together, 11.9% had a female householder with no husband present, and 46.4% were non-families. 37.6% of all households were made up of individuals, and 15.8% had someone living alone who was 65 years of age or older. The average household size was 2.10 and the average family size was 2.75.

In the town, the population was spread out, with 18.9% under the age of 18, 20.4% from 18 to 24, 21.3% from 25 to 44, 20.9% from 45 to 64, and 18.5% who were 65 years of age or older. The median age was 36 years. For every 100 females, there were 87.0 males. For every 100 females age 18 and over, there were 81.9 males.

The median income for a household in the town was $24,318, and the median income for a family was $36,705. Males had a median income of $29,107 versus $21,538 for females. The per capita income for the town was $13,902. About 15.6% of families and 23.5% of the population were below the poverty line, including 24.5% of those under age 18 and 23.6% of those age 65 or over.

== Education ==
The school district is Machias School District.

- Machias Memorial High School
- Rose M. Gaffney Elementary School

Colleges and universities:

- University of Maine at Machias

Private schools:

- Machias Valley Christian School
- Washington Academy is in East Machias

== Notable people ==
- Edward Franklin Albee II, vaudeville impresario
- Col. John Allan (1746–1805), Revolutionary War officer, Canadian politician
- Phineas Bruce (1762–1809), US congressman
- George Donworth (1861–1947), US district judge
- Grace Donworth (1857–1945), writer
- Stephen Clark Foster (1799–1872), US congressman
- Stephen Clark Foster (1820–1898), first American mayor of Los Angeles; born in Machias
- Albert Gallatin (1761–1849), ethnologist, US congressman, treasury secretary
- Samuel Hill (1777–1825), maritime fur trader, sea captain, adventurer
- George Stillman Hillard (1808–1879), Maine state senator, United States attorney
- Mark Lindsay Musician
- Captain Jeremiah O'Brien (1744–1818), naval officer
- Jeremiah O'Brien (1778–1858), US congressman
- Nellie Parker Spaulding, silent film actress
