= Steven Smith =

Steven, Stephen or Steve Smith may refer to:

== Academics ==
- Stephen J Smith (physiologist), American physiologist
- Steven B. Smith (political scientist) (born 1951), American political scientist
- S. A. Smith (born 1952), British historian
- Sir Steve Smith (political scientist) (born 1952), British international relations theorist and university administrator
- Steven S. Smith (born 1953), American political scientist
- Stephen C. Smith (economist) (born 1955), American economist
- Stephen Alexander Smith (1958–2022), Canadian legal scholar
- Stephen Smith (gynaecologist), British gynaecologist and university administrator
- Stephen D. Smith (born 1967), British Holocaust and genocide specialist
- Stephen C. Smith (sociologist) (born 1968), American sociologist
- Steven M. Smith, British plant geneticist

== Art and literature ==
- Stephen Catterson Smith (1806–1872), English-Irish portrait painter
- Steven Ross Smith (born 1945), Canadian poet, writer, journalist and arts activist
- Steven B. Smith (poet) (born 1946), American underground poet, artist, and publisher
- Stephen H. Smith, American sculptor
- Steven C. Smith (author), American biographer

== Military ==
- Stephen Smith (privateer) (1739–1806), American privateer and militia leader
- Stephen R. Smith (1836–1889), adjutant general of the State of Connecticut
- Steven G. Smith (born 1946), United States Navy admiral
- Steve Smith (general) (born 1959), senior officer in the Australian Army Reserve
- Stephen G. Smith (general), U.S. Army general

== Music and performing arts ==
- Steve Smith (American singer) (born 1945), American singer
- Steve Smith (comedian) (born 1945), Canadian comedian, best known for his alter ego Red Green
- W. Stephen Smith (born 1950), American voice teacher
- Steve Smith (drummer) (born 1954), American jazz and rock drummer
- Steve Smith (clown) (born 1951), American clown
- Stephan Said (born 1968), American singer-songwriter and activist, also known as Stephan Smith
- Elliott Smith (Steven Smith, 1969–2003), American musician
- Steven R. Smith (born 1971), American multi-instrumentalist, instrument-builder and initiator of the Hala Strana project
- Steve Smith (British musician) (born 1972), British singer and guitarist

== Politics and government ==
- Stephen Smith (public servant) (1887–1948), New Zealand civil servant, Resident Commissioner in the Cook Islands
- Stephen K. Smith (1894–1981), politician in Newfoundland, Canada
- Stephen Edward Smith (1927–1990), brother-in-law and campaign manager for John F. Kennedy
- Stephen Smith (Whitewater) (born 1949), gubernatorial aide to Bill Clinton
- Steve Smith (Minnesota politician) (1949–2014), American politician and member of the Minnesota House of Representatives
- Stephen J. Smith (politician) (born 1951), American politician and member of the Wisconsin State Assembly
- Stephen Smith (Australian politician) (born 1955), Australian Labor Party politician, minister for defence and member for Perth
- Stephen Stat Smith (born 1955), American politician and member of the Massachusetts House of Representatives
- Steven Wayne Smith (born 1961), Texas Supreme Court justice
- Steven D. Smith (born 1964), member and deputy speaker of the New Hampshire House of Representatives
- Steve Smith (Arizona politician), member of the Arizona House of Representatives
- Stephen Harvey Smith, English judge

== Sports ==
=== Gridiron football ===
- Steve Smith (offensive lineman) (born 1944), offensive tackle & defensive end for Pittsburgh Steelers, Minnesota Vikings & Philadelphia Eagles
- Steve Smith (quarterback) (born 1962), player for the University of Michigan Wolverines, 1980–1983
- Steve Smith (running back) (1964–2021), player for the Los Angeles Raiders and Seattle Seahawks
- Steve Smith (wide receiver, born 1974), arena football offensive specialist
- Steven Smith (American football coach) (born 1976), head football coach at Lincoln University in Missouri
- Steve Smith Sr. (born 1979), wide receiver who played with the Carolina Panthers and Baltimore Ravens
- Steve Smith (defensive back) (born 1979), played at Oregon, drafted by the Jacksonville Jaguars
- Steve Smith (wide receiver, born 1985), former Super Bowl winner with the New York Giants
- Stephen Smith (Canadian football) (born 2002), Canadian football linebacker

=== Association football ===
- Steve Smith (footballer, born 1874) (1874–1935), English international footballer
- Steve Smith (footballer, born 1896) (1896–1980), English footballer
- Steve Smith (footballer, born 1899) (1899–1994), Scottish goalkeeper
- Steve Smith (footballer, born 1946) (1946–2024), English footballer and manager (Huddersfield Town)
- Steve Smith (footballer, born 1957), English footballer (Birmingham City, Bradford City and Crewe Alexandra)
- Steven Smith (footballer, born 1985), Scottish footballer
- Stephen Smith (footballer, born 1986), English footballer

=== Athletics ===
- Steve Smith (pole vaulter) (1951–2020), American pole vaulter
- Steve Smith (American high jumper) (born 1971), American high jumper
- Steve Smith (British high jumper) (born 1973), British high jumper

=== Baseball ===
- Steve Smith (infielder) (born 1952), Cleveland Indians third base coach and former infielder
- Steve Smith (pitcher) (born 1961), American baseball coach and former pitcher

=== Basketball ===
- Steve Smith (basketball coach), American head coach for Oak Hill Academy basketball team
- Steve Smith (basketball, born 1961), American basketball player for Marist
- Stephen A. Smith (born 1967), American sportswriter, NBA analyst, and talk show host
- Steve Smith (basketball) (born 1969), American basketball player and analyst in the NBA
- Stevin Smith (born 1972), American basketball player
- Steven Smith (basketball) (born 1983), American basketball player

=== Cricket ===
- Stephen Smith (cricketer) (1822–1890), English cricketer
- Steve Smith (cricketer, born 1961), Australian, Australian Rebel, and Transvaal cricketer
- Steve Smith (cricketer) (born 1989), Australian international cricketer

=== Ice hockey ===
- Steve Smith (ice hockey, born 1962), Canadian ice hockey player, center for Colgate (NCAA) and NHL scout
- Steve Smith (ice hockey, born April 4, 1963), Canadian ice hockey player, defenceman for the Philadelphia Flyers and the Buffalo Sabres
- Steve Smith (ice hockey, born April 30, 1963), Canadian ice hockey player, defenceman for the Edmonton Oilers, Chicago Blackhawks, and the Calgary Flames

=== Rugby union ===
- Steve Smith (rugby union, born 1951) (born 1951), English rugby union player and British Lion
- Steve Smith (rugby union, born 1959), Irish rugby union player and British Lion
- Steve Smith (rugby union, born 1973) (born 1973), Manu Samoa & North Harbour Rugby Union player from New Zealand
- Stephen Smith (rugby union, born 1934) (1934–2010), English rugby union player

=== Other sports ===
- Steve Smith (pool player) (born 1954), American pool player
- Steven Smith (Australian rules footballer) (born 1956), former Australian rules footballer and current president of the Melbourne Cricket Club
- Steven Smith (equestrian) (born 1962), British equestrian
- Steve Smith (darts player) (born 1979), English darts player
- Stephen Smith (rugby league), Fijian rugby league international
- Stephen Smith (boxer) (born 1985), British boxer
- Steve Smith (cyclist) (1989–2016), Canadian mountain biker

== Other people ==
- Stephen Rensselaer Smith (1788–1850), minister of the early Universalist Church in New York
- Stephen Smith (abolitionist) (1797–1873), Pennsylvanian African American abolitionist
- Stephen Smith (surgeon) (1823–1922), New York physician, public health organizer, and civic leader
- Stephen Francis Smith (1861–1928), Canadian chess master
- Stephen Smith (aerospace engineer) (1891–1951), pioneer of rocket mail in India
- Steven Smith (teamaker) (1949–2015), American tea entrepreneur
- Stephen G. Smith (writer) (born 1949), American journalist, writer and editor
- Stephen J. R. Smith (born 1951), Canadian businessman
- Stephen Smith (journalist) (born 1956), American journalist and writer
- Steven Smith (astronaut) (born 1958), American technology executive and NASA astronaut
- Stephen A. Smith (environmentalist) (born 1962), American clean energy activist
- Stephen Smith (died 2015), American murder victim; see Murdaugh family#Murder of Stephen Smith

== Characters ==
- Steve Smith (American Dad!), in American Dad!

== Other uses ==
- SS Stephen Smith, a Liberty ship

== See also ==
- Stevie Smith (1902–1971), British poet
- Stefan Smith (born 1989), Antiguan footballer
- Steve Schmidt (disambiguation)
