= USS O'Brien =

USS O'Brien has been the name of five ships of the United States Navy, in honor of Jeremiah O'Brien (1744–1818):

- USS O'Brien (TB-30), a torpedo boat, built in 1900 and served until 1909.
- USS O'Brien (DD-51), an O'Brien-class destroyer, which served from 1915 until 1922.
- USS O'Brien (DD-415), a Sims-class destroyer, served from 1940 until she was sunk by an enemy torpedo in 1942.
- USS O'Brien (DD-725), an Allen M. Sumner-class destroyer, served from 1944 until 1972.
- USS O'Brien (DD-975), a Spruance-class destroyer, launched in 1976 and served until 2004.

== See also ==
- SS Jeremiah O'Brien, a Liberty ship, which served during World War II.
