= General Smith =

General Smith may refer to:

== Australia ==
- Andrew Smith (brigadier), Australian Army brigadier general
- Robert Smith (Australian Army officer) (1881–1928), Australian Army brigadier general
- Steve Smith (general) (born 1959), Australian Army Reserve major general
- Stuart Smith (general) (born 1963), Australian Army major general
- Walter Edmond Smith (1895–1976), Australian Army brigadier general

== United Kingdom ==
- Sir Arthur Smith (British Army officer) (1890–1977), British Army lieutenant general
- Clement Leslie Smith (1878–1927), British Army brigadier general
- Edward Smith (British Army officer) (died 1808), British Army general
- Francis Smith (British Army officer) (1723–1791), British Army major general
- Sir Frederick Smith (British Army officer, born 1790) (1790–1874), British Army general
- Greg Smith (British Army officer) (born 1956), British Army major general
- Sir Harry Smith, 1st Baronet (1787–1860), British Army lieutenant general
- James George Smith Neill (1810–1857), British Army brigadier general
- James Webber Smith (1778–1853), British Army lieutenant general
- Sir John Smith (British Army officer, born 1754) (1754–1837), British Army general
- Joseph Smith (East India Company officer) (1732/3–1790), British East India Company general
- Joshua Simmons Smith, British Army general
- Sir Lionel Smith, 1st Baronet (1778–1842), British Army lieutenant general
- Martin Smith (Royal Marines officer) (born 1962), Royal Marines major general
- Michael William Smith, British Army general
- Philip Smith (British Army officer) (–died 1894), British Army lieutenant general
- Richard Smith (East India Company officer) (1734–1803), British East India Company brigadier general
- Sir Rupert Smith (born 1943), British Army general
- Wilfrid Smith (British Army officer) (1867–1942), British Army major general
- Sir William Douglas Smith (1865–1939), British Army major general

== United States ==
- Albert C. Smith (general) (1894–1974), U.S. Army major general
- Alfred T. Smith (1874–1939), U.S. Army brigadier general
- Andrew Jackson Smith (1815–1897), Union Army major general
- C. R. Smith (1899–1990), U.S. Air Force major general
- Charles Bradford Smith (1916–2004), U.S. Army brigadier general
- Charles Ferguson Smith (1807–1862), Union Army major general
- David R. Smith (general) (1941–), U.S. Air Force major general
- Dirk D. Smith (fl. 1980s–2010s)), U.S. Air Force major general
- Donald B. Smith (born 1947), U.S. Army brigadier general
- Edmund Kirby Smith (1824–1893), U.S. Army general
- Edwin P. Smith (born 1945), U.S. Army lieutenant general
- Eric Smith (general) (fl. 1980s–2020s), U.S. Army major general
- Eric Smith (general), (born 1964 or 1965) U.S. Marine Corps general and Marine Corps Commandant
- Frederick Appleton Smith (1849–1922), U.S. Army brigadier general
- Frederic H. Smith Jr. (1908–1980), U.S. Air Force general
- Giles Alexander Smith (1829–1876), Union Army major general
- George R. Smith (Paymaster-General) (1850–1928), U.S. Army Paymaster-General
- George W. Smith (USMC) (1925–2014), U.S. Marine Corps major general
- George W. Smith Jr. (1990s–2020s), U.S. Marine Corps lieutenant general
- Green Clay Smith (1826–1895), Union Army brigadier general
- Holland Smith (1882–1967), U.S. Marine Corps general
- Homer D. Smith (1922–2011), U.S. Army major general
- Isaac D. Smith (born 1932), U.S. Army major general
- Jacob H. Smith (1840–1918), U.S. Army general
- James Smith (Texas General) (1792–1855), Texas Revolutionary Army general
- James Francis Smith (1859–1928), U.S. Army brigadier general
- Jeffrey G. Smith (1921–2021), U.S. Army lieutenant general
- John E. Smith (general) (1816–1897), Union Army brigadier general
- Joseph Smith (general) (1901–1993), U.S. Air Force lieutenant general
- Julian C. Smith (1885–1975), U.S. Marine Corps lieutenant general
- Keith Smith (general) (1928–2012), U.S. Marine Corps lieutenant general
- Lance L. Smith (born 1946), U.S. Air Force general
- Leo W. Smith II (born 1936), U.S. Air Force lieutenant general
- Leslie C. Smith (fl. 1980s–2020s), U.S. Army lieutenant general
- Morgan Lewis Smith (1822–1874), Union Army brigadier general
- Norman H. Smith (born 1933), U.S. Marine Corps lieutenant general
- Oliver P. Smith (1893–1977), U.S. Marine Corps general
- Paul F. Smith (1915–2014), U.S. Army major general
- Perry G. Smith Sr. (born 1949), Alabama National Guard major general
- Perry M. Smith (born 1934), U.S. Air Force major general
- Persifor Frazer Smith (1798–1858), U.S. Army brigadier general
- Phillips Waller Smith (1906–1963), U.S. Air Force major general
- Ralph C. Smith (1893–1998), U.S. Army major general
- Ray L. Smith, U.S. Marine Corps major general
- Stephen G. Smith (general) (fl. 1990s–2020s), U.S. Army major general
- Tammy Smith (1963–), U.S. Army brigadier general
- Thomas Adams Smith (1781–1844), U.S. Army brigadier general
- Thomas C. H. Smith (1819–1897), Union Army brigadier general
- Thomas Kilby Smith (1820–1887), Union Army brigadier general
- Walter Smith (American football) (1875–1955), U.S. Army brigadier general
- Walter Bedell Smith (1895–1961), U.S. Army general
- Wayne C. Smith (1901–1964), U.S. Army major general
- William Smith (Paymaster general) (1831–1912), U.S. Army brigadier general
- William Farrar Smith (1824–1903), Union Army major general
- William Ruthven Smith (1868–1941), U.S. Army major general
- William Sooy Smith (1830–1916), Union Army major general
- William Y. Smith (1925–2016), U.S. Air Force general

=== U.S. state militias ===
- Daniel Smith (surveyor) (1748–1818), Tennessee Militia brigadier general
- Francis Henney Smith (1812–1890), Virginia Militia major general
- Heman R. Smith (1795–1861), Vermont Militia major general
- Jesse C. Smith (1808–1888), New York Militia brigadier general
- Joseph Smith (1805–1844), Illinois Militia lieutenant general
- Samuel Smith (Maryland politician) (1752–1839), Maryland Militia major general

=== Confederate States Army ===
- Gustavus Woodson Smith (1821–1896), major general
- James Argyle Smith (1831–1901), brigadier general
- Martin Luther Smith (1819–1866), major general
- Melancthon Smith (Confederate officer) (1829–1881), Mississippi Militia major general
- Preston Smith (general) (1823–1863), brigadier general
- Thomas Benton Smith (1838–1923), brigadier general
- William Smith (Virginia governor) (1797–1887), major general
- William Duncan Smith (1825–1862), brigadier general

== Other countries ==
- Brian L. Smith (born 1939), Canadian Air Force lieutenant general
- Carlos Smith (Argentine officer) (1845–1913), Argentine Army general
- Desmond Smith (Canadian Army officer) (1911–1991), Canadian Army general
- Joseph Henry Smith (born 1945), Ghana Army lieutenant general
- Lawrence Smith (South Africa), South African Army major general

== See also ==
- William Aird-Smith (1993–1942), British Army brigadier general
- Edward Percival Allman-Smith (1886–1969), British Army brigadier general
- Sir Horace Smith-Dorrien (1858–1930), British Army general
- Merton Beckwith-Smith (1890–1942), British Army major general
- Mark Carleton-Smith (born 1964), British Army general
- Sir Anthony Denison-Smith (born 1942), British Army lieutenant general
- Eric Dorman-Smith (1895–1969), Irish Republican Army Acting major general
- Sir Edmund Hakewill-Smith (1896–1986), British Army major general
- Len Roberts-Smith (born 1945), Australian Army Reserve major general
- Artur Schmitt (1888–1972), German Army lieutenant general
- Maurice Schmitt (born 1930), French Army general
- Admiral Smith (disambiguation)
- Attorney General Smith (disambiguation)
- General Smyth (disambiguation)
- Smith (surname), a family name (surname) originating in England
