= Admiral Smith =

Admiral Smith may refer to:

== Australia ==
- Geoffrey Smith (admiral) (born 1950), Royal Australian Navy rear admiral
- Victor Smith (1913–1998), Royal Australian Navy admiral

== United Kingdom ==
- Aubrey Smith (Royal Navy officer) (1872–1957), British Royal Navy admiral
- Conolly Abel Smith (1899–1985), British Royal Navy vice admiral
- Isaac Smith (Royal Navy officer) (1752–1831), British Royal Navy rear admiral
- Jeremiah Smith (Royal Navy officer) (died 1675), British Royal Navy admiral
- Sidney Smith (Royal Navy officer) (1764–1840), British Royal Navy admiral
- Thomas Smith (Royal Navy officer, died 1762) (1707–1762), British Royal Navy admiral
- William Smith (Royal Navy officer) (died 1756), British Royal Navy rear admiral

== United States ==
- Edward H. Smith (sailor) (1889–1961), U.S. Coast Guard admiral
- F. Neale Smith (1930–2020), U.S. Navy rear admiral
- Harold Page Smith (1904–1993), U.S. Navy four-star admiral
- James Thomas Smith (1908–1980), U.S. Navy rear admiral
- Joseph Smith (admiral) (1790–1877), U.S. Navy rear admiral
- Leighton W. Smith Jr. (born 1939), U.S. Navy admiral
- Levering Smith (1910–1993), U.S. Navy vice admiral
- Raymond C. Smith (1943–2022), U.S. Navy rear admiral
- Shepard M. Smith (fl. 1990s–2020s), U.S. Navy rear admiral
- Steven G. Smith (born 1946), U.S. Navy rear admiral
- Willard J. Smith (1910–2000), U.S. Coast Guard admiral
- William D. Smith (admiral) (1933–2020), U.S. Navy admiral
- William W. Smith (admiral) (1888–1966), U.S. Navy vice admiral

== See also ==
- William Henry Smyth (1788–1865), British Royal Navy admiral
- Nathaniel Bowden-Smith (1838–1921), British Royal Navy admiral
- General Smith (disambiguation)
