= Stephen Smyth =

Stephen Smyth may refer to:

- Stephen Smyth (cricketer)
- Stephen Smyth (Marist Brother)
- Stephen Smyth (rugby union)

== See also ==
- Steve Smyth, American musician
- Steve Smyth (baseball), American baseball pitcher
- Stephen Smith (disambiguation)
