= Steve Schmidt (disambiguation) =

Steve Schmidt, Stephen Schmidt, or Steven Schmidt could refer to:

- Steve Schmidt (born 1970), American political consultant
- Steven Schmidt, American environmental activist
- Steve Schmidt (Canadian football) (born 1984)
- Steve Schmidt (New Hampshire politician)
- Stephen Schmidt, author of 1987 cookbook Master Recipes

== See also ==
- Steven Smith (disambiguation)
