= USS English =

Allen M. Sumner-class destroyer

Coordinates: 27°06′N 127°38′E

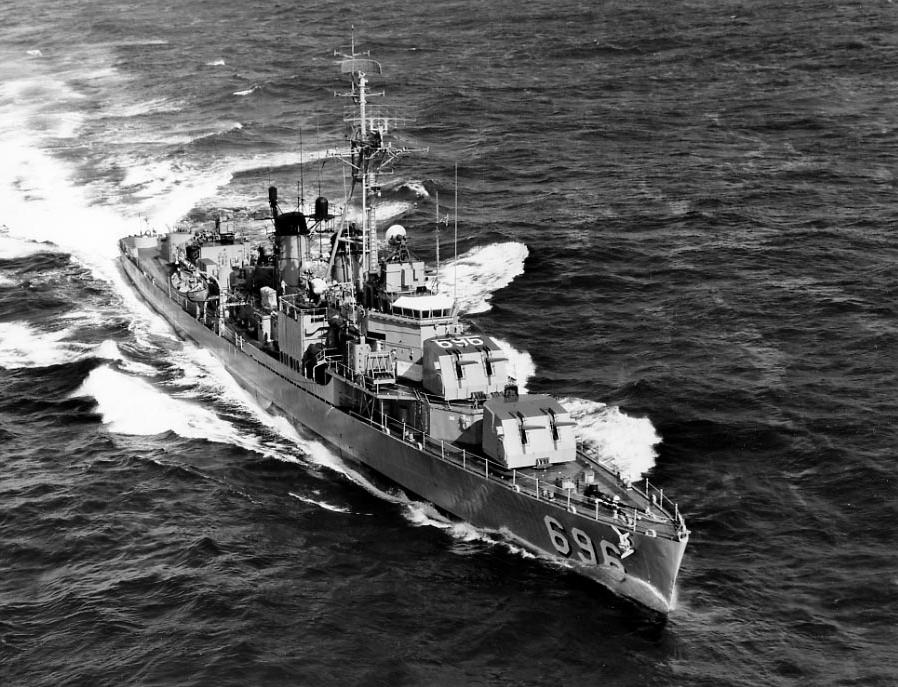
- USS English underway in October 1962.

History

United States
- Name: English
- Namesake: Robert Henry English
- Builder: Federal Shipbuilding and Drydock Company
- Laid down: 19 October 1943
- Launched: 27 February 1944
- Sponsored by: Mrs. Eloise W English
- Commissioned: 4 May 1944
- Decommissioned: 15 May 1970
- Stricken: 15 May 1970
- Identification: Callsign: NHEE; Hull number: DD-696
- Honours and awards: See Awards
- Fate: Transferred to Taiwan, 11 August 1970
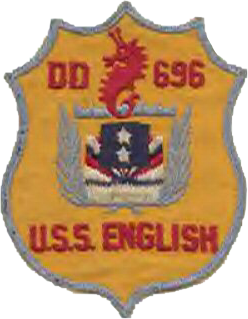
- Badge

Taiwan
- Name: Hui Yang; (惠陽)
- Namesake: Hui Yang
- Acquired: 11 August 1970
- Commissioned: 14 February 1971
- Identification: Hull number: DD-6
- Decommissioned: 16 August 1999
- Reclassified: DD-972, 1980; DDG-906, mid-1980s
- Fate: Sunk as target, 14 October 2003

General characteristics
- Class & type: Allen M. Sumner-class destroyer
- Displacement: 2,200 tons
- Length: 376 ft 6 in (114.76 m)
- Beam: 40 ft (12 m)
- Draft: 15 ft 8 in (4.78 m)
- Propulsion: 60,000 shp (45,000 kW); 2 propellers
- Speed: 34 knots (63 km/h; 39 mph)
- Range: 6,500 nautical miles (12,000 km; 7,500 mi) at 15 knots (28 km/h; 17 mph)
- Complement: 336
- Armament: 6 × 5-inch 38 caliber, 12 × 40 mm AA guns, 11 × 20 mm AA guns, 10 × 21 inch (533 mm) torpedo tubes, 6 × depth charge projectors, 2 × depth charge tracks

USS English (DD-696) was an Allen M. Sumner-class destroyer. She was named for Rear Admiral Robert Henry English, a submariner who commanded the light cruiser Helena and had been awarded the Navy Cross and the Navy Distinguished Service Medal. English died in the crash of Pan Am Flight 1104 on 21 January 1943.

USS English saw combat in World War II and the Korean War and later participated in the Cuban Missile Crisis during the Cold War. She was transferred to the Republic of China Navy in 1970 and renamed Huei Yang, serving until she was decommissioned in 1999. She was sunk as a target in 2003.

== Construction and career ==
English was launched on 27 February 1944 by Federal Shipbuilding and Drydock Co. at Kearny, New Jersey. She was sponsored by English's daughter, Ensign Eloise W English, USNR(W) and commissioned on 4 May 1944 by James Thomas Smith.

=== Service in the United States Navy ===
English arrived in the Hawaiian Islands on 3 September 1944 for final training and service as plane guard during the qualification of aviators in carrier operations. On 17 December, she sailed from Pearl Harbor for Ulithi, where on 28 December she joined the screen for the aircraft carriers of Task Force 38 (TF) 38. She put to sea on 30 December for airstrikes to neutralize Japanese bases on Formosa, Luzon, Okinawa, and the coast of Japanese-occupied French Indochina in support of the invasion of Lingayen Gulf. On 12 January 1945, she mistook the U.S. Navy submarine USS Rock (SS-274) for a Japanese sailboat while Rock was on the surface in the South China Sea off French Indochina and opened gunfire on her at a range of 9,200 yards (8,400 m). Rock crash-dived to 300 feet (91 m) and sustained no damage.

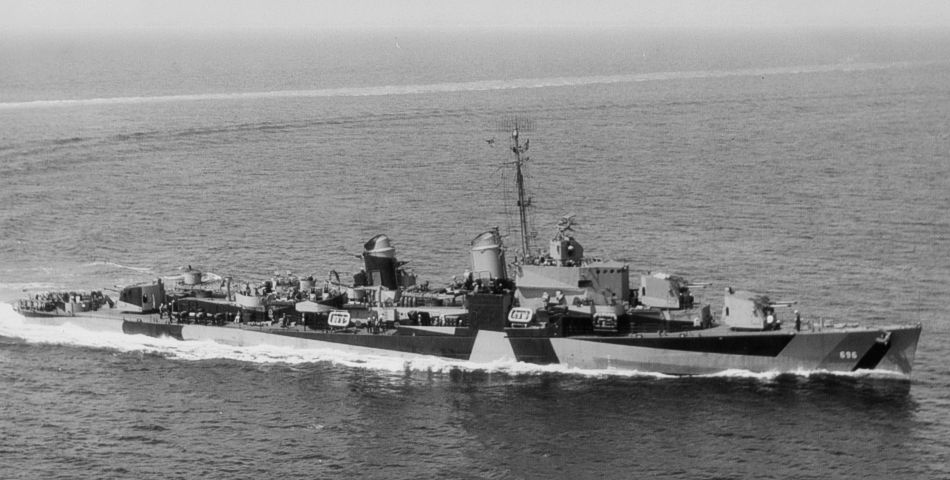
English underway in the 1940s

English returned to Ulithi to replenish between 26 January 1945 and 8 February, then sailed to Saipan to meet the cruiser Indianapolis and escort her to a rendezvous with newly designated TF 58. She screened the carriers as they launched airstrikes accompanying the Iwo Jima operation, hitting Tokyo before and after the assault on Iwo Jima and Okinawa.

After taking on fuel and stores at Ulithi from 4 March 1945 to 14 March, English sortied with TF 58 for strikes on Kyushu heralding the Okinawa operation. When Franklin was damaged by bombing on 19 March off Kyushu, English screened the carrier's retirement from the area, then rejoined the screen for strikes on Okinawa and nearby islands in the days preceding the assault. On 1 April, she closed Okinawa to provide Naval gunfire support for the invading troops, returning to the carrier screen for strikes against shore targets and shipping. She left the task force to bombard Minami Daito Shima on the night of 10 May. The next day, English went close alongside Bunker Hill, damaged by a kamikaze, to help fight fires and to evacuate Vice Admiral Marc Mitscher and his staff, who she transferred to another carrier.

English put into San Pedro Bay, Philippines, from 1 June to 1 July for repairs and exercises, then sailed again with TF 38 for the final series of airstrikes on the Japanese homeland. She closed the coast of Honshū on 18 July to search for Japanese shipping in Sagami Wan and shell targets on Nojima Saki.

==== Post-World War II ====
In Tokyo Bay from 10 to 19 September, English voyaged to escort occupation shipping from the Marianas, then after 2 months of occupation duty cleared Sasebo passage to Boston, Massachusetts where she arrived 26 April 1946.

English operated out of Boston, later Charleston and New Orleans, for exercises and to train members of the Naval Reserve, cruising along the east coast and the Caribbean. From 23 April 1949, she was home ported at Norfolk, Massachusetts, from which she sailed 6 September for her first tour of duty with the 6th Fleet in the Mediterranean. She returned to Norfolk on 26 January 1950 for exercises off the Virginia Capes and the Caribbean.

==== Korean War ====
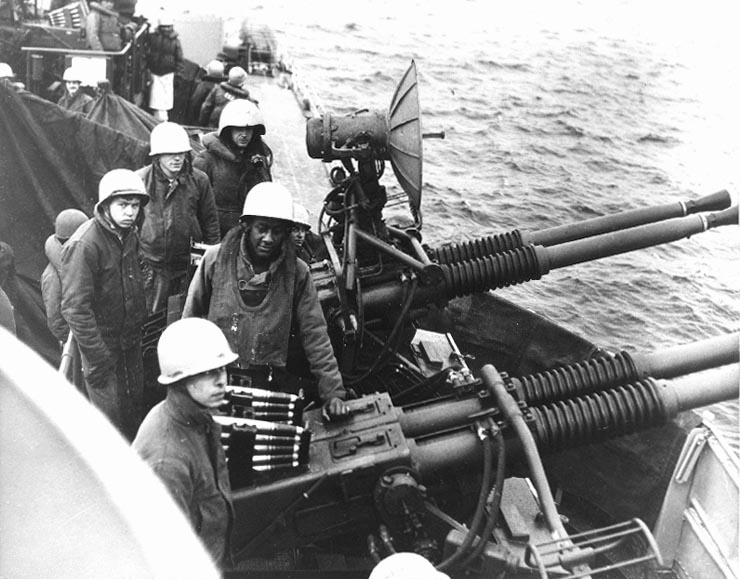
40 mm gun crew aboard the English prepares to bombard enemy installations along the Korean coast, circa October 1950 - February 1951

Alerted for distant deployment upon the outbreak of the Korean War, English departed Norfolk 6 September 1950 for the Panama Canal, San Diego, Pearl Harbor, Midway and Yokosuka, where she arrived 5 October. She supported the withdrawal from Hungnam, then proceeded with two corvettes of the Royal Thai Navy to shell Communist positions at Choderi and Chongjin. On 7 January 1951, one of the corvettes, HMTS Prase, was grounded in a heavy snowstorm. After unsuccessful attempts to salvage her, English destroyed the corvette with gunfire.

On 20 January 1951 English began duty as the direct fire-support ship for a division of the Korean army, shelling positions at Kanson, Kosong and Kangnung, supporting the Korean advance. She served on blockade at Chongjin and Wonsan, and in 20 consecutive days on the firing line she helped disrupt attacks by Communist shore batteries. After a final period of service screening carriers on both coasts of Korea, she sailed from Yokosuka on 11 May eastbound for Norfolk.

From her return to Norfolk on 9 June 1951, English resumed local training operations and in the winter of 1952 joined in cold-weather exercises off Newfoundland and Nova Scotia. On 26 August 1952 she departed for North Atlantic Treaty Organization (NATO) operations in which she visited Britain and a tour of duty in the Mediterranean, returning to Norfolk 5 February 1953. In the fall of 1954 she visited Lisbon, Portugal. On 31 October 1954, while at sea for a major fleet exercise, she collided with the destroyer Wallace L. Lind, lost 50 feet (15 m) of her bow but suffered no casualties, sailing into port under her own power and was repaired by early in 1955.

==== Suez Crisis ====
From May to August 1955, English made a goodwill cruise to ports of northern Europe and between 28 July 1956 and 4 December 1956 served again in the Mediterranean, visiting Bahrain in the Persian Gulf. During the Suez Crisis in October–November 1956, she aided in evacuating American citizens from the area and patrolled the eastern Mediterranean to serve with the Sixth Fleet. Returning to Norfolk in April she spent the remainder of 1959 and all of 1960 in conducting an intensive program of antisubmarine warfare exercises.

English sailed for the Mediterranean and the Sixth Fleet in September 1961, calling at Naples, Livorno and La Spezia, Italy; Barcelona, Spain; and Toulon, France.

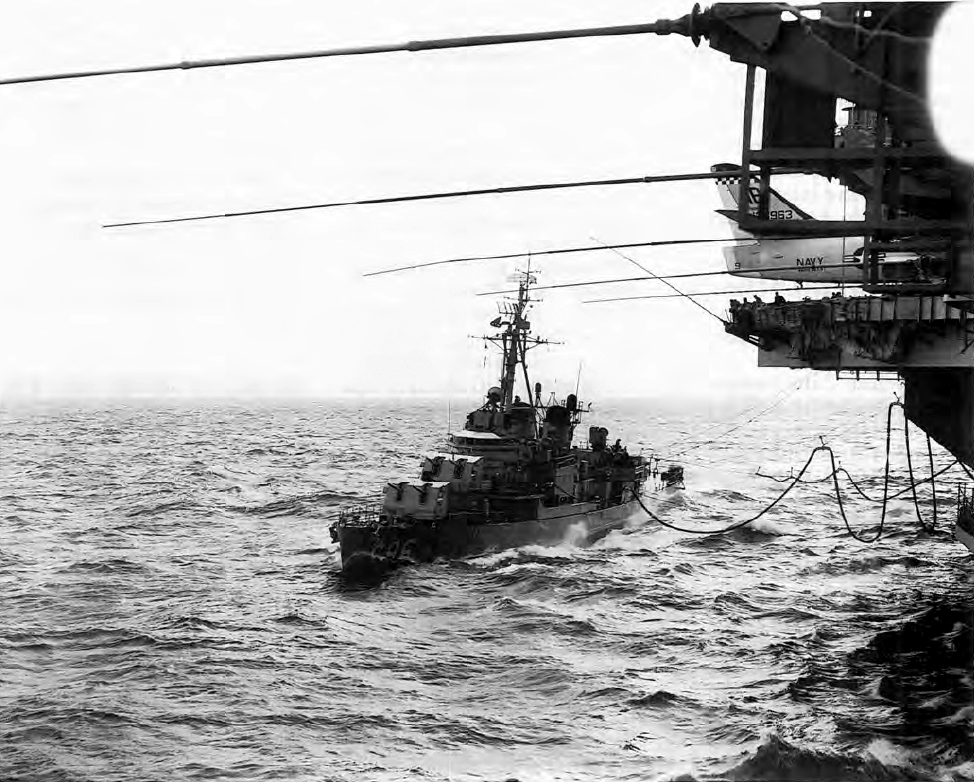
English refuels from USS Independence during the Cuban Missile Crisis, in October 1962

==== Cuban Missile Crisis ====
In October 1962, English served duty during the Cuban Missile Crisis, primarily acting as plane guard for the aircraft carriers Independence and Enterprise, operating for over 30 days, without replenishment.

The English also served as a Reserve Training ship in the late '60s in Mayport, Florida.

==== Decommissioning ====
English was decommissioned and stricken from the Navy List on 15 May 1970.

=== Service in the Republic of China Navy ===
On 11 August 1970, English was transferred to the Republic of China and commissioned on 14 February 1971. She served in the Republic of China Navy as ROCS Hui Yang (DD-6).

During 1980, her number was changed to DD-972.

In 1984, the Ship participated in the Han Kuang II exercise and served as the flagship of the firepower display. The Lo Yang, Nan Yang and Kwei Yang too participated in the exercise and made hits on a target ship, and then launched the white phosphorus more accurately and hit the designated target on Gupo Island in Penghu. In mid-1980s, her number was again changed to DDG-906.

On 1 September 1988, Hui Yang was training in the open sea of Zuoying, and her shells on board the ship jammed. She was advised not enter the Zuoying Naval Base as her jammed shells pose a danger to the dangerous goods but she did moored in the base despite the warning. On the next day, 2 September, there was a non-commissioned officer whom fired her gun by mistake, and the shell directly penetrated the bridge of the destroyer Shao Yang, killing two non-commissioned officers on the spot. The shells finally landed in the storage room of a family member's village. After these two deaths, the weapon commander, gunners, and sergeants of the ship were sent to court martial, and an award from Colonel Lei Guangshu was also stripped.

In 1991, the ship was modernized under the Wu-Chin I programme, with one 5-inch gun mount replaced by an OTO Melara 76 mm rapid-fire gun, while adding five Hsiung Feng I anti-ship missiles and a quadruple Sea Chaparral surface-to-air missile launcher.

She served until she was decommissioned on 16 August 1999.

The Republic of China Navy expended Huei Yang as a target on 14 October 2003, off Hualien.

== Awards ==
English received four battle stars for World War II service and four for Korean war service.
