= Stephen Smith (privateer) =

Captain Stephen Smith (1739 – 29 September 1806) was an American privateer and militia officer from Machias, Maine who fought in the raid on Saint John. The following year Smith was appointed truck master to the Native Americans to ensure their support during the American Revolution. He also participated in the Battle of Machias (1777). (Note: the record does not support that Smith was on the Unity, the ship Jeremiah O'Brien used to capture the Margaretta at the Battle of Machias.) Smith, after the revolution was appointed by President George Washington under Treasury Secretary Alexander Hamilton in Machias as a Tax Collector.
