= Raid on Saint John =

- Part of the American Revolutionary War
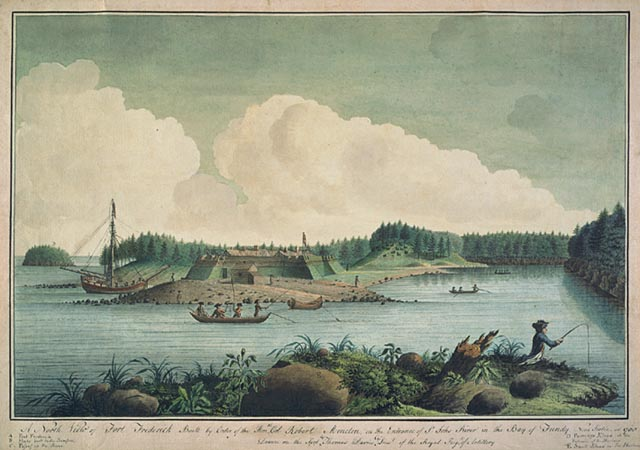
- Fort Frederick (Saint John, New Brunswick)
Date	27 August 1775
Location	Saint John, New Brunswick
Result	American victory

Belligerents
United Colonies	Great Britain

Commanders and leaders
Stephen Smith	Frederick Sterling

The raid on Saint John took place on 27 August 1775 during the American Revolutionary War. The raid involved American privateers from Machias, Maine attacking Saint John, Nova Scotia on the northeast shore of the Bay of Fundy (in present day New Brunswick) Saint John and the rest of New Brunswick would later split from Nova Scotia. The privateers intended to stop the export of supplies being sent to the loyalists in Boston. This raid was the first hostile act committed against Nova Scotia and it resulted in raising the militia across the colony.

== Background ==
During the American Revolutionary War, Americans regularly attacked Nova Scotia, the coasts of modern day Nova Scotia and New Brunswick by sea and land. American privateers devastated these small maritime economies by raiding many of the coastal communities, such as the numerous raids on Liverpool and on Annapolis Royal.

Barely a month after the battles of Lexington and Concord, there was a great naval success by 30 American militia in the sloop Success on 14 May 1775 who recaptured two ships and their Royal Navy crews, totaling 15, on Buzzards Bay at the Battle off Fairhaven. These vessels had previously been taken by HMS Falcon. A month later, 55 American militia, led by Jeremiah O'Brien took control of two merchant vessels and on 12 June, used them to captured the armed coastal patrol sloop (sometimes called a schooner, sometimes a frigate), HMS Margaretta and her crew of 40 at the Battle of Machias, 12 miles (19 km) down the bay off Machiasport.

In response to this defeat, in July 1775 the British sent two armed sloops, HMS Diligence and HMS Tatamagouche from Halifax to intercept the American attackers. However, O'Brien and his fellow captain, Benjamin Foster, captured both vessels in Unity and Portland Packet (aka the Falmouth Packet) in the Bay of Fundy.

In August, the Machias Committee of Safety sent Captain Stephen Smith to capture the brig Loyal Briton at St. John, which was loading cattle and other supplies intended for the British army at Boston.

== Battle ==
On 27 August 1775, Captain Stephen Smith, in a 4-gun American privateer from Machias, along with 40 militia men raided Saint John and burned Fort Frederick and took the brig Loyal Briton under the command of Captain Frederick Sterling. The brig had 120 tonnes of sheep and oxen for the British forces in Boston. Sterling also took a corporal and two privates, with two women and five children prisoner. John Anderson Esq. was also on board the brig. The brigantine was owned by John Sempill (Semple) and the navigator was David Ross, who both escaped. The prisoners were released at Boston and sent back to Saint John.

== Aftermath ==
Captain Edward Le Cras of HMS Somerset and HMS Tartar proceeded immediately to Annapolis Royal to protect the town on the southeast shore of the Bay of Fundy. The Governor requested two sloops-of-war to patrol the Bay of Fundy. Admiral Samuel Graves assigned Captain William Duddingston of HMS Senegal to the task. Graves also sent Le Cras to protect Halifax for the winter. Governor Legge of Nova Scotia also called up militias from across the colony to be stood up.

In retaliation for the raid on Saint John, the British executed the burning of Falmouth, modern day Portland, Maine. American privateers remained a threat to Nova Scotian ports for the rest of the war.

== See also ==
- American Revolution – Nova Scotia theatre
- Military history of Nova Scotia
