= James Thomas Smith =

United States Navy Rear Admiral

- Born: November 1, 1908; Howell, Tennessee
- Died: June 28, 1990 (aged 81); Alpine, California
- Burial place: Fort Rosecrans National Cemetery
- Military career
- Allegiance: United States
- Branch: United States Navy
- Service years: 1931–1958
- Rank: Rear Admiral
- Commands: USS Mahan (DD-364); USS English (DD-696); USS Menifee (APA-202)
- Conflicts: World War II; Korean War

Rear Admiral James Thomas Smith (November 1, 1908 – June 28, 1990) was an officer of the United States Navy during World War II.

== Early years ==
Smith was born in Howell, Tennessee, to James Hillary Brewer and Mary Elizabeth (Pickle) Smith. Following graduation from Lincoln County High School and a year at Bryson Junior College, he entered the United States Naval Academy in 1927, graduating in the class of 1931. He married Margaret Elizabeth (Peggy) Glasgow of Long Beach, California, in August 1932.

== Pre war years ==
After a successful solo at the end of elimination flight training at NAS North Island in San Diego Bay, Smith's first assignment afloat was in the battleship Texas (BB-35), and between 1933 and 1938 he had consecutive duty in the destroyers Roper (DD-147), Rathburne (DD-113), Aaron Ward (DD-132), Pillsbury (DD-227) (on the China Station), and Herbert (DD-160). He next had instruction in general line at the Naval Postgraduate School in Annapolis, Maryland, and in September 1939 joined the destroyer Breckinridge (DD-148) as executive officer.

== World War II ==
Transferred to the Dewey (DD-349) in February 1941, he was serving as Engineering Officer of that destroyer, based at Pearl Harbor, when the Japanese attacked the Naval Base there on December 7, 1941. Throughout the most part of World War II, he had duty in destroyers, serving as Executive and Commanding Officer of the Mahan (DD-364) (May 1942-December 1943) and in command of the English (DD-696) (May 1944-April 1945), which he commissioned. During the war in the Pacific he participated in action off Bougainville Island, the Battle of the Coral Sea, attack and occupation of Salamaua-Lae, and in action at Finschhafen, Araw, Manila, Hong Kong, Saigon, Formosa, Okinawa, Tokyo, and Iwo Jima. For his outstanding service during the war he was awarded the Silver Star, the Bronze Star with Combat "V", the Purple Heart, and a Letter of Commendation with Ribbon.

== Post war years ==
In May 1945 Smith was assigned to Reserve Officer Promotions in the Bureau of Naval Personnel, Navy Department, and for a year, June 1947-May 1948, was a student (Senior Course) at the Naval War College, Newport, Rhode Island. After an assignment on the staff of the Commander First Fleet, he reported in June 1950 as Executive Officer of the Department of Marine Engineering at the Naval Academy. From July 1952 until September 1953 he commanded the attack transport Menifee (APA-202), operating in the Korean area during the hostilities there, and during August and September 1953 served additionally as Senior Officer Present Afloat at Inchon, Korea. He was head of the Joint and Combined Operation Section, Amphibious Warfare Branch, Office of the Chief of Naval Operations, Navy Department in 1953 and 1954, after which he was in command of the Naval Receiving Station, San Diego, California. From November 1957 to retirement in January 1958 he was Assistant Chief of Staff for Administration to the Commandant of the Fourteenth Naval District with headquarters in Pearl Harbor, Hawaii.

== Retirement ==
Upon retirement, Admiral Smith traveled, worked at Idyllwild School of Music and the Arts, pursued hobbies such as leatherwork and photography, and played golf. He eventually settled in Alpine, California, near San Diego where he died in 1990. He and his wife Peggy, who died in 1995, are buried at Fort Rosecrans National Cemetery in San Diego.
