= General Smyth =

General Smyth may refer to:

- Alexander Smyth (1765–1830), U.S. Army brigadier general in the War of 1812
- Edward Selby Smyth (1819–1896), British Canadian Militia general
- George Stracey Smyth (1767–1823), Norfolk Militia major general
- Henry Smyth (British Army officer, born 1816) (1816–1891), British Army general
- Henry Augustus Smyth (1825–1906), British Army general
- John Rowland Smyth (1803–1873), British Army lieutenant general
- Leicester Smyth (1829–1891), British Army lieutenant general
- Nevill Smyth (1868–1941), British Army major general
- Thomas Alfred Smyth (1832–1865), Union Army brigadier general
- Sir John Smyth, 1st Baronet (1893–1983), British Indian Army brigadier general
- Sir Thomas Smyth, 2nd Baronet (after 1657–1732), British Army brigadier general

== See also ==
- William James Smythe (1816–1887) Royal Artillery general and colonel-commandant
- Edward Smyth-Osbourne (born 1964), British Army lieutenant general
- Sir James Carmichael-Smyth, 1st Baronet (1779–1838), British Army major general
- General Smith (disambiguation)
