= Attorney General Smith =

Attorney General Smith or Attorney-General Smith may refer to:

- A. Hyatt Smith (1814–1892), Attorney General of the Wisconsin Territory
- Albert James Smith (1822–1883), Attorney General of Canada (Acting)
- Brian Smith (Canadian politician) (born 1934), Attorney General of British Columbia
- Bud Smith (politician) (born 1946), Attorney General of British Columbia
- Darrell F. Smith (1927–2013), Attorney General of Arizona
- F. E. Smith, 1st Earl of Birkenhead (1872–1930), Attorney General for England and Wales
- Francis Smith (Australian politician) (1819–1909), Attorney General of Tasmania
- Frederick Smith (barrister) (1924–2016), Attorney-General of Barbados
- Frederick Smith (lawyer) (1773–1830), Attorney General of Pennsylvania
- George Baldwin Smith (1823–1879), Attorney General of Wisconsin
- George Paton Smith (1829–1877), Attorney-General of Victoria, Australia
- Godfrey Smith (politician) (fl. 1980s–2000s), Attorney-General of Belize
- Greg Smith (New South Wales politician) (born 1947), Attorney General of New South Wales
- James C. Smith (politician) (born 1940), Attorney General of Florida
- John Smith Walker (1826–1893), interim Attorney General of the Kingdom of Hawaii
- Lyndon A. Smith (1854–1918), Attorney General of Minnesota
- Thomas Cusack-Smith (1795–1866), Attorney-General for Ireland
- William French Smith (1917–1990), Attorney General of the United States
- William Owen Smith (1848–1929), Attorney General of the Provisional Government of Hawaii, and of the Republic of Hawaii
- William Rudolph Smith (1787–1868), Attorney General of Wisconsin
- William Smith (judge, born 1697) (1697–1769), Attorney General of New York
- Winfield Smith (1827–1899), Attorney General of Wisconsin

== See also ==
- John Lucie-Smith (1825–1883), Attorney General of British Guiana
- William Haynes-Smith (1839–1928), Attorney General of British Guiana
- Smith McPherson (1848–1915), Attorney General of Iowa
- Constantine Joseph Smyth (1859–1924), Attorney General of Nebraska
- General Smith (disambiguation)
