= Stephen Harvey Smith =

British immigration Judge

Stephen Harvey Smith is a salaried judge of the United Kingdom's Upper Tribunal, Immigration and Asylum Chamber. He was called to the bar by Lincoln's Inn in 2003. In 2018, he was appointed as a salaried judge of the First-tier Tribunal, Immigration and Asylum Chamber and was also appointed as a recorder. One year later, he was appointed an Upper Tribunal Judge.
