= Joseph Smith (general) =

United States Air Force general (1901–1993)

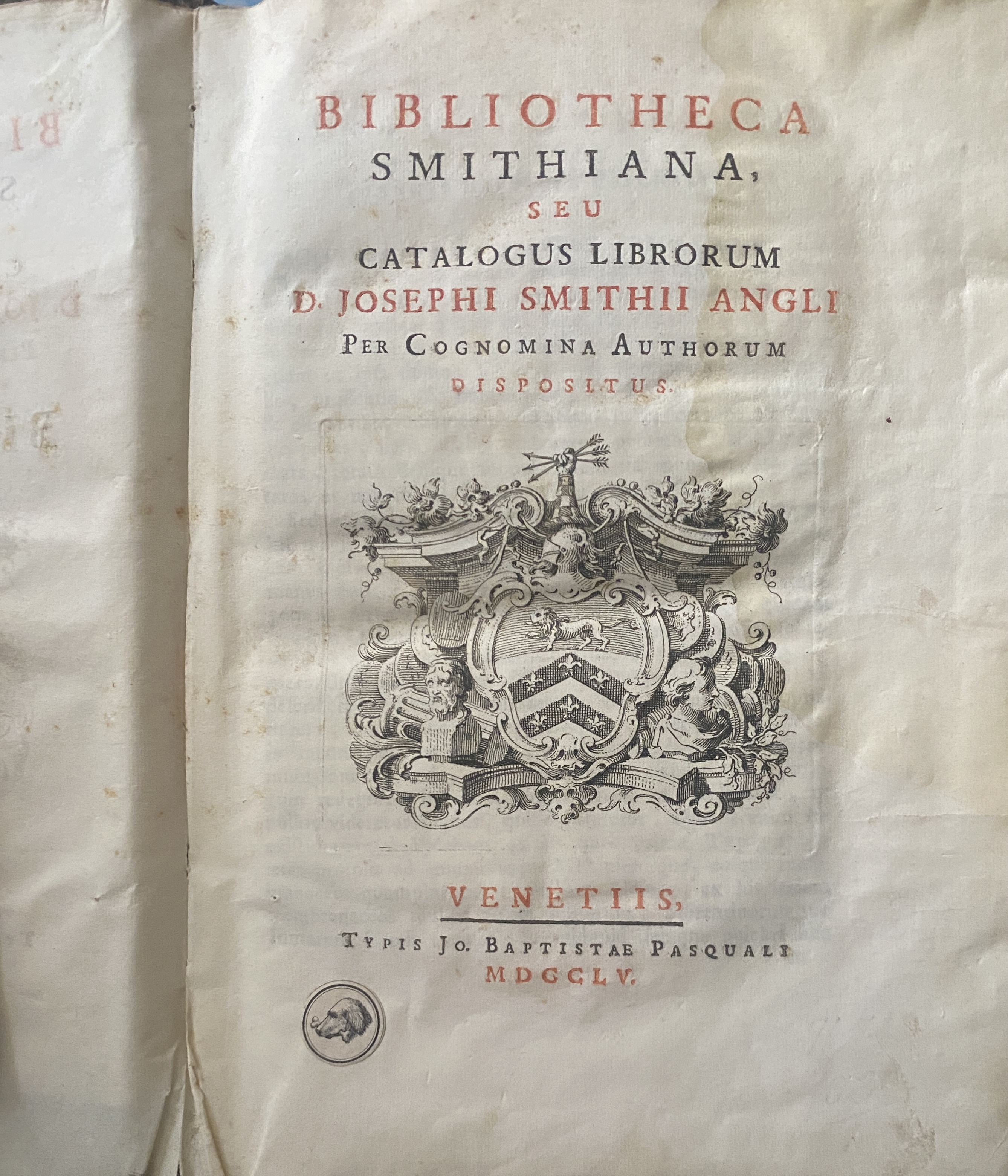
- Born: 31 October 1901; Scranton, Pennsylvania, U.S.
- Died: 19 May 1993 (aged 91); Andrews Air Force Base Hospital, Maryland, U.S.
- Burial place: Arlington National Cemetery, U.S.
- Military career
- Allegiance: United States
- Branch: Cavalry (1923–1929); Air Corps (1929–1947); United States Air Force (1947–1958)
- Service years: 1923–1958
- Rank: Lieutenant General
- Commands: Military Air Transport Service; Air Tactical School; XX Bomber Command
- Conflicts: World War II; China-Burma-India Theater; Bombing of Japan; Korean War
- Awards: Legion of Merit (2); Army Distinguished Service Medal (2); Bronze Star Medal; Medal for Humane Action

Joseph Smith (31 October 1901 – 19 May 1993) was a United States Air Force lieutenant general. He graduated from the United States Military Academy at West Point, New York, in June 1923 and was commissioned in the Cavalry but transferred to the United States Army Air Corps in 1929. During World War II, he served in the China-Burma-India Theater and on Okinawa. After the war he became the commandant of the Air Tactical School. He commanded the Military Air Transport Service from 1952 until his retirement in 1958.

== Early life and career ==
Joseph Smith was born in Scranton, Pennsylvania, on 31 October 1901. He entered the United States Military Academy at West Point, New York, on 13 June 1919 and graduated on 12 June 1923, ranked 134th in his class. He was commissioned as a second lieutenant in the United States Cavalry and posted to the 8th Cavalry at Fort Bliss, Texas. In October 1924, he joined the 2nd Machine Gun Squadron, becoming its adjutant in February 1926.

Although Smith was always fond of horses and owned a couple himself, he realized that the days of horse cavalry were coming to a close. He therefore volunteered for pilot training. He was detailed to the United States Army Air Corps on 8 November 1927 for flight instruction at the Air Corps Primary Flying School at Brooks Field, Texas, where he was promoted to first lieutenant in the cavalry on 31 March 1928. He graduated on 30 June 1928 and became a student officer at the Air Corps Advanced Flying School at Kelly Field, Texas, where he specialized in aerial observation. He graduated on 30 October 1928, rated as an airplane pilot and observer, and was assigned to the 40th School Squadron at Kelly Field. He transferred to the Air Corps on 22 January 1929.

Smith served with the 66th Service Squadron at Nichols Field in the Philippines from 2 April 1929 to 12 March 1931. He then returned to Brooks Field as the post education and recreation officer. In October 1931, he moved to Kelly Field as education and recreation officer and in July 1932, assumed command of the Flying Cadet Detachment at the Air Corps Advanced Flying School. While at Kelly Field he met and married Anna Perle Krausse. They had two children: Joseph Michael Smith and Sandra Smith O’Keefe.

From 21 February to 7 May 1934, Smith was a pilot with the Army Air Corps-Mail Operations, flying the Salt Lake City, Utah, to Cheyenne, Wyoming, route under the command of Lieutenant Colonel Henry H. Arnold. Afterwards, he returned to Kelly Field as an instructor at the Air Corps Advanced Flying School. He became a flight commander in the 42nd Bombardment Squadron, a training unit there, in February 1935. He was promoted to the temporary rank captain on 16 March 1935; this became substantive on 1 August. From 1 August 1936 to 7 June 1937 he attended the Air Corps Tactical School at Maxwell Field, Alabama. He then went to Mitchel Field, New York, where he attended the Group Navigation School. He remained there as operations officer of the 9th Bombardment Group until 8 September 1938, when he left to attend the United States Army Command and General Staff College at Fort Leavenworth, Kansas. He returned to the 9th Bombardment squadron on completion of the course on 21 June 1939, and was promoted to the temporary rank of major on 11 March 1940.

== World War II ==
Smith's majority became substantive on 1 June 1940. That month, he went to Washington, D.C., as Assistant Chief of Staff, G-3 (Operations) at General Headquarters Air Force. He was promoted to lieutenant colonel on 15 November 1941, and was serving there when the United States entered World War II in December 1941. In March 1942, he joined the Operations Division of the War Department General Staff, and was promoted to colonel on 1 March 1942. He served on the Joint War Plans Committee of the Joint Chiefs of Staff from June 1943 until 31 December 1943. In his role as a senior planner, he accompanied President Franklin D. Roosevelt to the Cairo Conference in November 1943. On 1 January 1944, he became chief of staff of the Third Air Force at Tampa, Florida . He was promoted to brigadier general on 23 May 1944.

On 5 February 1945, Smith went to the China-Burma-India Theater (CBI), where he became chief of staff of the XX Bomber Command in . It was based in India, but was under orders to deploy the Boeing B-29 Superfortress bombers of its 58th Bomb Wing to the Mariana Islands. The XX Bomber Command's commander, Brigadier General Roger M. Ramey, went to the Marianas Islands as commander of the 58th Bomb Wing, and Smith became the XX Bomber Command's commander on 25 April. He was informed that the XX Bomber Command would move to the Philippines or Ryukyu Islands. In May, it was confirmed that its destination would be Okinawa, but in mid-June he was informed that the Eighth Air Force would be redeploying from Europe to Okinawa, and that the XX Bomber Command would be inactivated. Smith flew to Okinawa with the advance party on 3 July, and the XX Bomber Command was inactivated there on 16 July. For his service in CBI, Smith was awarded the Army Distinguished Service Medal. He served as assistant chief of staff, G-3, and deputy chief of staff of the Eight Air Force until 27 September. For this service, he was awarded the Bronze Star Medal and an oak leaf cluster to his Distinguished Service Medal.

== Later life and career ==
Smith returned to the United States, where he became assistant chief of air staff for plans at Air Corps headquarters in Washington, D.C., in October 1945. The following month, he became chief of staff of the Air University at Maxwell Field. He was commandant of the Air Corps Tactical School at Tyndall Field, Florida, from 1 July 1946 to 14 July 1947. From 21 August 1947 to 30 November 1948, he was the headquarters commandant of the U.S. Air Forces in Europe, in Wiesbaden, Germany. As such he was in charge of the first flights of the Berlin Airlift on 26 June 1948, for which he was awarded the Legion of Merit and the Medal for Humane Action. He returned to Washington, D.C., where he was chief of the War Plans Division at United States Air Force Headquarters from 5 January to 30 April 1949. The following day, he became the deputy director of plans and operations. He was promoted to major general on 16 September 1949. In July 1950, the directorate of plans and operations was divided in two, and he became director of plans in July 1951.

On 15 November 1951, Smith assumed command of the Military Air Transport Service (MATS), which was based at Andrews Air Force Base, Maryland. He was promoted to lieutenant general in July 1952. He held this position until he retired on 29 June 1958. He improved the MATS air safety record, reducing the number of Class A accidents (those involving the loss of an aircraft or serious injury to the crew) from 16 per 1,000 hours of operation in 1951 to 3.65 per 1,000 hours in 1958. Under his command, the MATS participated in many operations, including the Korean War in 1951 to 1953, the airlift of French Foreign Legion troops from Saigon, Vietnam, after the French withdrawal in 1954, the American response to the Suez Crisis in 1956, and the evacuation of 14,000 Hungarian refugees following the abortive Hungarian Revolution of 1956. He was awarded an oak leaf cluster to his Legion of Merit.

Following his retirement, Smith was appointed to the Bolte Board, which was established by the United States Secretary of Defense to review the promotion and separation laws for Army, Navy and Air Force officers. He was concerned about the welfare of the troops fighting in the Vietnam War, and was a founder of the National Association of Uniformed Services (NAUS) in 1968, and was a director of its political action committee.

Smith died from respiratory heart failure at the Andrews Air Force Base Hospital on 19 May 1993, and was buried in Arlington National Cemetery.

== Dates of rank ==
Insignia	Rank	Component	Date	Reference
	Second Lieutenant	Cavalry	12 June 1923	
	First Lieutenant	Cavalry	31 March 1928	
	First Lieutenant	Air Corps	22 January 1929	
	Captain (temporary)	Air Corps	16 March 1935	
	Captain	Air Corps	1 August 1935	
	Major (temporary)	Air Corps	11 March 1940	
	Major	Air Corps	1 July 1940	
	Lieutenant Colonel	Army of the United States Air Corps	15 November 1941	
	Lieutenant Colonel	Army of the United States	24 December 1941	
	Colonel	Army of the United States Air Corps	1 March 1942	
	Colonel	Army of the United States	6 July 1942	
	Brigadier General	Army of the United States	23 May 1944	
	Major General	United States Air Force	16 September 1949	
	Lieutenant General	United States Air Force	July 1952	
