= Phillips Waller Smith =

United States Air Force general

Phillips Waller Smith (June 28, 1906 – February 16, 1963) was a major general in the United States Air Force.

Smith was born in Saint Paul, Minnesota. He attended the University of Wisconsin-Madison, the Massachusetts Institute of Technology, and Harvard University.

== Career ==
Smith graduated from the United States Military Academy in 1930. During World War II, he served with the United States Strategic Air Forces in Europe. In 1953, he was named Comptroller of Air Material Command.

Awards he received include the Legion of Merit with oak leaf cluster and the Army Commendation Medal.
