= USS O'Brien (TB-30) =

Torpedo boat of the United States Navy

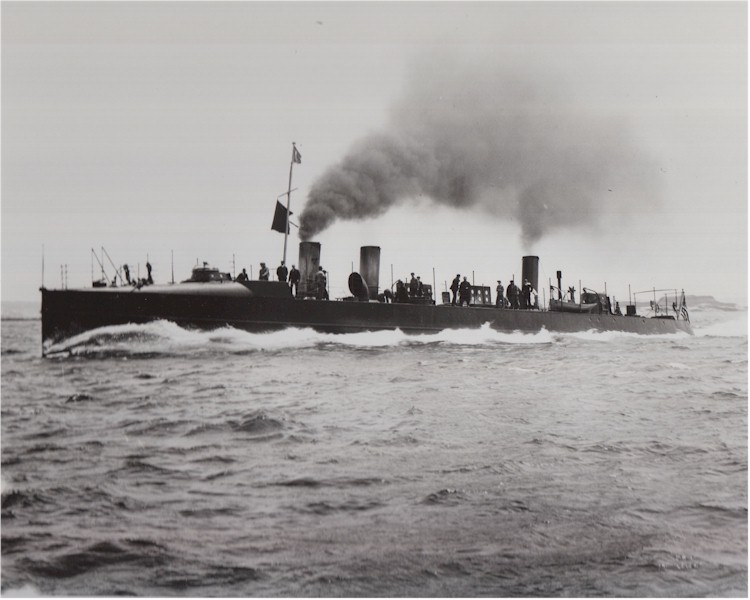
- USS O'Brien TB-30, undated, running trials before installation of armament.

History

United States
- Name: O’Brien
- Namesake: Captain Jeremiah O’Brien (1744–1818)
- Builder: Lewis Nixon Shipyard, Elizabethtown, New Jersey
- Laid down: 29 December 1898
- Launched: 24 September 1900
- Sponsored by: Miss Mira O’Brien, great-great granddaughter of Joseph O’Brien
- Commissioned: 15 July 1905; 121 years ago
- Decommissioned: date unknown
- Stricken: 3 March 1909; 117 years ago
- Fate: Used as a target

General characteristics
- Class & type: Blakely-class torpedo boat
- Displacement: 220 long tons (220 t)
- Length: 157 ft (48 m)
- Beam: 17 ft (5.2 m)
- Draft: 6 ft 6 in (1.98 m) (mean)
- Installed power: not known
- Propulsion: not known
- Speed: 25 kn (29 mph; 46 km/h)
- Complement: 28 officers and enlisted
- Armament: 3 × 1-pounder, 2 × 18 inch (450 mm) torpedo tubes

USS O’Brien (TB-30) was a Blakely-class torpedo boat in the United States Navy named after Captain Jeremiah O'Brien and his five brothers, Gideon, John, William, Dennis and Joseph, who captured HMS Margaretta on June 12, 1775 during the American Revolution.

== Built in Elizabeth, New Jersey ==
The first ship to be so named by the Navy, O’Brien (Torpedo Boat 30) was laid down under the direct supervision of naval architect Arthur Leopold Busch at Navy Lt. Lewis Nixon's, Crescent Shipyard of Elizabethport, New Jersey, 29 December 1898; launched 24 September 1900; sponsored by Miss Mira O’Brien, great-great granddaughter of Joseph O’Brien; and commissioned 15 July 1905.

== Service with the U.S. Navy ==
Between August 1905 and April 1906, she operated with the coastal squadron between Newport, Rhode Island, and Pensacola, Florida.

== Inactivation ==
She was sailed to the Reserve Torpedo Flotilla at the Norfolk Navy Yard on the 7th of May, 1906. She was struck from the Navy List on the 3rd of March 1909 and was used as target practice.
