= Steve Smith (pool player) =

American pool player

Steve Smith (born 1954) is a recognized American professional pool player and pool hustler from Dallas, Texas. He is nicknamed "the Lizard".
