= Stephen Smith (footballer, born 1986) =

English footballer

Personal information
- Full name: Stephen Smith
- Date of birth: 19 September 1986 (age 40)
- Place of birth: Cambridge, England
- Height: 5 ft 8 in (1.73 m)
- Position: Midfielder

Team information
- Current team: Cambridge United
- Number: 18

Senior career*
| Years | Team | Apps | (Gls) |
| 2003–2008 | Cambridge United | 49 | (4) |
- * Club domestic league appearances and goals as of 25/04/07

Stephen Smith (born 19 September 1986) is an English former footballer who played for Cambridge United.

A midfield player, Smith graduated through the club's youth system and was given his debut by French manager Herve Renard as a 17-year-old in a match at Doncaster Rovers in April 2004. The match at Doncaster Rovers was to be Smith's final first team appearance for nearly 18 months and he failed to make an appearance as the club were relegated from the Football League in 2005.

Since Cambridge's relegation to the Nationwide Conference, Smith has become a more regular player in the team's midfield.
