= USS O'Brien (DD-415) =

Sims-class destroyer

Coordinates: 13°30′S 171°18′W

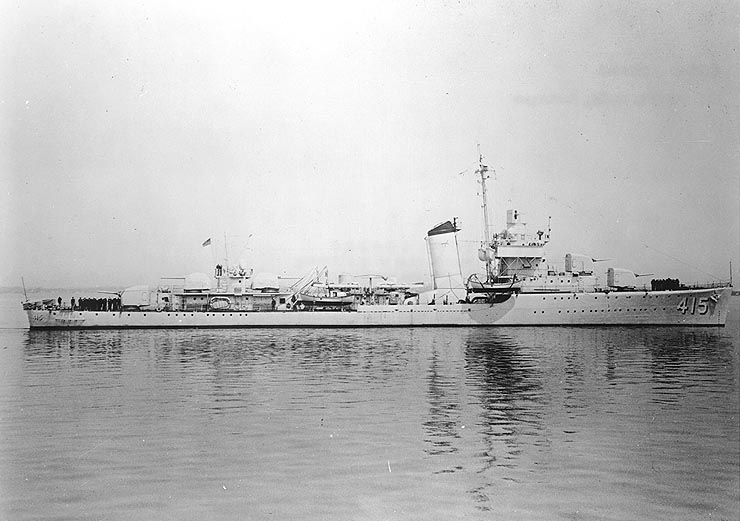
- O'Brien c. 1940

History

United States
- Name: USS O'Brien
- Builder: Boston Navy Yard
- Laid down: 31 May 1938
- Launched: 20 February 1939
- Commissioned: 2 March 1940
- Honors and awards: American Defense Service Medal ("Fleet" clasp); Asiatic-Pacific Campaign Medal (1 star); World War II Victory Medal
- Fate: Torpedoed by I-19 15 September 1942, foundered on 19 October 1942

General characteristics
- Class & type: Sims-class destroyer
- Displacement: 1,570 long tons (1,600 t) (std); 2,211 long tons (2,246 t) (full)
- Length: 348 ft 3 1/4 in (106.2 m)
- Beam: 36 ft 1 in (11.0 m)
- Draft: 13 ft 4.5 in (4.1 m)
- Propulsion: High-pressure super-heated boilers; Geared turbines with twin screws; 50,000 hp (37,000 kW)
- Speed: 35 knots (65 km/h; 40 mph)
- Range: 3,660 nmi (6,780 km; 4,210 mi) at 20 kn (37 km/h; 23 mph)
- Complement: 192 (10 officers/182 enlisted)
- Armament: 5 × 5 inch/38, in single mounts; 4 × .50 caliber/90, in single mounts; 8 × 21 inch torpedo tubes in two quadruple mounts; 2 × depth charge track, 10 depth charges

USS O'Brien (DD-415) was a World War II-era Sims-class destroyer in the service of the United States Navy, named in honor of Captain Jeremiah O'Brien and his five brothers, Gideon, John, William, Dennis and Joseph, who captured HMS Margaretta on 12 June 1775 during the American Revolution.

O’Brien was laid down at Boston Navy Yard, Boston, Massachusetts, on 31 May 1938; launched on 20 October 1939; sponsored by Miss Josephine O’Brien Campbell, a great-great-great-granddaughter of Gideon O’Brien; and commissioned on 2 March 1940. Since this warship was built in a drydock, along with the destroyers Walke, Lansdale, and Madison, the christening and commissioning ceremonies were combined.

== Service history ==
Following her commissioning, O'Brien operated along the Eastern Seaboard of the United States.

=== World War II ===
After drydocking and repairs during the fall of 1941, O'Brien left Norfolk, Virginia on 15 January 1942 along with the battleship Idaho and the destroyer Mustin, and then steamed for the Pacific Ocean. Transiting the Panama Canal on 20 January, the trio of ships arrived in San Francisco, California, on 31 January.

O'Brien steamed with a convoy for the Western Pacific on 4 February 1942, but she was forced to return when a collision with the destroyer Case damaged her port side. Following repairs at the Mare Island Navy Yard, the destroyer steamed out again on 20 February, bound for Pearl Harbor. There Commander Destroyer Division 4 shifted his flag to O’Brien on 5 March 1942.

After operating out of Pearl Harbor and patrolling the Hawaiian atoll, French Frigate Shoals, O'Brien called at Midway Island in the latter part of March, escorting the seaplane tender Curtiss there to evacuate civilians. The two warships returned to Pearl Harbor on 3 April. After an increase and improvement of her antiaircraft batteries, she embarked passengers for transportation to the Naval Air Station at Palmyra Atoll, and then steamed out on 18 April with the destroyers Flusser and Mugford. The destroyer then joined convoys from San Diego and San Francisco to escort them to American Samoa, arriving at Pago Pago on 28 April.

O'Brien was retained at Pago Pago for local escort work. On 26 May, she supported the occupation of Wallis Island, previously taken over by the Free French, and then she joined the auxiliary vessel Procyon on 19 June for the return voyage to Pearl Harbor. Operating out of Pearl Harbor, the ship performed escort duty and acted as patrol and plane guard. She got underway on 17 August with Task Force 17 (TF 17) to reinforce the South Pacific Force, screening the tanker Guadalupe.

==== Sinking ====
While escorting a convoy of troop transports en route to Guadalcanal, the combined Task Forces 17 and 18 were attacked by the Japanese submarine I-19 on 15 September 1942. The aircraft carrier Wasp was sunk, and the battleship North Carolina and O’Brien were damaged by a spread of six torpedoes from the submarine.

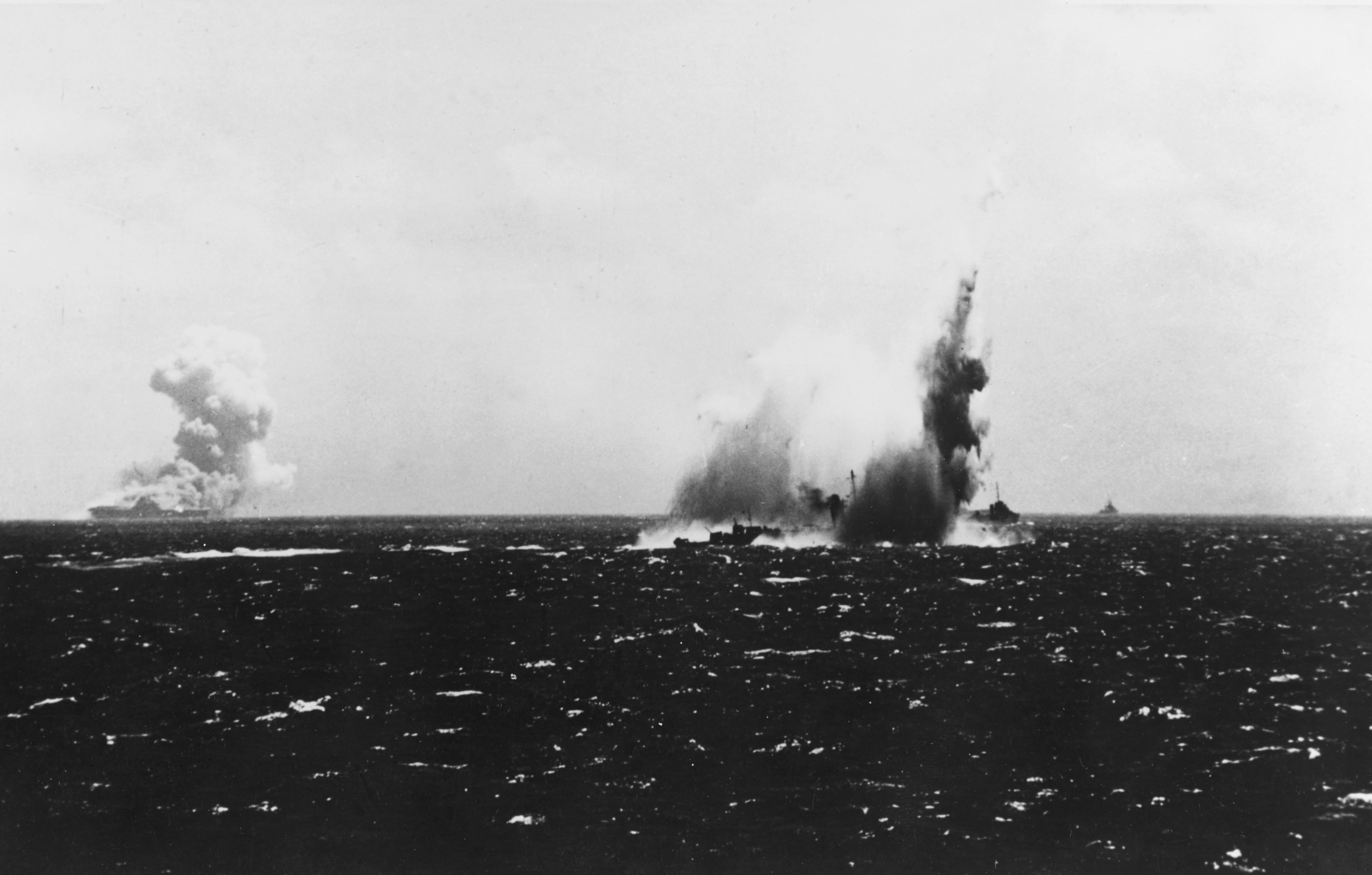
Torpedo from I-19 hits O’Brien. USS Wasp can be seen burning in the background.

At 1452, O’Brien sighted smoke coming from Wasp. As a member of the aircraft carrier Hornet's ASW screen, she made an emergency turn to the right. At about 1454, while accelerating and swinging right, her lookouts spotted a torpedo two points forward of the port beam, 1,000 yards (910 m) away. This torpedo then missed O'Brien close astern, but while her crew's attention was concentrated on it, another torpedo hit her port bow.

This explosion did little obvious damage, but it set up severe structural stresses throughout the framework of O'Brien. She was able to proceed under her own power, and on 16 September she reached Espiritu Santo, where the sailors from Curtiss made temporary repairs. O’Brien next steamed out on 21 September, bound for Noumea, New Caledonia, for further repairs by the repair ship Argonne. Then, she steamed out on 10 October, bound for San Francisco Bay.

O'Brien made it to Suva in Fiji on 13 October, and then steamed out once more on 16 October. The rate of leakage of seawater into O'Brien continued to increase, and on 18 October it was necessary for O’Brien to head for the nearest anchorage. Large amounts of topside weights were jettisoned, and preparations were made for abandoning the ship, but her captain still thought that she could be taken intact to Pago Pago. However, at about 0600 on 19 October, her bottom suddenly split open considerably, and her forward and after hull portions began to work independently. At 0630, all hands except for a small salvage crew abandoned, but half an hour later O'Brien was abandoned entirely. Just before 0800 she descended beneath the waves, and after steaming nearly 3,000 nautical miles (5,600 km) since she had been torpedoed. All members of her crew were saved.

== Awards and memorabilia ==
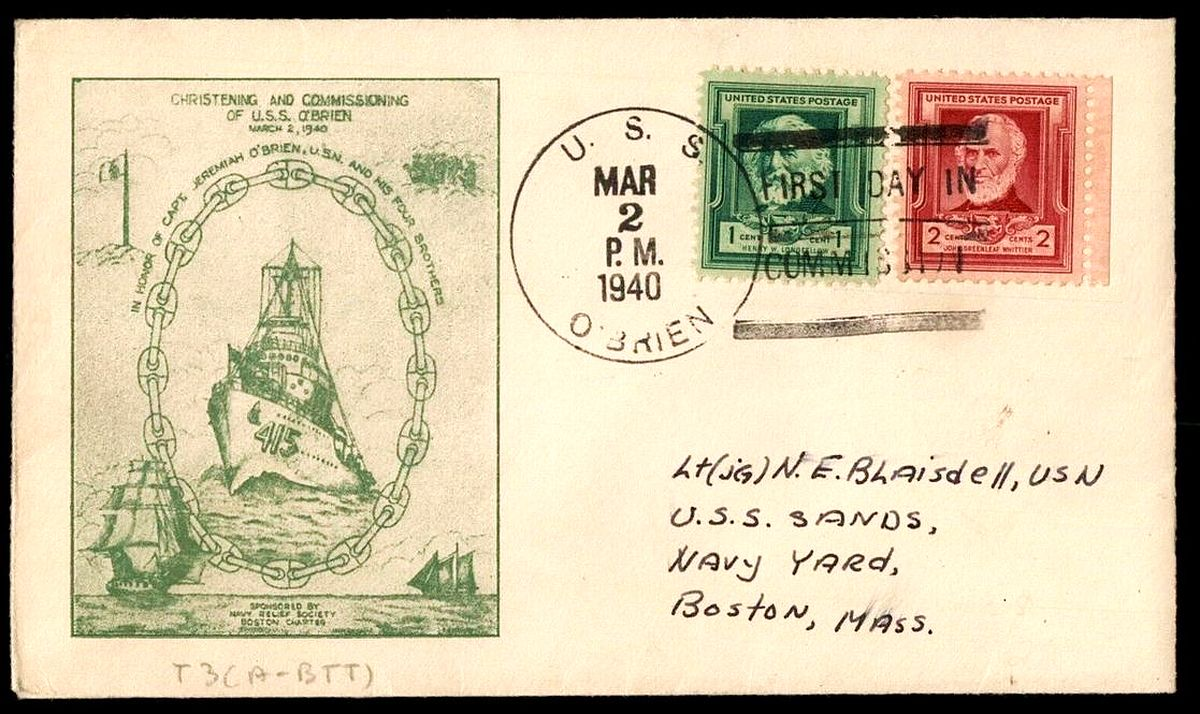
USS O'Brien, naval cover, postmarked on day of commissioning, 2 March 1940

USS O'Brien earned one battle star during World War II.
