= USS O'Brien (DD-975) =

Spruance-class destroyer

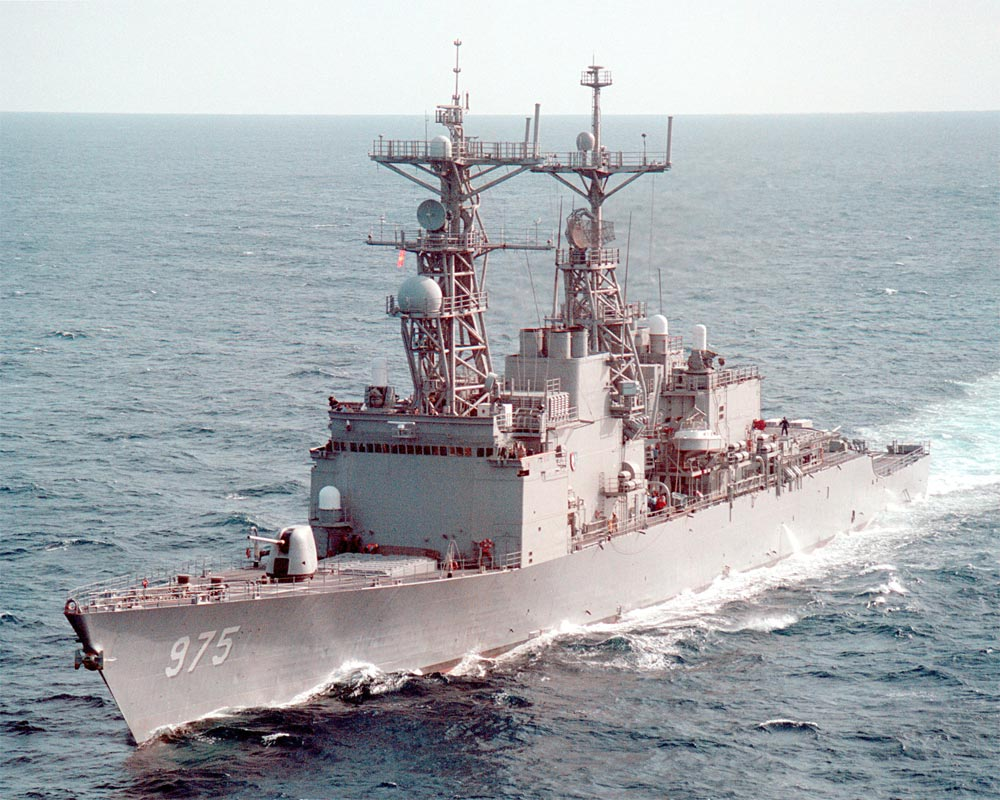
- USS O'Brien at sea

History

United States
- Name: O'Brien
- Namesake: Jeremiah O'Brien; Gideon O'Brien; John O'Brien; William O'Brien; Dennis O'Brien; Joseph O'Brien
- Ordered: 26 January 1972
- Builder: Ingalls Shipbuilding
- Laid down: 9 May 1975
- Launched: 8 July 1976
- Acquired: 14 November 1977
- Commissioned: 3 December 1977
- Decommissioned: 24 September 2004
- Stricken: 24 September 2004
- Identification: Callsign: NECG; Hull number: DD-975
- Motto: Loyalty, Unity, Freedom
- Fate: Sunk as target, 9 February 2006
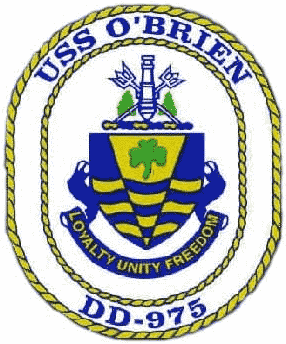
- Badge

General characteristics
- Class & type: Spruance-class destroyer
- Displacement: 8,040 long tons (8,170 t) full load
- Length: 529 ft (161 m) waterline; 563 ft (172 m) overall
- Beam: 55 ft (17 m)
- Draft: 29 ft (8.8 m)
- Installed power: 3 × 501-K17 generator sets (2,000 kW (2,700 hp) each)
- Propulsion: 4 × General Electric LM2500 gas turbines, 2 shafts, 80,000 shp (60 MW)
- Speed: 32.5 knots (60.2 km/h; 37.4 mph)
- Range: 6,000 nmi (11,000 km; 6,900 mi) at 20 knots (37 km/h; 23 mph)
- Complement: 19 officers, 315 enlisted
- Sensors & processing systems: AN/SPS-40 air search radar; AN/SPG-60 fire control radar; AN/SPS-55 surface search radar; AN/SPQ-9 gun fire control radar; Mark 23 TAS automatic detection and tracking radar; AN/SPS-65 missile fire control radar; AN/SQS-53 bow-mounted active sonar; AN/SQR-19 TACTAS towed array passive sonar; Naval Tactical Data System
- Electronic warfare & decoys: AN/SLQ-32 electronic warfare system; AN/SLQ-25 Nixie torpedo countermeasures; Mark 36 SRBOC decoy launching system; AN/SLQ-49 inflatable decoys
- Armament: 2 × 5 in (127 mm) 54 caliber Mark 45 dual purpose guns; 2 × 20 mm Phalanx CIWS Mark 15 guns; 1 × 8 cell ASROC launcher (removed); 1 × 8 cell NATO Sea Sparrow Mark 29 missile launcher; 2 × quadruple Harpoon missile canisters; 2 × Mark 32 triple 12.75 in (324 mm) torpedo tubes (Mk 46 torpedoes); 1 × 61 cell Mk 41 VLS launcher for Tomahawk missiles
- Aircraft carried: 2 × Sikorsky SH-60 Seahawk LAMPS III helicopters
- Aviation facilities: Flight deck and enclosed hangar for up to two medium-lift helicopters

USS O'Brien (DD-975) was a Spruance-class destroyer built by the Ingalls Shipbuilding Division of Litton Industries at Pascagoula, Mississippi. It was named for Captain Jeremiah O'Brien and his five brothers: Gideon, John, William, Dennis and Joseph. The O'Briens were crew members on board the sloop Unity, which captured HMS Margaretta at the entrance to Machias harbor on 12 June 1775. O'Brien was decommissioned on 24 September 2004, and was later sunk as part of a training exercise in 2006.

== History ==
The destroyer has completed seven major deployments to the Western Pacific/Indian Oceans and seven deployments to the Persian Gulf.

During her third deployment (13 January 1984 – 1 August 1984), which included 81 consecutive days at sea in the Indian Ocean, O'Brien took part in two refugee rescue missions, earning the Humanitarian Service Medal.

O'Brien's fourth western pacific deployment (January 1986 – June 1986) took the destroyer further north. Operations included joint U.S./Korean naval exercises TEAM SPIRIT 86 and TAE KWAN DO 86–1. Ports visited: Subic Bay and Manila, Philippines; Okinawa, Sasebo and Yokosuka, Japan; Pohang and Pusan, Korea; Hong Kong

Following the installation of an advanced towed array sonar system in 1987, O'Brien conducted experimental sonar evaluation operations in the Northern Pacific and Bering Sea.

During her fifth deployment, O'Brien became part of the Middle East Force. O'Brien participated in Operation Earnest Will, escorting reflagged Kuwaiti tankers, and Operation Praying Mantis, during which O'Brien was a key member of the three-ship surface action group that engaged and sank the Iranian guided missile frigate Sahand.

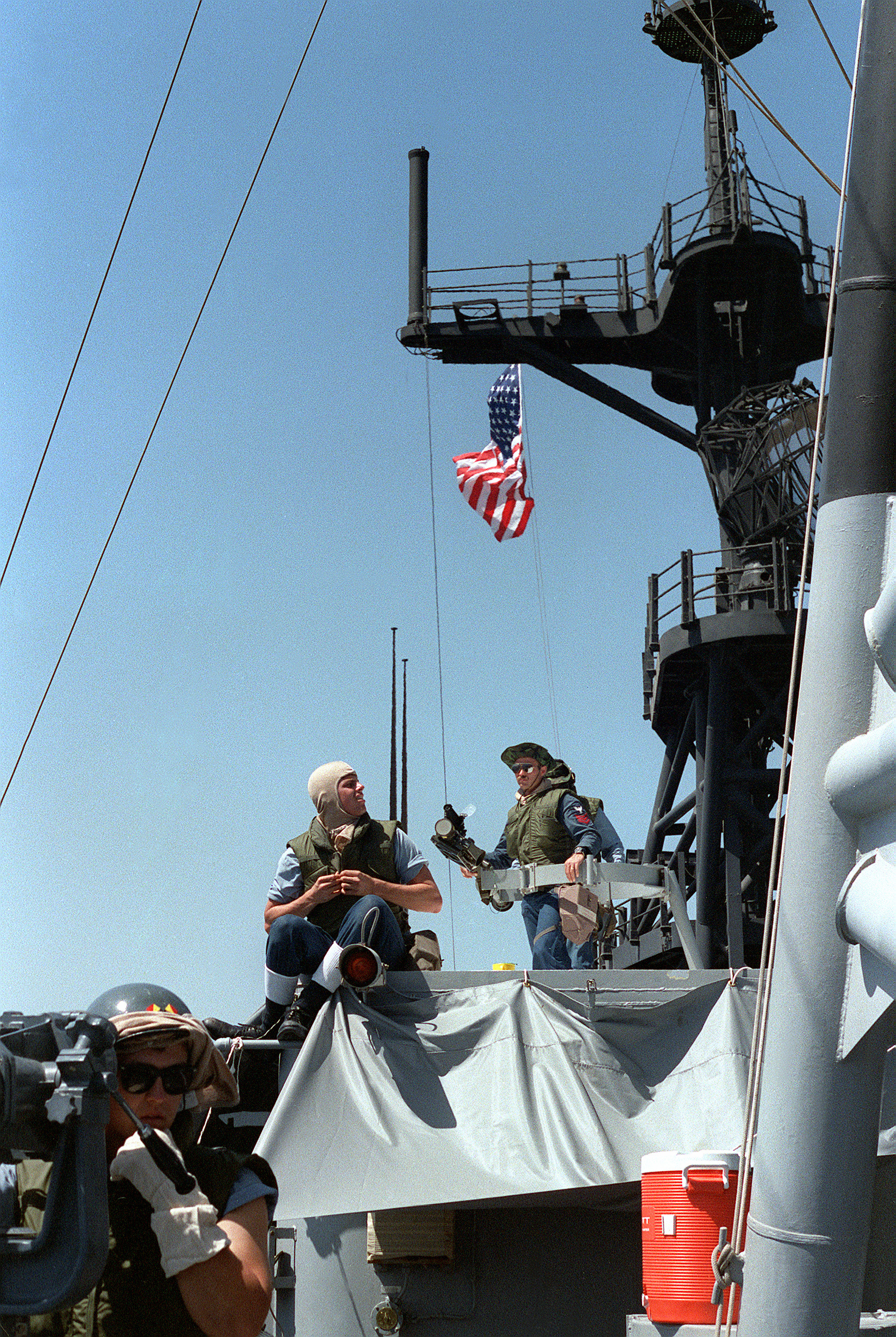
USS O'Brien's crewmember on 18 April 1988

O'Brien underwent an extensive overhaul and received major weapon systems improvements in 1988 including the Mk 41 Vertical Launch System (VLS) for the Tomahawk cruise missile, the SQR-1 tactical towed array sonar system and the LAMPS MK III helicopter system.

While assigned to the Middle East Force from September to December 1990, O'Brien participated in Operation Desert Shield. Conducting Persian Gulf patrols in support of the United Nations embargo of Iraq, O'Brien investigated over four hundred vessels.

In December 1991 and again from February to April 1992, O'Brien conducted counter narcotic operations off the coasts of Central and South America.

In August 1992, O'Brien departed San Diego to become a member of the Forward Deployed Naval Forces. En route from San Diego to Yokosuka, O'Brien conducted follow-on testing and evaluation of the vertically launched anti-submarine rocket and the SQQ-89 sonar system on the Pacific Missile Test Range off Kauaʻi, Hawaii. O'Brien arrived in Yokosuka, Japan, in October 1992.

In June 1993, O'Brien departed Yokosuka for her third deployment to the Middle East Force where she conducted Persian Gulf patrols in support of Operation Southern Watch and surveillance operations in the Gulf of Oman.

O'Brien participated in several joint exercises with the U.S. Marines and Air Force, as well as combined exercises with the Armed Forces of Singapore, Brunei, and the Republic of Korea. O'Brien departed on her fourth Middle East Force deployment on 17 February 1995 and continued to conduct operations in support of the United Nations embargo on Iraq.

O'Brien's operational tempo remained very high throughout 1996, including her fifth Middle East Force Deployment, participating in the large naval exercise RIMPAC '96 as well as a member of the Taiwan contingency force. During Pacific Middle East Force (PACMEF), O'Brien continued conducting operations in support of the United Nations embargo on Iraq and her efforts resulted in the seizure of over 1.5 million gallons of contraband oil.

O'Brien was away from homeport for 233 days in 1996, but was awarded with the Battle E Device, Meritorious Unit Commendation, Humanitarian Service Award and then nominated for the prestigious Spokane Trophy.

In 1999, O'Brien participated in exercises with the Philippine Navy and in CROCEX '99 with the Royal Australian Navy.

2000 was yet another high tempo year with 188 days spent underway. O'Brien participated in Counter Special Operations Forces Exercise (CSOFEX) in Korea, COBRA Gold 2000, East Timor operations and completed an entire tactical training cycle in a record 19 days.

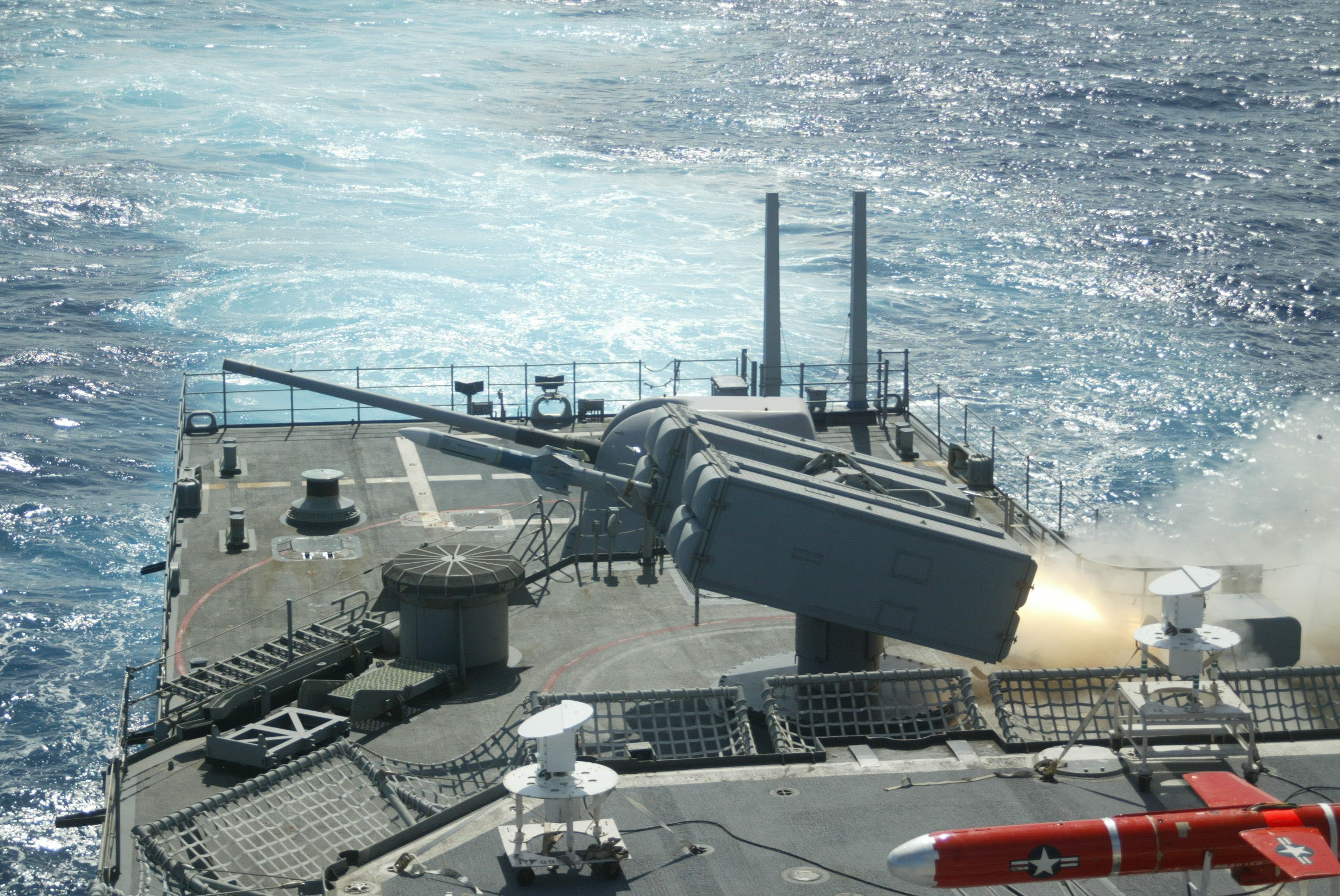
USS O'Brien launches a Sea Sparrow missile on 5 November 2003

All of the previous years' hard work paid off in 2001 when O'Brien participated in PACMEF '01, conducting maritime interdiction operations, including boarding over thirty merchant vessels throughout the summer in the Persian Gulf. On 11 September, O'Brien emergency sortied from Bahrain to the Arabian Sea. She participated in the opening Tomahawk cruise missile strikes into Afghanistan in support of Operation Enduring Freedom.

=== Sinking ===
In early 2006, the ex-USS O'Brien was sunk by missiles from HMCS Vancouver, 5-inch (127 mm) shells from USS Lake Erie and two P3C Orion patrol aircraft in a combined fleet training exercise off the Pacific Missile Range Facility near Kauaʻi, Hawaii.

== Ship's crest ==
O'Brien's official crest, as exhibited, symbolizes the rich tradition of courage and determination initiated by Jeremiah O'Brien, and continued by those ships that bore his name.

The golden pile and its associated elements are resplendent in symbolism. The pile, in conjunction with the way bars, represents a ship at sea and is symbolic of the grand tradition of the U.S. Navy. Taken by itself, the pile also represents the Roman numeral "V", equaling the total number of ships, including DD-975, to be honored with the name of O'Brien. The shamrock centered at the top of the pile alludes to Jeremiah O'Brien's Irish ancestry and, in addition, to the arms of the previous O'Brien (DD-725).

The crossed nautical tridents overlapped by the single cannon dedicate the first naval battle of the American Revolution in which Jeremiah O'Brien and his men defeated the British warship, Margaretta. O'Brien and his men, armed with only limited muskets, axes, and pitchforks (represented by the crossed tridents) boarded Margaretta and defeated an enemy armed with superior guns and training.

Pine trees on either side of the cannon symbolize the state of Maine, the home of Jeremiah O'Brien and the site of his famed victory. Reflected in the ship's motto, "Loyalty, Unity, Freedom", are the qualities of Captain O'Brien's contribution to the American Revolution. The motto also displays the guile of a long line of U.S. Navy sailors on ships named O'Brien.

== Gallery ==
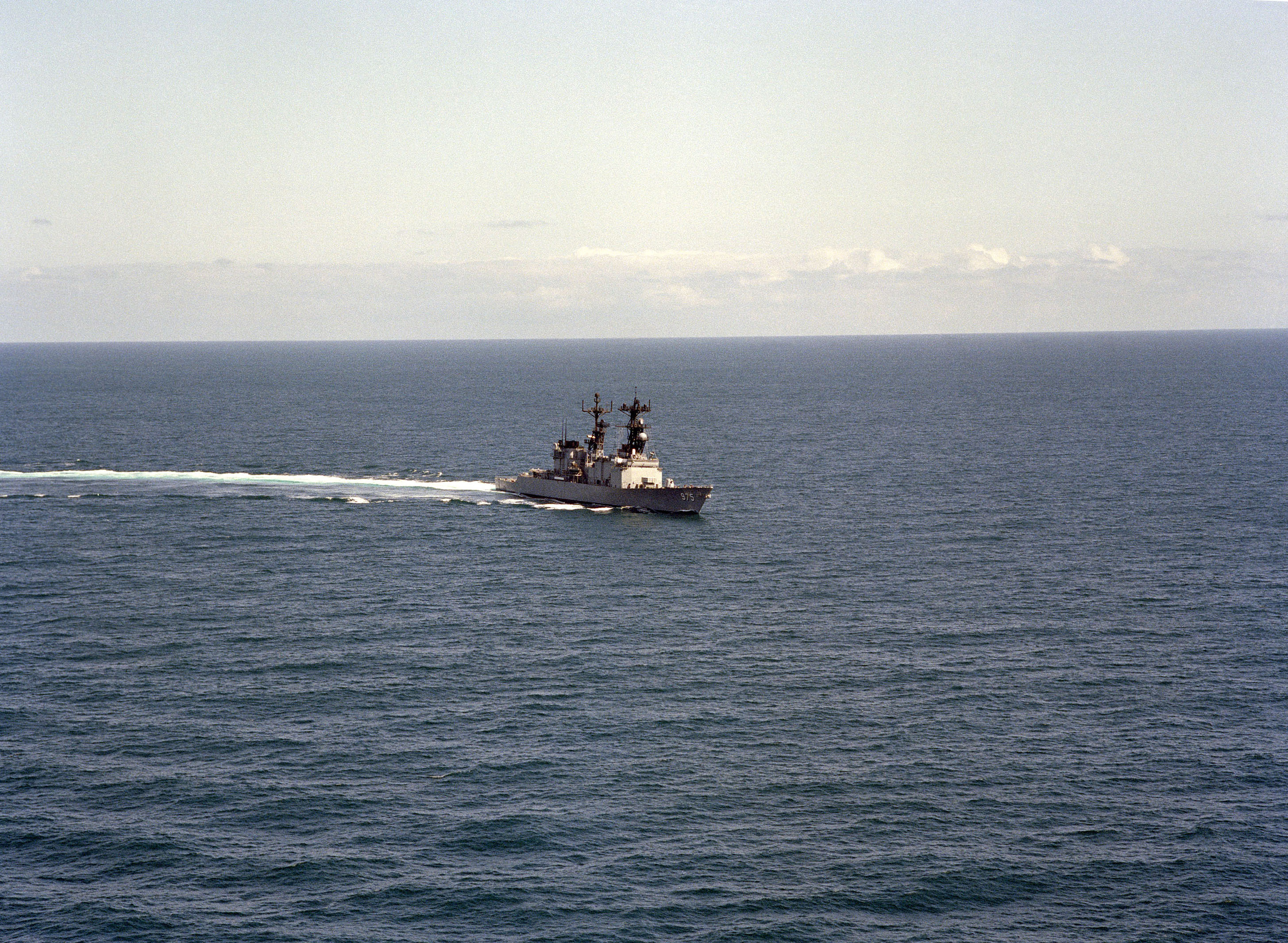
USS O'Brien on 6 May 1983

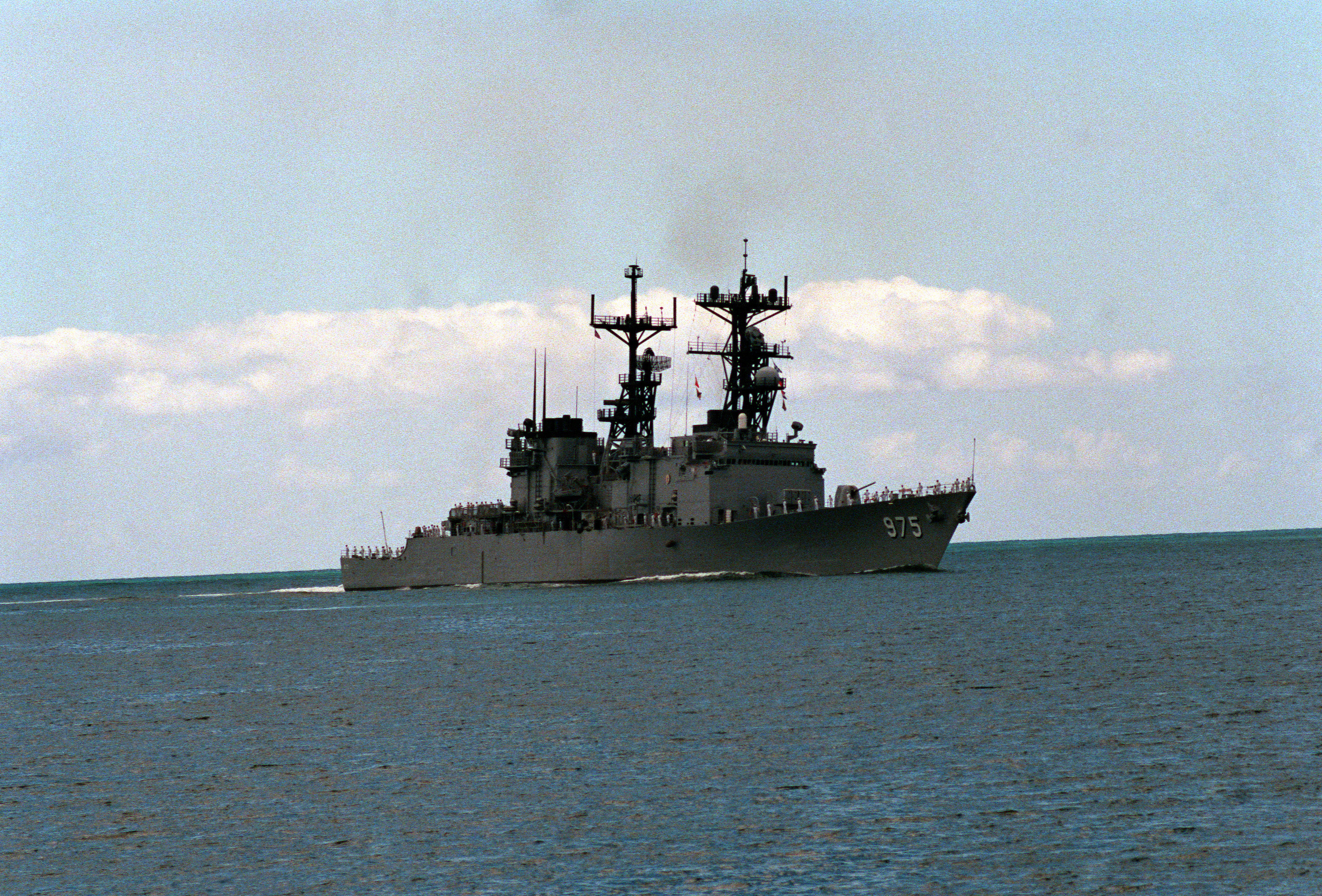
USS O'Brien on 1 April 1987

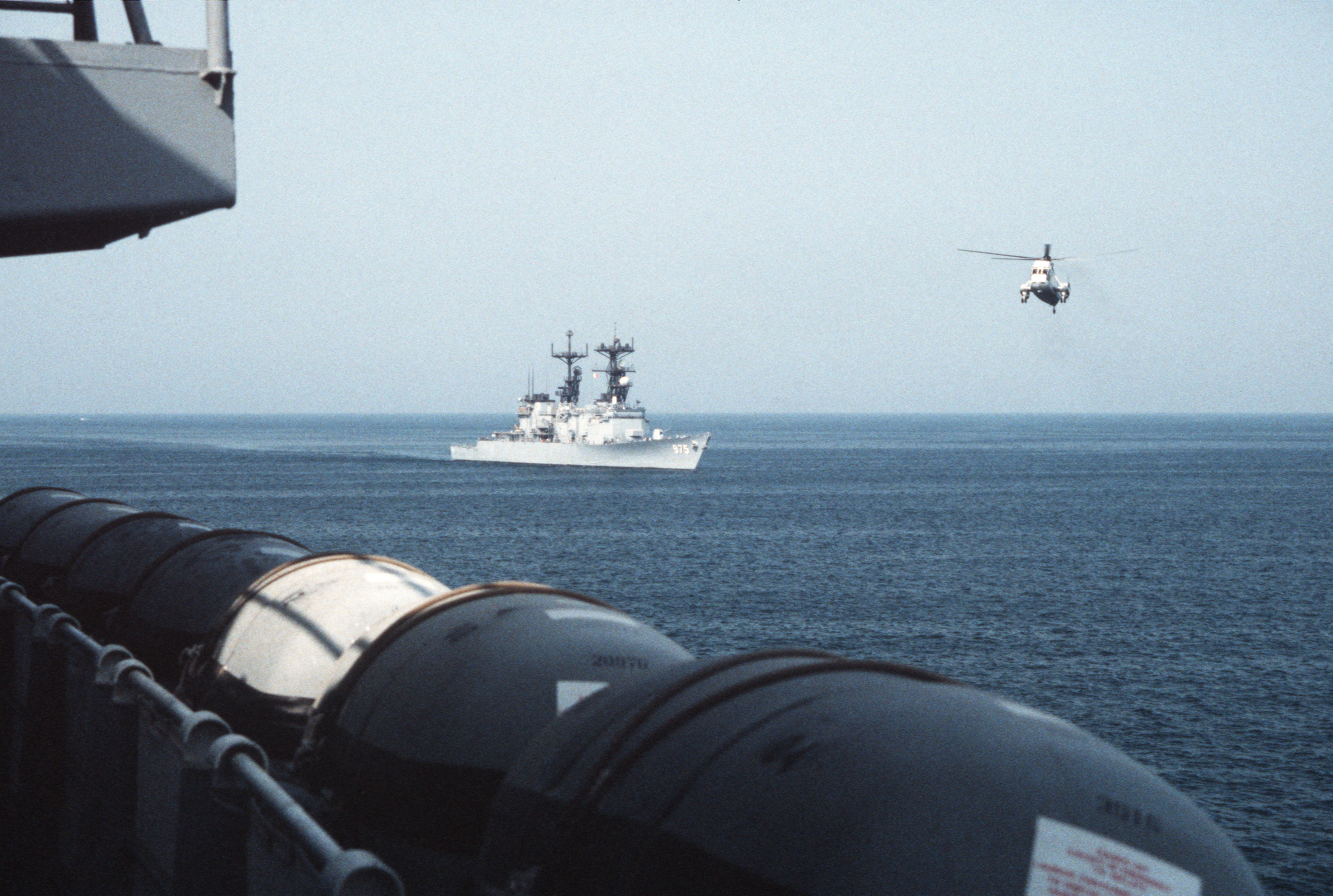
USS O'Brien on 1 October 1988

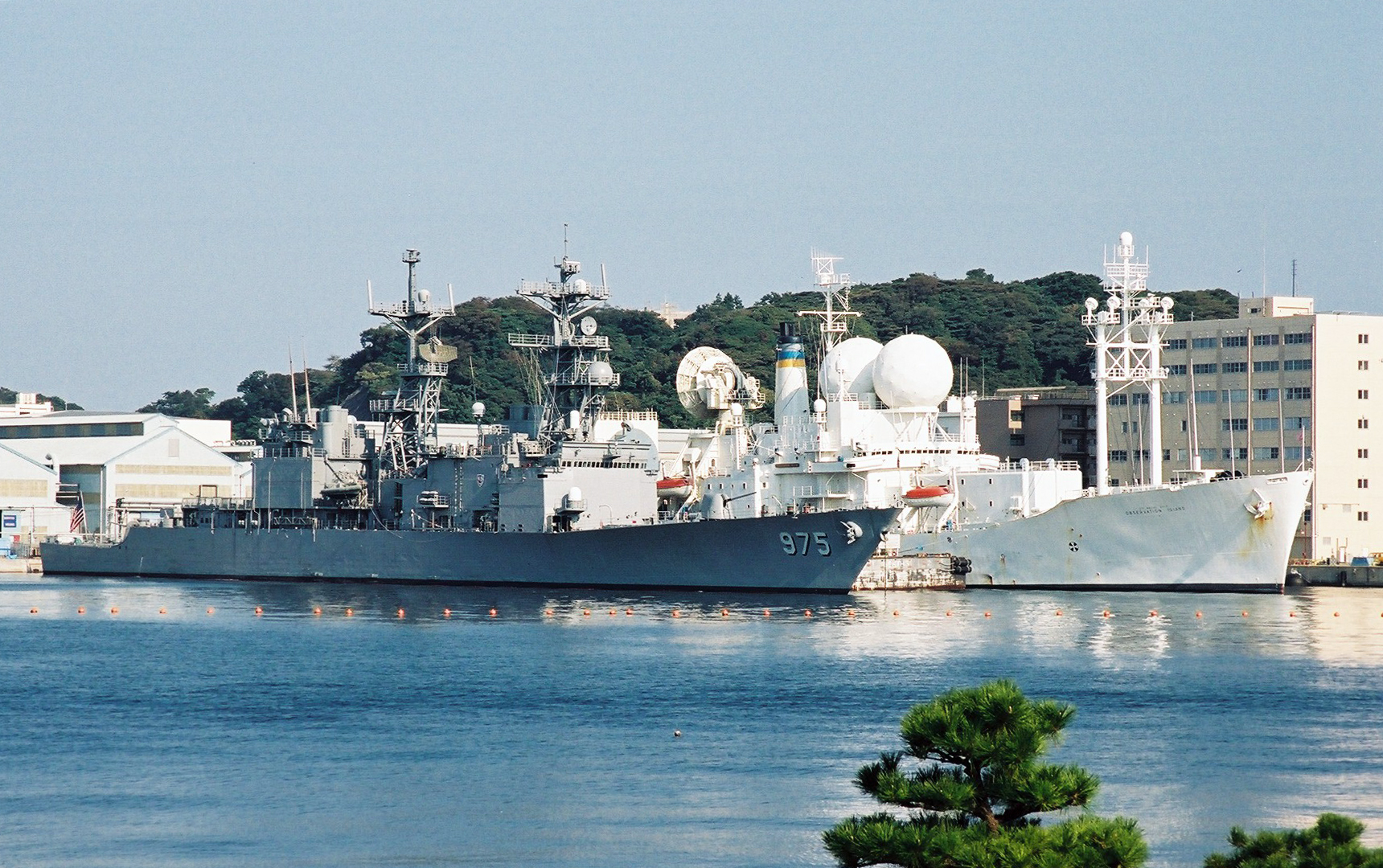
USS O'Brien with the missile tracking ship, USNS Observation Island at Port of Yokosuka, Japan on 14 October 2002

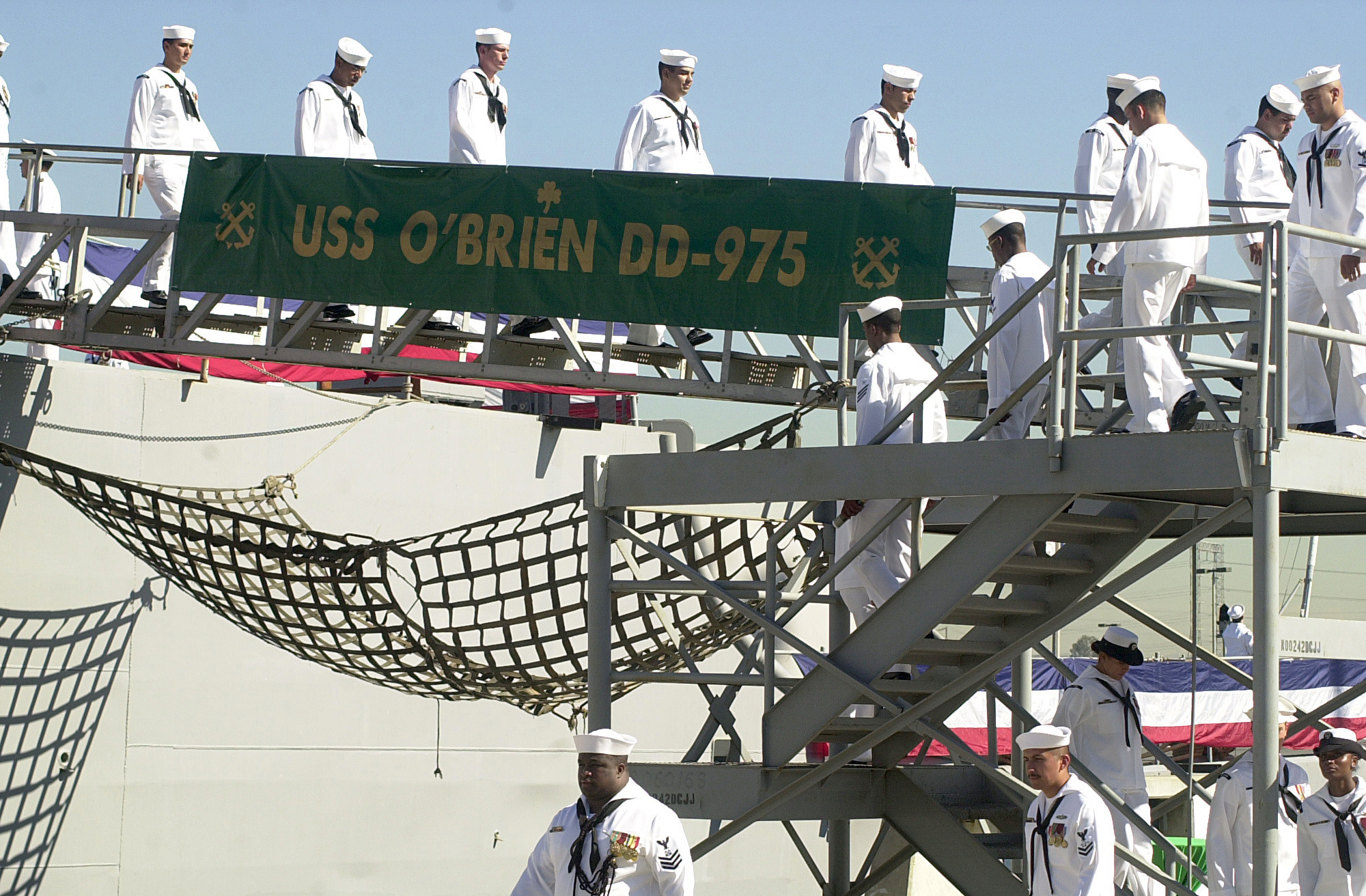
USS O'Brien's decommissioning ceremony on 24 September 2004

== See also ==
- List of destroyers of the United States Navy
