= F. Neale Smith =

American naval admiral (1930–2020)

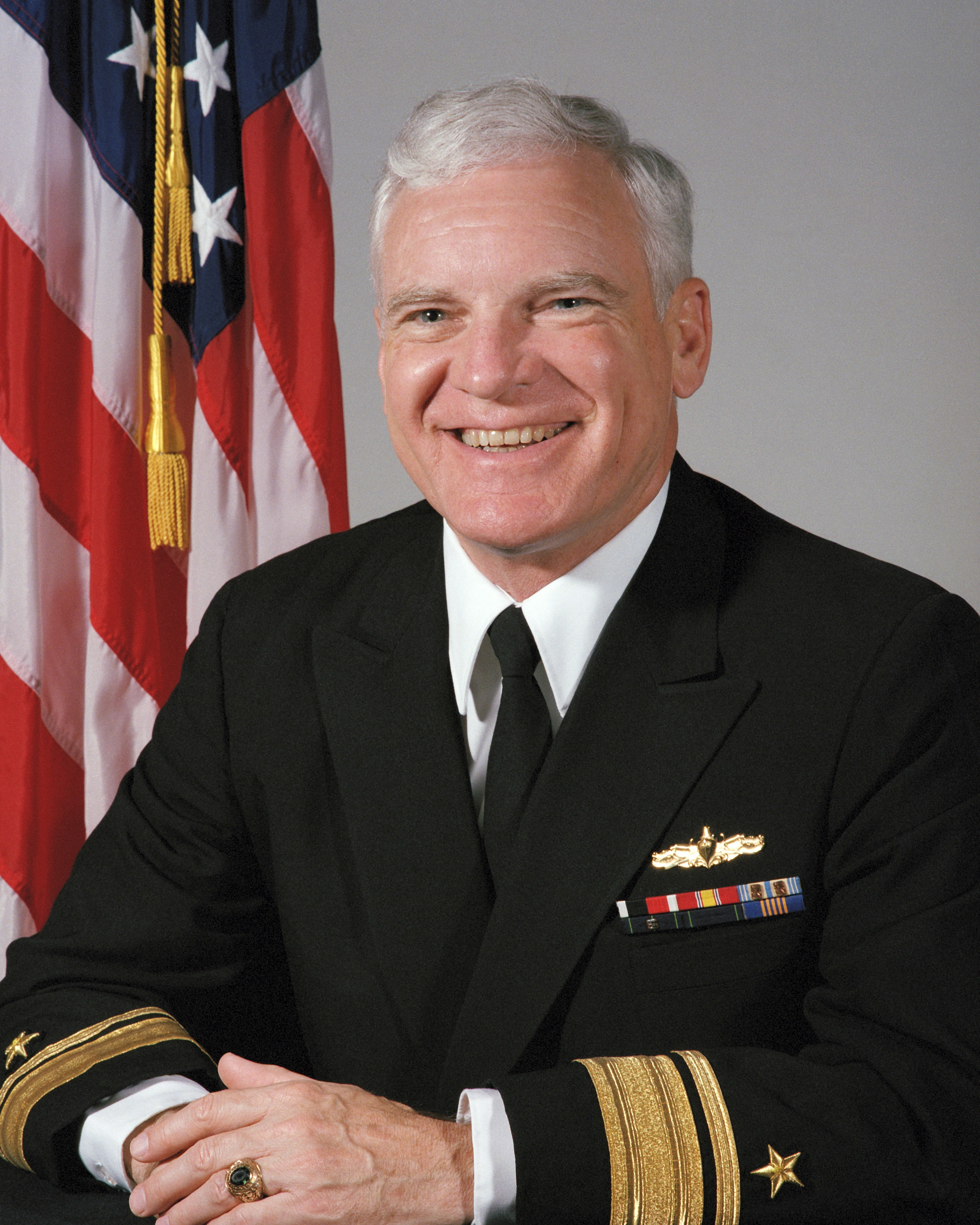
- Born: December 26, 1930; Baltimore, Maryland
- Died: August 15, 2020 (aged 89); The Woodlands, Texas
- Military career
- Allegiance: United States
- Branch: United States Navy
- Rank: Rear Admiral
- Commands: United States Naval Reserve

Francis Neale Smith (December 26, 1930 – August 15, 2020) was a rear admiral in the United States Navy. He was Chief of the United States Naval Reserve from November 1987 until August 1989. He was an alumnus of the University of Maryland School of Law, and Loyola College in Maryland.

After his retirement in 1989, Smith became director of the United States Navy Memorial in Washington, D.C. Later in life, he moved to The Woodlands, Texas, with his wife Virginia Elizabeth "Ginny" Smith, a retired Navy nurse. Smith had married the former Virginia Elizabeth "Ginger" Thompson on August 6, 1955, at the Charleston Naval Base chapel.
