= Perry G. Smith Sr. =

United States Army general

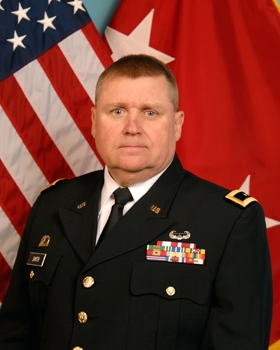
- Born: April 27, 1949 (age 77)
- Military career
- Allegiance: United States
- Branch: United States Army, Alabama National Guard
- Service years: 1973–2008, 2011–2017
- Rank: Major general

Perry G. Smith Sr. (born April 27, 1949) is Alabama's former Adjutant general.

== Education ==
Smith attended Auburn University and was commissioned as second lieutenant through its Army ROTC program in 1973. He received a Bachelor of Science degree in biochemistry. He attended Troy University, where he received a master's degree in human resource management.

== Career ==
Smith served in the Alabama Army National Guard from 1975 to 2008. He later served as Adjutant General from 2011 to 2017.
