= USS Menifee =

Haskell-class attack transport

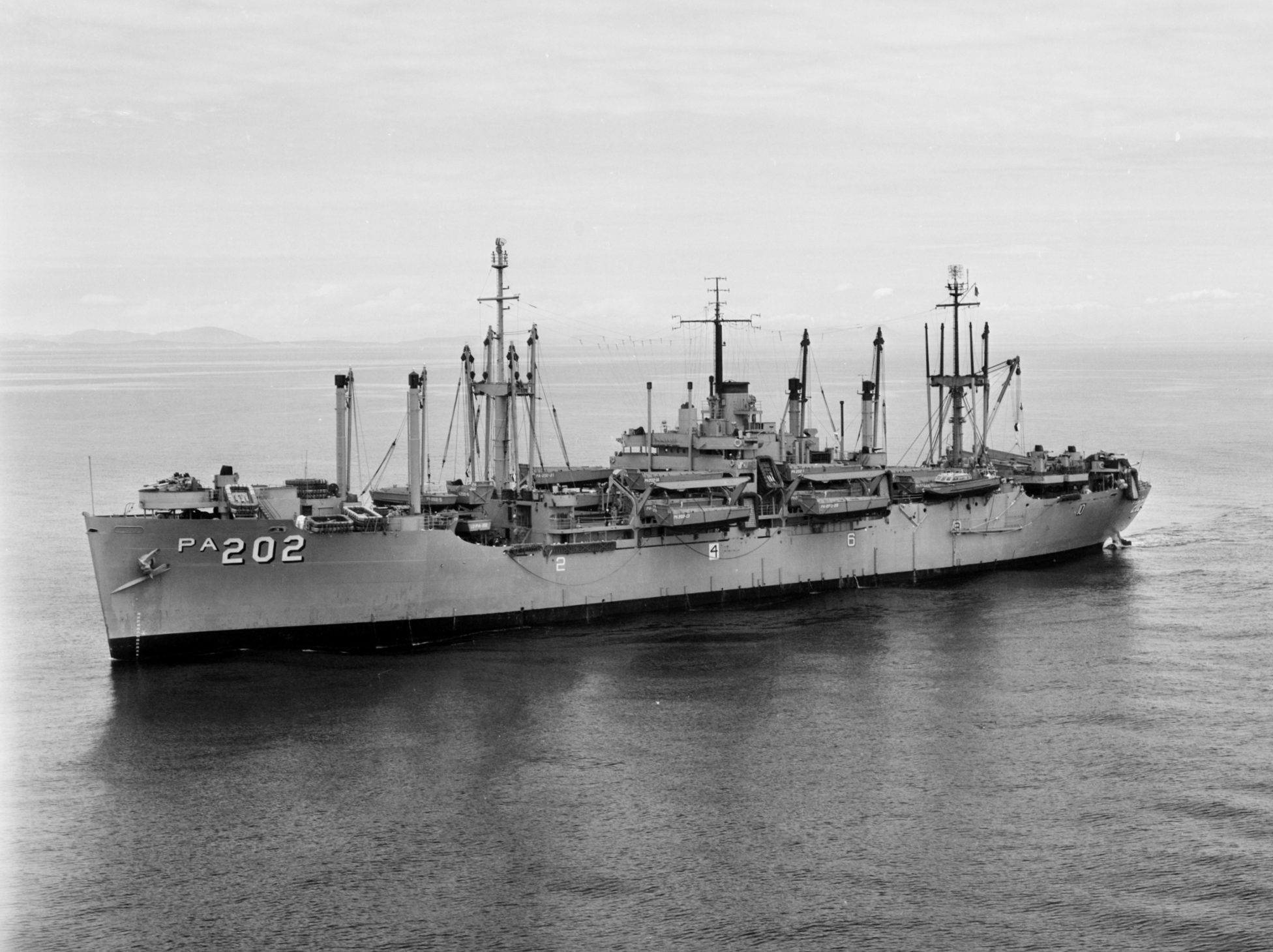

History

United States
- Name: USS Menifee (APA-202)
- Namesake: Menifee County, Kentucky
- Builder: Kaiser Shipbuilding
- Yard number: MCV No. 670
- Laid down: 21 July 1944
- Launched: 15 October 1944
- Sponsored by: Mrs Lucien Garon
- Acquired: 4 November 1944
- Commissioned: 4 November 1944
- Decommissioned: 31 July 1946
- Recommissioned: 2 December 1950
- Decommissioned: 29 June 1955
- Stricken: 1 October 1955
- Honours and awards: One battle star for World War II service and two battle stars for Korea service
- Fate: Sold for scrapping 28 May 1975

General characteristics
- Class & type: Haskell-class attack transport
- Displacement: 6,873 t.(lt) 14,837 t (fl)
- Length: 455 ft
- Beam: 62 ft
- Draft: 24 ft
- Propulsion: 1 x Allis-Chalmers geared turbine, 2 x Combustion Engineering header-type boilers, 1 x propeller, designed shaft horsepower 8,500
- Speed: 18 knots
- Boats & landing craft carried: 2 x LCM, 12 x LCVP, 3 x LCPU
- Capacity: 86 Officers 1,475 Enlisted
- Crew: 56 Officers, 480 enlisted
- Armament: 1 x 5"/38 caliber dual-purpose gun mount, 1 x quad 40mm gun mounts, 4 x twin 40mm gun mounts, 10 x single 20mm gun mounts
- Notes: MARCOM hull type VC2-S-AP5

USS Menifee (APA-202) was a Haskell-class attack transport that saw service with the US Navy in World War II and the Korean War.

Menifee was laid down as MCV Hull No. 670 by Kaiser Shipbuilding of Vancouver, Washington on 21 July 1944; launched 15 October 1944, and commissioned 4 November 1944.

== Operational history ==
=== World War II ===
Menifee reported to ComPhibsTraPac for intensive amphibious training 8 December 1944 and within a month was underway for Hawaii with US Navy and Marine personnel and cargo. Unloading her initial cargo and passengers at Honolulu 15 January 1945, she departed for the South Pacific on the 27th. On 5 February, she arrived at Guadalcanal for further training exercises in preparation for the Okinawa campaign.

==== Invasion of Okinawa ====
On 1 April, Menifee arrived in the transport area off Okinawa with cargo and units of the 6th Marine Division on board. Remaining in the area through the 4th, she landed her troops during the first 2 days and discharged her cargo on the 3d and 4th. On the 5th, she got underway for the United States, arriving at San Francisco 11 May to take on Army personnel and cargo bound for the Philippines.

By 19 June, Menifee had discharged her passengers and cargo at Leyte and was underway for a quick cargo run to Milne Bay, New Guinea. Upon her return from the Netherlands East Indies, she headed back to California, arriving San Pedro 2 August.

==== After hostilities ====
After the cessation of hostilities in the Pacific, Menifee continued ferrying occupation troops to Japan and war-weary veterans back to the United States. Released from Magic Carpet duty in early 1946, she reported to the 19th Fleet 9 March and upon decommissioning 31 July, was berthed at Stockton.

=== Korean War ===
With the outbreak of hostilities in Korea, Menifee was retrieved from the "mothball fleet" and recommissioned 2 December 1950. Assigned once more to the Amphibious Force, Pacific Fleet, she completed two extended tours of duty in the western Pacific before inactivating a second time in 1955. From April 1951 to March 1952, Menifee ferried troops between Japan and Korea and within Korean waters, insuring through her mobility, the distribution of U.N. forces according to need. During her second WestPac deployment, August 1953 to April 1954, she took part in extensive amphibious training exercises with American and Korean Marines and served as flagship for Operation "Big Lift", the transfer of neutral Indian troops to the peace conference in Panmunjom.

=== Decommissioning ===
On 29 June 1955, Menifee was placed out of commission in reserve, assigned to the San Francisco Group, Pacific Reserve Fleet. She was struck from the Navy Vessel Register 1 October and transferred to the Maritime Commission. In 1969, she was berthed at Suisun Bay in the National Defense Reserve Fleet. She was sold for scrapping on 28 May 1975.

=== Decorations ===
Menifee received one battle star for World War II service and two for Korean service.
