= Steve Schmidt (New Hampshire politician) =

American politician

Member of New Hampshire House of Representatives for Carroll 6
- In office 2010–2018
- Succeeded by: John MacDonald

Personal details
- Party: Republican

Stephen "Steve" J. Schmidt is an American politician. He was a member of the New Hampshire House of Representatives and represented Carroll's 6th district.
