= Stephen J Smith (physiologist) =

American medical academic

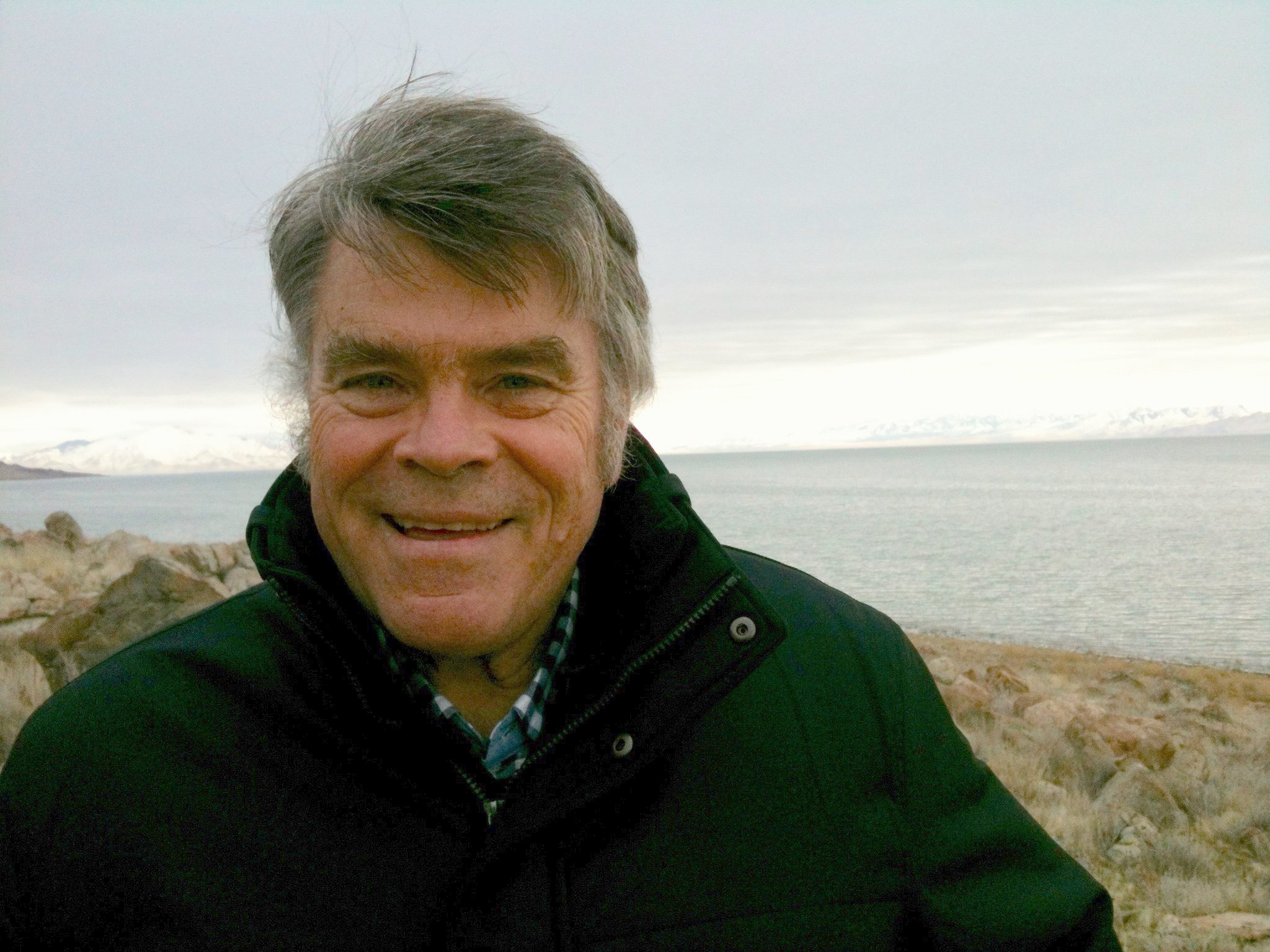

Stephen J Smith is Meritorious Investigator at the Allen Institute for Brain Science [1] and Emeritus Professor of Molecular and Cellular Physiology at Stanford University [2]. He held faculty and Howard Hughes Medical Institute positions at the Yale University School of Medicine 1980-1989. He served 1990-2014 as a Stanford Professor, teaching many courses in synaptic physiology and cellular microscopy while mentoring many students and fellows [3]. He also taught in many expert workshops and summer courses at the Woods Hole Marine Biological Laboratory and the Cold Spring Harbor Laboratory.

== Education ==
Smith earned a 1970 Reed College B.A. and a 1977 Ph.D. from the University of Washington, mentored there by Profs. Charles F. Stevens and Wolfhard Almers. Smith was a Miller Research Fellow 1977-1980 at the University of California Berkeley with Robert S. Zucker.

== Research ==
Prof. Smith's 147 neuroscience and cell biology research publications to date are documented on his Stanford faculty profile page [2]. Some publications that have generated particularly wide and sustained attention are highlighted here, along with citation histories and perspectives from other authors.

Smith's doctoral, fellowship and early faculty research pioneered the exploration of neuronal calcium dynamics. He developed an innovative theory for activity-dependent intracellular calcium dynamics then solved hard tool-building problems to test that theory empirically [4]. The new tools were then used to make the first measurements of calcium dynamics in a vertebrate neuron [5] and the first spatial mapping of a presynaptic calcium signal [6]. Those same new tools empowered a 1985 collaborative discovery that activation of NMDA-type glutamate receptor-channels permits an influx calcium ions [7], a signal at the heart of many or most of today's synaptic plasticity models [7].

In the late 1980's, Smith's laboratory leveraged Roger Tsien's new fluo-3-AM dye to pioneer high-frame-rate video methods for imaging calcium dynamics. In 1990, his Yale laboratory published an article demonstrating that astrocytes were capable of a form of long-distance signaling which they called "calcium waves" and which transformed much thinking about neuroglial cell biology [8].

Smith's Stanford laboratory more recently adapted William Betz' FM 1-43 dye innovation to make the first mammalian central nervous system measurements of presynaptic function at the single-synapse [9] and single-vesicle [10] levels. The group also invented a powerful histology method, called "array tomography" to enable pioneering explorations of presynaptic molecular architectures [11] at single-synapse and ultrastructural levels.
