= Jeremiah O'Brien =

American military officer (1744–1818)

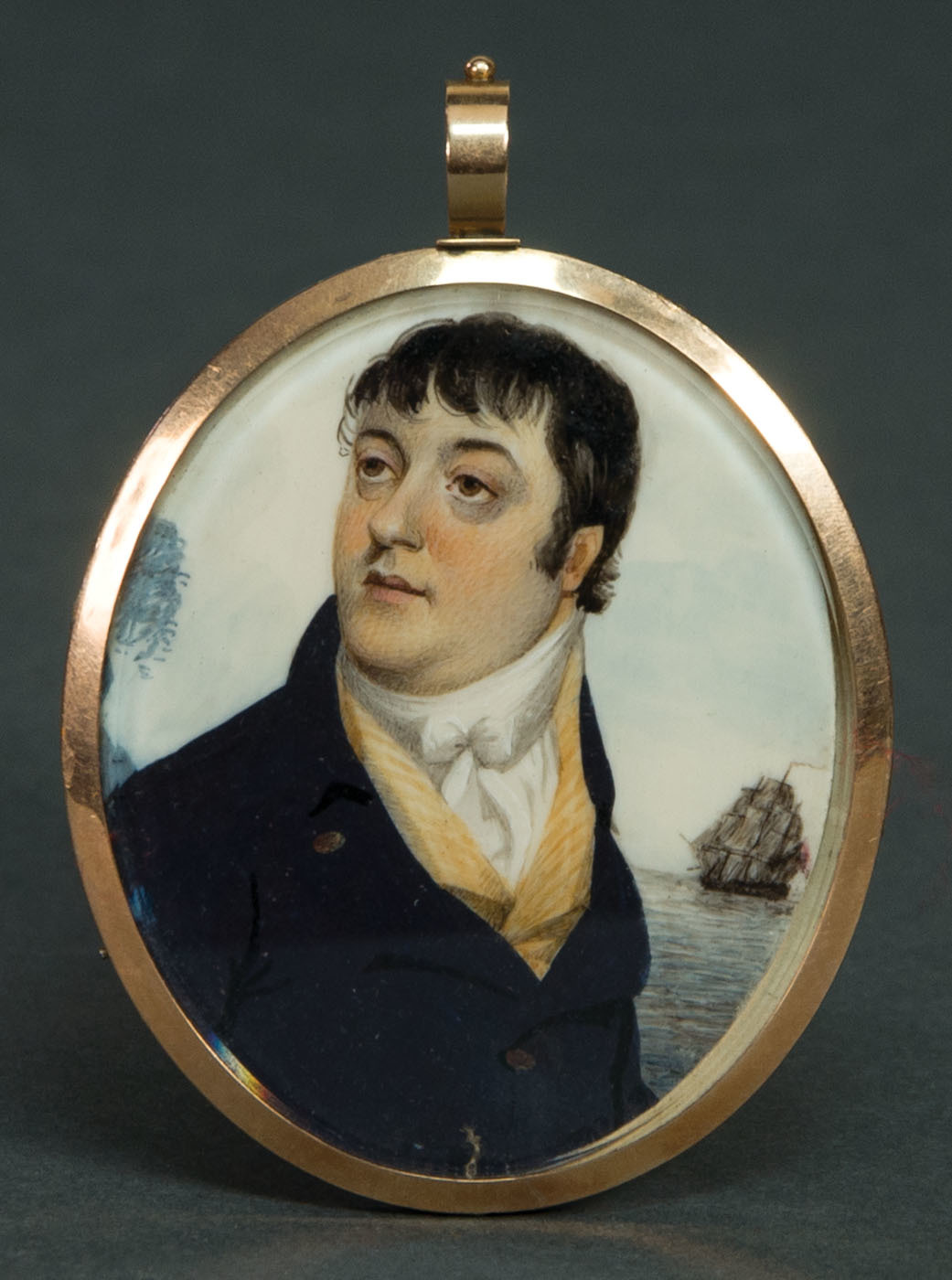
- Miniature portrait of O'Brien
- Born: 1744; Kittery, Massachusetts
- Died: September 5, 1818 (aged 74–75) Machias, Maine
- Buried: O'Brien Cemetery, Machias
- Allegiance: United States
- Branch: Massachusetts State Navy; Massachusetts Militia
- Rank: Captain (Massachusetts State Navy); Colonel (Massachusetts Militia)
- Conflicts: American Revolutionary War; Battle of Machias; Raid on Saint John

Jeremiah O'Brien (1744 – September 5, 1818) was an American military officer who served in the American Revolutionary War. Born in Kittery, Massachusetts, he captured the British schooner HMS Margaretta in the Battle of Machias, renaming her Machias Liberty before leading the successful raid on Saint John. O'Brien was subsequently commissioned into the Massachusetts State Navy at the rank of captain, though he was captured by the British in 1780 and imprisoned in England. Escaping to France and then to North America, O'Brien was commissioned as colonel into the Massachusetts Militia. Six ships have been named in his honor.

== Early life ==
Jeremiah, the eldest son of Irish immigrants Morris and Mary O'Brien, was born in 1744 in Kittery, Province of Massachusetts Bay. His family later moved to Scarborough before settling in Machias during the 1760s, where they owned two sawmills and engaged in the lumber industry.

== American Revolution ==
Reports of the battles of Lexington and Concord reached Machias by early May 1775, leading Jeremiah and Benjamin Foster to rally Machias residents at Job Burnham's tavern. Machias merchant captain Ichabod Jones sailed his ships Unity and Polly to Boston with a cargo of lumber and purchased food for sale in Machias. British troops encouraged Jones to deliver another cargo of lumber for construction of their barracks in Boston. Admiral Samuel Graves ordered HMS Margaretta, under the command of James Moore, to accompany Jones' ships to discourage interference from Machias rebels. When the ships reached Machias on 2 June 1775, Capt. James Moore saw the town's liberty pole and ordered it removed. The Machias townspeople refused to remove the pole and to load the lumber. Foster plotted to capture the British officers when they attended church on 11 June, but the British escaped capture and retreated downriver aboard Margaretta. On 12 June Jeremiah pursued Margaretta aboard Jones' ship the Unity. Foster intended to participate on the packet boat Falmouth. But after the Falmouth ran aground, O'Brien and his five brothers, Gideon, John, William, Dennis and Joseph, and men of Machias took the Unity and went on alone.

Under the command of Jeremiah O'Brien, thirty-one townsmen sailed aboard Unity armed with guns, swords, axes, and pitch forks and captured Margaretta in an hour-long battle after Capt. Moore of the Margaretta had threatened to bombard the town. John O'Brien jumped aboard Margaretta as the two ships closed, but was forced to jump overboard by the British crew. After rescuing John, the Unity again closed on the Margaretta until their rigging became entangled. The Unity was bombarded by grenades from the British ship, but Margaretta surrendered after James Moore was mortally wounded.

This battle is often considered the first time British colors were struck to those of the United States, even though the Continental Navy did not exist at the time. The United States Merchant Marine claims Unity as its member and this incident as their beginning. In August 1775, O'Brien participated in the raid on St. John. He continued as the captain of Unity, renamed Machias Liberty, for two years, and received the first captain's commission in the Massachusetts State Navy in 1775. He met with General George Washington more than once.

== Later life ==
President James Madison appointed O'Brien as the federal customs collector for the port of Machias in 1811, a position he held until his death in 1818.

== Honors ==
- Five ships in the United States Navy have been named in his honor:
  - USS O'Brien (TB-30), a torpedo boat, built in 1900 and served until 1909
  - USS O'Brien (DD-51), an O'Brien-class destroyer, which served from 1915 until 1922
  - USS O'Brien (DD-415), a Sims-class destroyer, served from 1940 until she was sunk by an enemy torpedo in 1942
  - USS O'Brien (DD-725), an Allen M. Sumner-class destroyer, served from 1944 until 1972
  - USS O'Brien (DD-975), a Spruance-class destroyer, launched in 1976 and served until 2004
- In World War II, the United States Liberty ship SS Jeremiah O'Brien was named in his honor., an EC2-S-C1-class Liberty ship, which served during World War II from 1943 until 1946 and is currently an operational museum ship in San Francisco
- Bangor and Aroostook Railroad bicentennial locomotive number 1776 was named Jeremiah O'Brien

== See also ==
- Irish military diaspora
