= Steven G. Smith =

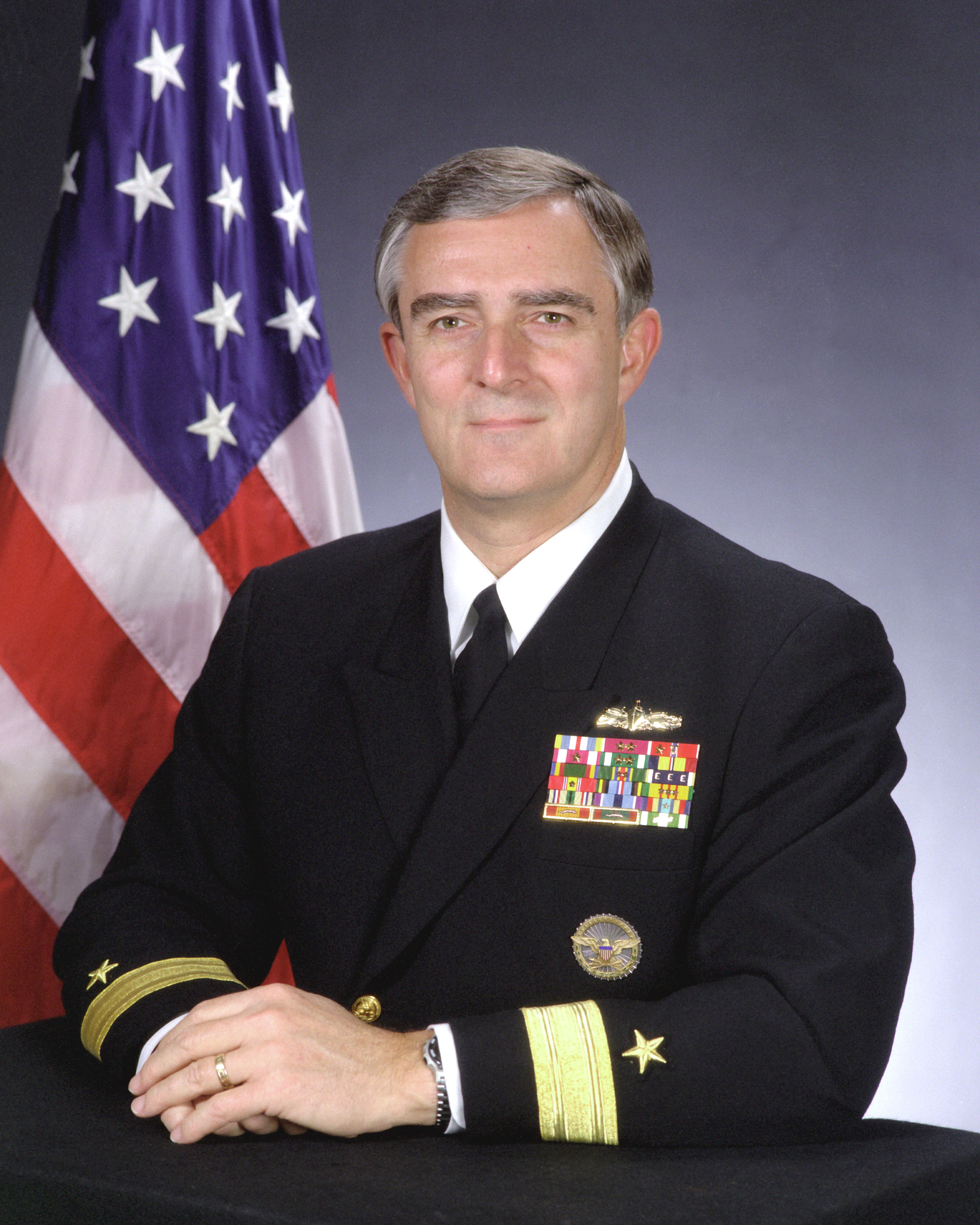
Rear Adm. Smith in 1997

Steven Grayson Smith (born 3 August 1946), is a former United States Navy Rear Admiral. He ended his military career in January 2003 after 34 years. Smith received the Defense Distinguished Service Medal, Navy Distinguished Service Medal, two Defense Superior Service Medals, four awards of the Legion of Merit and two Bronze Star Medals with Combat "V".

== Personal ==
In the 2024 United States presidential election, Smith endorsed Kamala Harris.
