= Steve Smith (general) =

Senior officer in the Australian Army Reserve

Steven Smith
- Born: Hobart, Tasmania
- Military career
- Allegiance: Australia
- Branch: Australian Army Reserve
- Service years: 1976–2020
- Rank: Major General
- Commands: 2nd Division; 9th Brigade; The Royal Tasmania Regiment
- Conflicts: Iraq War
- Awards: Member of the Order of Australia; Conspicuous Service Cross; Knight of the Order of St John; Reserve Force Decoration; Officer of the Legion of Merit (United States)
- Other work: Chairman of the Board of St John Ambulance Tasmania

Major General Steven Lyndon Smith AM, CSC, RFD is a retired senior officer in the Australian Army Reserve. His career includes command at Battalion, Brigade and Divisional levels.

== Military career ==
Smith joined the Australian Army Reserve as a soldier in 1976 and was commissioned into The Royal Australian Infantry Corps in 1979. He has served with the 40th Independent Rifle Company, The Royal Tasmania Regiment, the 4th Battalion, The Royal New South Wales Regiment and has held a range of other senior staff and training appointments. He was awarded the Conspicuous Service Cross in 2001 for "outstanding achievement" as the Commanding Officer of the 12th/40th Battalion, The Royal Tasmania Regiment.

In 2006 Smith was promoted to the rank of brigadier and appointed the assistant commander of the 1st Division and Deployable Joint Force Headquarters. He subsequently deployed to Iraq, serving as the Commanding General of the Joint Headquarters Transition Team (JHQ-TT) within the US led Multi-National Security Transition Command - Iraq. For his service as the Assistant Commander of the 1st Division, Commander of the 9th Brigade and Commanding General of the JHQ-TT, Smith was appointed as a Member of the Order of Australia in 2010.

Smith was promoted to major general in 2012 and appointed as the Commander of the Australian Army's 2nd Division, which consists of the majority of the Australian Army Reserve. He concluded this appointment on 31 December 2014 and retired from the Australian Army in 2020.

== Education and civil career ==
Smith is a graduate of the Australian Command and Staff College – Reserve, and holds a Bachelor of Arts from the University of Tasmania and a Graduate Certificate in Emergency Management from the Australian Emergency Management Institute.

Smith previously worked for the Tasmanian Government as a career public servant specialising in emergency management across multiple domains. Following his retirement, he was an emergency management consultant, was the Chairman of the Board of Directors of St John Ambulance Tasmania and is the Colonel Commandant of The Royal Tasmania Regiment. He was made a Knight of the Order of St John in 2024.

Military offices
Preceded by Major General Craig Williams	Commander 2nd Division; 2012–2014	Succeeded by Major General Stephen Porter
