= Battle of Gloucester (1775) =

Skirmish in the American Revolutionary War at Gloucester, Massachusetts

- Part of the American Revolutionary War
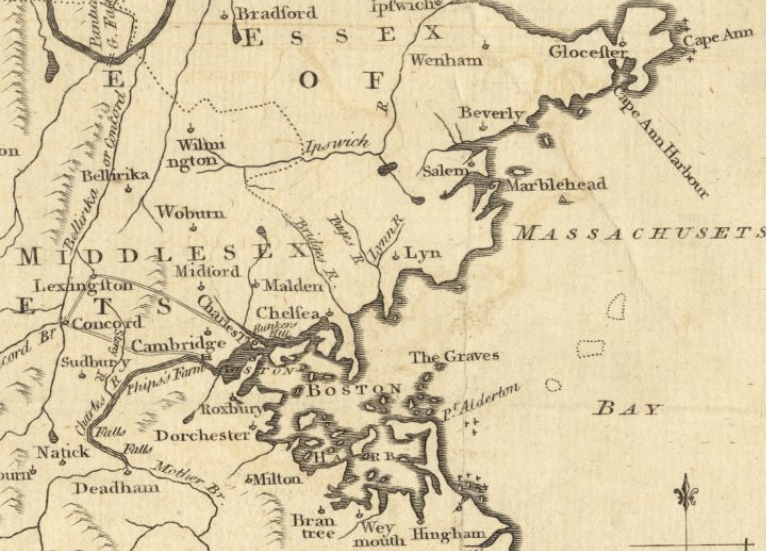
- Detail from a 1775 map showing Boston, Cape Ann and Gloucester harbor. Gloucester Harbor is labelled "Cape Ann Harbour".
Date	August 8 or 9, 1775
Location	Cape Ann, Massachusetts 42°36′23.12″N 70°39′49.39″W
Result	Massachusetts Bay victory

Belligerents
Massachusetts Bay	Great Britain

Commanders and leaders
Joseph Foster; Bradbury Sanders	John Linzee

Strength
Land: Unknown militia Sea: 2 unarmed schooners	1 sloop-of-war, 3 small boats

Casualties and losses
2 killed 1 wounded	1 killed 4 wounded 24 captured 3 small boats captured 1 sloop-of-war damaged

The Battle of Gloucester was a skirmish fought early in the American Revolutionary War at Gloucester, Massachusetts on August 8 or 9, 1775. Royal Navy Captain John Linzee, commanding the sloop-of-war HMS Falcon, spotted two schooners that were returning from the West Indies. After capturing one schooner, Linzee chased the second one into Gloucester Harbor, where it was grounded. The townspeople called out their militia, captured British seamen sent to seize the grounded schooner, and recovered the captured ship as well.

The skirmish was one of a series of actions that prompted a retaliatory expedition by Royal Navy Captain Henry Mowat in October 1775. The major event of his cruise, the Burning of Falmouth, was cited by the Second Continental Congress when it established the Continental Navy.

== Background ==
In April 1775, tensions between British colonists in the Province of Massachusetts Bay and the royal governor, General Thomas Gage, boiled over into war. When General Gage dispatched troops to Concord to search for military supplies the colonists had stored there, alarms were raised, and colonists and soldiers clashed in Lexington and Concord on April 19. Militia companies continued to arrive in the days following, and the British troops were besieged in Boston.

The siege, which only blockaded land access to the city, made the army dependent on the ability of the navy to supply it with fresh provisions. In many communities near the city, livestock and hay were removed from islands in Boston Harbor and the immediate coastal areas, while General Gage and Vice Admiral Samuel Graves sent out expeditions to raid coastal communities for livestock and hay, and to interdict colonial shipping. When these expeditions landed troops or sailors to round up livestock, they were sometimes met with resistance. Not long after the siege began, colonists and army troops clashed on May 27 near Boston over supplies on a nearby island.

On August 5, HMS Falcon, commanded by John Linzee, appeared off Ipswich Bay. Captain Linzee sent a barge containing about 50 men ashore to secure a supply of mutton from the flock of sheep grazing on the Coffin farm at West Gloucester. Major Coffin observed their movements and anticipated their design. He hastily gathered some half dozen men, armed them with rifles and, concealed behind sand mounds, kept up such a brisk firing that the sailors in the barge, supposing that a large company were ready to receive them, thought it prudent to desist from their sheep foraging intentions and returned to Falcon. When the barge returned to Falcon, Linzee sent it to investigate a schooner in the harbor; this ship turned out to only contain ballast. Linzee continued to cruise off Cape Ann for the next few days, and impressed some men from local ports and ships.

== Battle ==
On August 8 or 9 (sources disagree on the exact date), Captain Linzee spotted two American schooners making sail for Salem around 8am. Quickly capturing one of the schooners without incident, he put a crew aboard the prize before giving chase to the other. The captain of the second schooner, apparently familiar with the area, brought his ship deep into Gloucester Harbor and grounded it near Five Pound Island shortly after noon. Linzee forced a local fisherman to pilot Falcon and the prize schooner to an anchorage in the harbor. He then sent 36 men on three small boats under the command of his lieutenant to take the ship. Among the crews sent were 10 impressed Americans, including four from Gloucester. The arrival of the British ship had caused the townspeople to raise the alarm, and militia companies began to muster, led by their captains, Joseph Foster and Bradbury Sanders. Armed with muskets and two aging swivel guns, they opened fire from the shore at the small boats as they neared the schooner. The British rowed faster, and boarded the grounded schooner, where they were effectively trapped by constant fire from the shore. Linzee, attempting to distract the townspeople, fired Falcon's guns on the town, and eventually sent a landing party to try to burn the town. However, this attempt was unsuccessful, and the party on the grounded schooner continued to be harassed from the shore. The lieutenant was wounded in the action, and he and a few men managed to escape the action in a skiff around 4 pm, leaving Falcon's master in charge. The remaining men on the grounded ship were eventually taken prisoner, including the impressed Americans. By 7 pm, the small boats had all been taken. Linzee then decided to send the prize schooner in to recover his men. Linzee reported his suspicion that the crew of the captured ship took the opportunity to overpower the prize crew, and recovered the vessel. According to Linzee, "After the master was landed I found I could not do him any good, or distress the rebels by firing, therefore I left off."

== Aftermath ==
Linzee's attempt to burn the town as a punishment for resisting his actions was echoed in later naval actions. In October 1775, Admiral Graves ordered Captain Henry Mowat on an expedition of reprisal against New England's coastal communities, specifically including Gloucester as a target, and citing among other justifications Captain Linzee's defeat at Gloucester. Mowat chose not to attack Gloucester, since he felt its buildings were too widely spaced for cannonades to have any significant effect. Reports of Mowat's only major action, the Burning of Falmouth (present-day Portland, Maine), were instrumental in motivating the Second Continental Congress to establish the Continental Navy.
