= List of shipwrecks in 1775 =

The List of shipwrecks in 1775 includes some ships sunk, wrecked or otherwise lost during 1775.

table of contents
1775
Jan	Feb	Mar	Apr
May	Jun	Jul	Aug
Sep	Oct	Nov	Dec
Unknown date

== January ==
=== 11 January ===
List of shipwrecks: 11 January 1775
Ship	State	Description
Flora	Dutch Republic	The ship was wrecked at Saint Ouen, Jersey, Channel Islands with the loss of four of her eleven crew. She was on a voyage from "Barbetia" to Amsterdam.

=== 20 January ===
List of shipwrecks: 20 January 1775
Ship	State	Description
Mermaid	Great Britain	The ship was driven ashore near Dungarvan, County Antrim, Ireland. She was on a voyage from Bristol, Gloucestershire to Waterford, Ireland.

=== 21 January ===
List of shipwrecks: 21 January 1775
Ship	State	Description
Canada	Great Britain	The ship struck rocks at Dartmouth, Devon and sank. She was on a voyage from "Saloe" to Dunkirk, France.

=== 25 January ===
List of shipwrecks: 25 January 1775
Ship	State	Description
Three Brothers	Great Britain	The lugger foundered in the English Channel between Lymington and Christchurch, Hampshire. Her crew were rescued.

=== 26 January ===
List of shipwrecks: 26 January 1775
Ship	State	Description
Elizabeth	Dutch Republic	The ship was wrecked near Dearness, Orkney Islands, Great Britain with some loss of life. She was on a voyage from Rotterdam to Faro, Portugal.

=== 30 January ===
List of shipwrecks: 30 January 1775
Ship	State	Description
Brailov (Браилов)	Imperial Russian Navy	The schooner was driven ashore by ice and wrecked at Akkerman in the mouth of the Dniester. Her crew were rescued. Also mentioned as Berislav (Берислав).

=== Unknown date ===
List of shipwrecks: Unknown date 1775
Ship	State	Description
Adventure	Great Britain	The ship was driven ashore at Liverpool, Lancashire.
Auro	Great Britain	The ship was lost at Madeira.
Betty	Ireland	The ship capsized at Dublin.
Betty Gregg	Ireland	The ship was lost at Madeira with the loss of all hands. She was on a voyage from Cork to New York, British America.
Dartmouth	Great Britain	The ship was in collision with Grosvenor ( British East India Company) in the River Thames at Gravesend, Kent and was severely damaged. Dartmouth was on a voyage from Antigua to London. She was subsequently refloated.
Fame	Great Britain	The ship was driven ashore at Pakefield, Suffolk with the loss of two of her crew.
Favourite	Great Britain	The ship sank at Mahón, Spain. She was on a voyage from Cádiz to Genoa.
Free Trader	Great Britain	The ship was driven ashore and wrecked in the Firth of Forth. She was on a voyage from King's Lynn, Norfolk to Newcastle upon Tyne, Northumberland.
Friends	Great Britain	The ship was driven ashore at Liverpool. She was on a voyage from Georgia, British America to Liverpool.
Lively	Great Britain	The ship foundered in the English Channel off Selsey Island, Sussex.
Magdalen	Great Britain	The ship was lost in the Magdalen Passage.
Manners	Great Britain	The ship was lost at Terceira, Azores.
Nancy	Great Britain	The ship was lost at Stonehaven, Aberdeenshire with the loss of all hands. She was on a voyage from Christiansands, Norway to Aberdeen.
Nancy	Great Britain	The ship was lost near "Vilavioco". She was on a voyage from Dartmouth, Devon to "Vilavioco".
Peggy & Betty	(Kingdom of Great Britain) British America	The ship was wrecked at Madeira. Her crew were rescued.
Spes Nova	Portugal	The ship was wrecked at Madeira with the loss of all but her captain.
St Joseph	Great Britain	The ship was lost in the Windward Passage.
Vrouw Maria	Dutch Republic	The ship was wrecked on the Goodwin Sands, Kent, Great Britain. She was on a voyage from Cádiz, Spain to Ostend.
William & Margaret	Great Britain	The ship was driven ashore on Muhu, Russia. She was on a voyage from Memel, Prussia to London.

== February ==
=== 3 February ===
List of shipwrecks: 3 February 1775
Ship	State	Description
Three Friends	Great Britain	The ship was run down and sunk in the North Sea off Orfordness, Suffolk by William & Mary (Great Britain). Three Friends was on a voyage from Hull, Yorkshire.

=== 4 February ===
List of shipwrecks: 4 February 1775
Ship	State	Description
Weddel	Great Britain	The ship ran aground off the Isles of Scilly. She was refloated the next day and beached at St Mary's.

=== 15 February ===
List of shipwrecks: 15 February 1775
Ship	State	Description
HMS Halifax	Royal Navy	American Revolution:The patrol schooner was run on the rocks by a pilot off Machias, Maine in a gale at 3 A.M.. She broke up in another gale and snowstorm that evening.

=== Unknown date ===
List of shipwrecks: Unknown date 1775
Ship	State	Description
Albion	Great Britain	The ship was wrecked on the coast of Ireland. she was on a voyage from Whitehaven, Cumberland to Grenada.
Dublin	Ireland	The ship was driven ashore and wrecked at Ballywater, County Wexford. She was on a voyage from Whitehaven, Cumberland, Great Britain to Dublin
Expedition	Great Britain	The ship was lost at Tenerife, Canary Islands.
Friendship	Great Britain	The ship was driven ashore at Ballywater.
Giddes	Great Britain	The ship was lost on the coast of Ireland. She was on a voyage from Maryland, British America to Liverpool, Lancashire.
Isaac	Great Britain	The ship was driven ashore and wrecked at Ballywater. She was on a voyage from Whitehaven to Dublin.
John & William	Great Britain	The ship was driven ashore at Ballywater.
Juno	Great Britain	The ship was driven ashore and wrecked at Mockbeggar, Cheshire. She was on a voyage from Virginia, British America to Liverpool.
Nancy	Great Britain	The ship was lost on the Scottish coast. She was on a voyage from London to Liverpool.
Polly	Ireland	The ship was lost at Youghall, County Cork. She was on a voyage from Newfoundland, British America to Waterford.
Sam	Great Britain	The ship was driven ashore and wrecked near Holyhead, Anglesey. She was on a voyage from Philadelphia, Pennsylvania, British America to Liverpool.
Three Good Friends	Great Britain	The ship struck a rock and sank in the English Channel off Sark, Channel Islands. She was on a voyage from London to Africa and British America.
Union	Great Britain	The ship was driven ashore on the south coast of the Isle of Wight. Her crew were rescued. She was on a voyage from London to South Carolina, British America. Union was later refloated and taken in to Portsmouth, Hampshire for repairs.
William	Great Britain	The ship foundered in the Bristol Channel. She was on a voyage from Maryland, British America to Bristol, Gloucestershire.
William & Thomas	Great Britain	The ship sank in the River Thames at London Bridge. She was on a voyage from London to Pool, Dorset.

== March ==
=== 4 March ===
List of shipwrecks: 4 March 1775
Ship	State	Description
Ceres	Great Britain	The ship was driven ashore near Lymington, Hampshire. She was on a voyage from Southampton, Hampshire to Guernsey, Channel Islands. She was later refloated and taken in to Southampton.

=== 11 March ===
List of shipwrecks: 11 March 1775
Ship	State	Description
Good-Intent	Great Britain	The ship was driven ashore at South Foreland, Kent. She was refloated and taken in to Ramsgate, Kent where she sank. Good-Intent was on a voyage from British Honduras to London.

=== 19 March ===
List of shipwrecks: 19 March 1775
Ship	State	Description
Espiritu Sancto	Spain	The snow was wrecked on Anegada, Virgin Islands. Her crew were rescued. She was on a voyage from A Coruña to Havana, Cuba.

=== 29 March ===
List of shipwrecks: 29 March 1775
Ship	State	Description
Richard & Hannah	Great Britain	The ship was driven ashore and wrecked on Læsø. Denmark. She was on a voyage from Isefjord to an English port.

=== Unknown date ===
List of shipwrecks: Unknown date 1775
Ship	State	Description
Atlanta	Ireland	The ship foundered in the Atlantic Ocean off São Miguel Island, Azores. She was on a voyage from Cork to Sint Eustatius.
Catharina Margritta	Sweden	The ship was lost near Stavanger, Norway. She was on a voyage from Gothenburg to Tenerife, Canary Islands.
Fanny	Great Britain	The ship was lost at Memel, Prussia.
John & Mary	Great Britain	The ship was lost near Pillau, Prussia. She was on a voyage from Königsberg, Prussia to Hull, Yorkshire.
Lovely Jane	Ireland	The ship struck a rock off Arklow, County Wicklow and was abandoned by her crew. She was on a voyage from Dublin to Livorno, Grand Duchy of Tuscany.
Mary	Sweden	The ship sank at Dunkirk, France. She was on a voyage from Gothenburg to Madeira.
Richard	Great Britain	The ship was driven ashore and wrecked on the Isle of Skye. Her crew were rescued. She was on a voyage from Liverpool, Lancashire to Riga, Russia.

== April ==
=== 3 April ===
List of shipwrecks: 3 April 1775
Ship	State	Description
Johnson	Great Britain	The ship was driven ashore in Bootle Bay. She was on a voyage from Liverpool, Lancashire to Maryland, British America. Johnson was later refloated.

=== 6 April ===
List of shipwrecks: 6 April 1775
Ship	State	Description
Liverpool	Great Britain	The ship foundered in the Irish Sea. She was on a voyage from London to Liverpool, Lancashire.

=== 25 April ===
List of shipwrecks: 25 April 1775
Ship	State	Description
Middleburgs Hoop	Dutch Republic	The ship was driven ashore on the south coast of the Isle of Wight, Great Britain. She was on a voyage from Essequibo to Middleburg.

=== Unknown date ===
List of shipwrecks: Unknown date 1775
Ship	State	Description
Dispatch	Great Britain	The ship was lost near Holyhead, Anglesey. She was on a voyage from Bristol, Gloucestershire to Newry, County Antrim, Ireland.
Dispatch	Great Britain	The ship was wrecked on the coast of Norway.
Hawke	Great Britain	The ship was wrecked off the Île d'Oléron, France. She was on a voyage from Chester, Cheshire to La Rochelle, France.
Polly	Great Britain	The ship sank at Dublin, Ireland.
Young Christian	Great Britain	The ship was driven ashore at "Drackon". She was on a voyage from Stettin to London.

== May ==
=== 18 May ===
List of shipwrecks: 18 May 1775
Ship	State	Description
Five Batteaux	Great Britain	American Revolutionary War:The five Batteaux were captured and destroyed by Col. Benedict Arnold's Patriot troops at St. Johns on Lake Champlain.

=== Unknown date ===
List of shipwrecks: Unknown date 1775
Ship	State	Description
Betty	Great Britain	The ship was driven ashore and wrecked on the coast of Zealand, Denmark.
Mary and Elizabeth	Great Britain	The ship ran aground in the Weser and was wrecked.

== June ==
=== 11 June ===
List of shipwrecks: 11 June 1775
Ship	State	Description
"Polly"	United States	American Revolution: Battle of Machias: The vessel, captured by local Militia from the British, was run aground and abandoned in a fight with HMS Margaretta (Royal Navy) at Mathias, Massachusetts.

=== 16 June ===
List of shipwrecks: 16 June 1775
Ship	State	Description
HMS Diana	Royal Navy	American Revolution:The sloop, a tender to HMS Rose, was run ashore at No Point on Connanicott Island when attacked by Katy (Rhode Island Navy).

=== Unknown date ===
List of shipwrecks: Unknown date 1775
Ship	State	Description
Minerva	Great Britain	The ship departed from Bude, Cornwall for Amsterdam, Dutch Republic. No further trace, presumed foundered with the loss of all hands.
St Joaquim e St Rita	Spain	The ship was abandoned in the Mediterranean Sea. She was boarded by some Moors and taken in to Tangier, Morocco.
William & Mary	Great Britain	The ship was driven ashore near Cape San Antonio, Cuba. She was on a voyage from Jamaica to London.

== July ==
=== 2 July ===
List of shipwrecks: 2 July 1775
Ship	State	Description
Comte de St. Germain	France	The ship was wrecked on a reef between Juan de Nova Island and St Christopher Island. She was on a voyage from L'Orient to Pondicherry, India.

=== 31 July ===
List of shipwrecks: 31 July 1775
Ship	State	Description
Gill	Great Britain	The ship foundered in the Atlantic Ocean off Montserrat during a hurricane. She was on a voyage from Sint Eustatius to Saint Vinent.

=== Unknown date ===
List of shipwrecks: Unknown date 1775
Ship	State	Description
Jenny	Great Britain	The ship was driven ashore near Elsinore, Norway.
Unity	Great Britain	The ship was lost at Memel, Prussia.

== August ==
=== 10 August ===
List of shipwrecks: 10 August 1775
Ship	State	Description
Expectation	Great Britain	The ship was wrecked on Long Island, in the Windward Passage.

=== 21 August ===
List of shipwrecks: 21 August 1775
Ship	State	Description
Jamaica Planter	Great Britain	The ship foundered in the Gulf of Florida. Her crew were rescued. She was on a voyage from Jamaica to Bristol, Gloucestershire.

=== 25 August ===
List of shipwrecks: 25 August 1775
Ship	State	Description
Duncannon Paquet	Great Britain	The ship was driven ashore and wrecked on Barbados. Her crew were rescued. She was on a voyage from Falmouth, Cornwall to the West Indies.
Vestal	Great Britain	The ship was lost driven ashore and wrecked on Barbados. She was on a voyage from Newfoundland, British America to Barbados.

=== 28 August ===
List of shipwrecks: 28 August 1775
Ship	State	Description
L'Esperance	France	The ship was driven ashore and wrecked at Saint-Domingue.
Sally	(Kingdom of Great Britain) British America	The sloop was driven ashore and wrecked on the coast of North Carolina. She was on a voyage from Antigua to Connecticut.

=== Unknown date ===
List of shipwrecks: Unknown date 1775
Ship	State	Description
HMS Actaeon	(Kingdom of Great Britain) Royal Navy	The Enterprise-class frigate ran aground at Lymington, Hampshire. She was refloated on 31 August and taken in to Portsmouth, Hampshire for repairs.
Albion	Great Britain	The ship was driven ashore and severely damaged near Hoylake, Cheshire. She was on a voyage from Philadelphia, Pennsylvania, British America to Liverpool, Lancashire.
Duke of York	Great Britain	The ship departed from a port in North Carolina, British America for Whitehaven, Cumberland. No further trace, presumed foundered with the loss of all hands.
Le Deux Frères	France	The ship was lost at Rouen. She was on a voyage from Bordeaux to Rouen.
Ruperbaan	flag unknown	The ship was run down and sunk in the Kattegat off Anholt, Denmark.

== September ==
=== 2 September ===
List of shipwrecks: 2 September 1775
Ship	State	Description
Good-Intent	Great Britain	The ship was sighted off Beaufort, North Carolina, British America. No further trace, presumed foundered in the Atlantic Ocean with the loss of all hands. She was on a voyage from London to North Carolina.
HMS Mercury	(Kingdom of Great Britain) Royal Navy	The sixth rate was driven ashore in a hurricane at Norfolk, Virginia, British America.
Molly	Great Britain	The ship was driven ashore at Jamaice during a hurricane. She was on a voyage from Virginia, British America to London.
Nancy	Great Britain	The ship foundered in the Atlantic Ocean off the coast of Maryland, British America.

=== 4 September ===
List of shipwrecks: 4 September 1775
Ship	State	Description
Minerva	Ireland	The ship was lost off the Virginia Capes, British America.

=== 5 September ===
List of shipwrecks: 5 September 1775
Ship	State	Description
Pobeda (Победа, 'Victory')	Imperial Russian Navy	The frigate was driven ashore and wrecked near Balaklava. All on board were rescued.

=== 11 September ===
List of shipwrecks: 11 September 1775
Ship	State	Description
Ann	Great Britain	The ship was driven ashore at Newfoundland, British America. She was later refloated.
Arthur and Betty	Great Britain	The ship was driven ashore at Newfoundland. She was later refloated.
Betsey	Great Britain	The ship foundered in the Bay of Bulls, Newfoundland.
Betty	Great Britain	The ship was driven ashore and wrecked at Newfoundland with the loss of all bt two of her crew.
Eagle	Great Britain	The ship was driven ashore in the Bay of Bulls. She was later refloated.
Henry and Honora	Great Britain	The ship foundered in the Bay of Bulls.
Olive Branch	Great Britain	The ship was driven ashore on Newfoundland. She was later refloated.
Palliser	Great Britain	The ship was driven ashore in the Bay of Bulls. She was later refloated.
St Francis	Great Britain	The ship was driven ashore on the coast of Newfoundland. She was later refloated.
William	Great Britain	The ship was driven ashore and wrecked on the coast of Newfoundland.
William & Mary	Great Britain	The ship was driven ashore on the coast of Newfoundland.

=== 12 September ===
List of shipwrecks: 12 September 1775
Ship	State	Description
Ann	Great Britain	The ship was driven ashore and wrecked in Temple Bay, Newfoundland, British America.
Betsey	Great Britain	The ship was driven ashore in Temple Bay.
Jersey	Great Britain	The ship was driven ashore and wrecked on the north west coast of Newfoundland.
Johannes	Great Britain	The ship was driven ashore and wrecked on the north west coast of Newfoundland.
John and Betty	Great Britain	The ship was driven ashore and wrecked on the north west coast of Newfoundland.
Josepha	Great Britain	The ship was driven ashore and wrecked on the north west coast of Newfoundland.
Molly	Great Britain	The ship was driven ashore and wrecked on the north west coast of Newfoundland.
Pinson	Great Britain	The ship was driven ashore in Temple Bay.
Triton	Great Britain	The ship was driven ashore and wrecked on the north west coast of Newfoundland.

=== 27 September ===
List of shipwrecks: 27 September 1775
Ship	State	Description
Brothers	(Kingdom of Great Britain) British America	The ship was driven ashore on the coast of Maryland. She was on a voyage from Maryland to London, Great Britain.

=== Unknown date ===
List of shipwrecks: Unknown date 1775
Ship	State	Description
Ancona	Papal States	The galley was driven ashore in the Baltic. She was on a voyage from Saint Petersburg, Russia to Ancona.
Baltic	Great Britain	The ship was driven ashore and wrecked on Bornholm, Denmark. She was on a voyage from Memel, Prussia to Great Yarmouth, Norfolk.
Betsey	Great Britain	The ship foundered in the Atlantic Ocean off Cape St. Mary's, Newfoundland, British America in late September. Four of her crew drowned.
Charming Sally	Great Britain	The ship capsized at Cork, Ireland and was wrecked.
Elizabeth	Great Britain	The ship was wrecked on the Norwegian coast.
Gustaff	(Denmark) Norway	The ship was lost 12 nautical miles (22 km) from Bergen with the loss of three of her crew. She was on a voyage from London, Great Britain to Bergen and Norrköping.
London	Great Britain	The ship was driven ashore at York Town, Virginia, British America. She was later refloated.
Phenix	Great Britain	The ship was lost at Reneans, Newfoundland.
Redmaiden	Great Britain	The ship was lost at Newfoundland after 12 September.

== October ==
=== 10 October ===
List of shipwrecks: 10 October 1775
Ship	State	Description
"Unity"	United States	American Revolution: The privateer ran aground in a fight with HMS Nautius near Beverly, Massachusetts. Later refloated.

=== 13 October ===
List of shipwrecks: 13 October 1775
Ship	State	Description
Fanny	Great Britain	The ship was driven ashore at Saint Kitts.
Mally	Great Britain	The ship was driven ashore and wrecked on Saint Kitts.

=== 16 October ===
List of shipwrecks: 16 October 1775
Ship	State	Description
"Rebecca & Francis"	Great Britain	American Revolutionary War:The transport went ashore at Brigantine Beach, New Jersey. Crew captured by Militia and vessel destroyed.

=== 17 October ===
List of shipwrecks: 17 October 1775
Ship	State	Description
Longbrook	Great Britain	The ship was driven ashore in Whitsand Bay, Devon. She was later refloated.

=== 19 October ===
List of shipwrecks: 19 October 1775
Ship	State	Description
Alice	Great Britain	The ship was driven ashore and wrecked near Sandwich, Kent. She was on a voyage from London to Dublin, Ireland.
Betty	Great Britain	The ship was driven ashore and wrecked at Hoylake, Cheshire. She was on a voyage from Livorno, Grand Duchy of Tuscany to Liverpool, Lancashire
Carnarvon	Great Britain	The ship was driven ashore and wrecked in Pwllheli Bay. She was on a voyage from London to Carnarvon.
Cornwall Paquet	Great Britain	The ship was wrecked near Dungarvan, County Waterford, Ireland. She was on a voyage from Southampton, Hampshire to Cork, Ireland.
Mary	Great Britain	The ship was driven ashore and wrecked near Sandwich. She was on a voyage from Perth to Gibraltar.
Success	Great Britain	The ship was driven ashore and wrecked near Sandwich. She was on a voyage from Saint Petersburg to Barcelona, Spain.
Thomas	Great Britain	The ship was run into in The Downs and then driven ashore and wrecked at Ramsgate, Kent. She was on a voyage from the Bay of Honduras and Musquita Shore to London.
Union	Great Britain	The ship sank at Ramsgate. She was on a voyage from London to Exon, Devon.

=== 20 October ===
List of shipwrecks: 20 October 1775
Ship	State	Description
Bee	Great Britain	The ship was driven ashore and wrecked in Lancaster Bay. Her crew were rescued. She was on a voyage from Liverpool, Lancashire to Africa.
Betsey	Great Britain	The ship was driven ashore and capsized at Whitehaven, Cumberland. She was severely damaged.
Fly Paquet	Great Britain	The ship foundered in the Formby Channel with the loss of six lives. She was on a voyage from Liverpool to Dublin, Ireland.
Peggy	Great Britain	The ship was driven ashore and wrecked in Lancaster Bay with the loss of ten of the 23 people on board. She was on a voyage from Virginia, British America to Liverpool.

=== Unknown date ===
List of shipwrecks: Unknown date 1775
Ship	State	Description
Active	Great Britain	The ship foundered in the North Sea off Orfordness, Suffolk with the loss of fourteen lives. She was on a voyage from Dundee, Perthshire to London.
Catharine	Great Britain	The ship was lost with all hands in mid-October.
Charming Mary	Great Britain	The ship was driven ashore 40 nautical miles (74 km) north of Liverpool, Lancashire.
Favourite	Ireland	The ship was driven ashore and wrecked at Hoylake, Cheshire. She was on a voyage from Livorno, Grand Duchy of Tuscany to Dublin.
Favourite	Great Britain	The ship was driven ashore and wrecked at Hoylake. She was on a voyage from Dublin, Ireland to London.
Friendship	Ireland	The ship was lost at Holyhead, Anglesey, Great Britain. She was on a voyage from Dublin to Bordeaux, France.
Grace	Great Britain	The ship foundered 8 leagues (24 nautical miles (44 km) south of Cape St. Antonio, Captaincy General of Cuba. She was on a voyage from Jamaica to London.
Hector	Great Britain	The ship was wrecked on the Burbo Bank, in Liverpool Bay. She was on a voyage from Baltimore, Maryland, British America to Liverpool.
Industry	Great Britain	The ship was lost in Cardigan Bay. She was on a voyage from Dublin to London.
Jane	Great Britain	The ship was driven ashore and wrecked on Eierland, Dutch Republic. She was on a voyage from "Cotte" to Hamburg.
Jenny	Great Britain	The ship was wrecked on the Welsh coast. She was on a voyage from Königsburg, Prussia to Bristol, Gloucestershire.
Juno	Great Britain	The ship capsized in the Atlantic Ocean off the coast of Portugal. Her crew were rescued. She was on a voyage from London to Africa.
Maria Wilhelmina	Great Britain	The ship foundered in the Atlantic Ocean off Faial Island, Azores. All on board were rescued. She was on a voyage from South Carolina to Gosport, Hampshire.
Prosperous	Great Britain	The ship foundered in the Irish Sea off Holyhead. She was on a voyage from Lancaster, Lancashire to Hamburg.
Sarah	Great Britain	The ship was lost at Anholt, Denmark. She was on a voyage from Saint Petersburg, Russia to Newcastle upon Tyne, Northumberland.
Success	(Kingdom of Great Britain) Jersey	The ship was driven ashore and wrecked at Great Yarmouth, Norfolk.
Traffick	Great Britain	The ship was wrecked on the West Hoyle sandbank, in Liverpool Bay. She was on a voyage from Saint Croix to Cork, Ireland and Liverpool.

== November ==
=== 1 November ===
List of shipwrecks: 1 November 1775
Ship	State	Description
Christiana	(Denmark) Norway	The ship departed from Le Havre, France for Norrköping. No further trace, presumed foundered with the loss of all hands.

=== 3 November ===
List of shipwrecks: 3 November 1775
Ship	State	Description
St Etienne	France	The ship was driven ashore and wrecked at Penzance, Cornwall, Great Britain. Her crew were rescued. She was on a voyage from the Charente to Rouen.

=== 4 November ===
List of shipwrecks: 4 November 1775
Ship	State	Description
Rose	Great Britain	The ship was lost near Londonderry, Ireland. She was on a voyage from Maryland, British America to Bristol, Gloucestershire.

=== 5 November ===
List of shipwrecks: 5 November 1775
Ship	State	Description
Elizabeth	Great Britain	The snow was wrecked on the coast of Prince Edward Island, British North America.
Helvetia	Denmark	The ship foundered in the North Sea off the Dutch coast with the loss of all but her captain. She was on a voyage from Copenhagen to Saint Croix.

=== 10 November ===
List of shipwrecks: 10 November 1775
Ship	State	Description
Betsey	Great Britain	The ship was driven ashore between Falsterbourn and "Draker", Sweden.

=== 11 November ===
List of shipwrecks: 11 November 1775
Ship	State	Description
Fame	Great Britain	The ship struck a rock near Belfast, County Antrim, Ireland and was wrecked. She was on a voyage from Jamaica to Bristol, Gloucestershire.
Unknown, Unknown, unknown	United States	American Revolution: Three Hulks were scuttled as Block ships near Charleston, South Carolina.

=== 12 November ===
List of shipwrecks: 12 November 1775
Ship	State	Description
Unknown	United States	American Revolution: The Hulk was scuttled as a Block ship near Charleston, South Carolina. Vessel was set on fire by the British, then towed out of the channel.

=== 13 November ===
List of shipwrecks: 13 November 1775
Ship	State	Description
Anapolis	Great Britain	The ship was driven ashore and wrecked in Mount's Bay with the loss of all hands.
Carron	Great Britain	The ship was driven ashore near Dunbar, Lothian. Her crew were rescued. She was on a voyage from London to Carron, Falkirk.
Elizabeth	Great Britain	The ship was driven ashore in The Wash 9 nautical miles (17 km) from King's Lynn, Norfolk. She was on a voyage from Memel, Prussia to King's Lynn.
Fountain	Great Britain	The ship was driven ashore in The Wash 13 nautical miles (24 km) from Ling's Lynn. She was on a voyage from Newcastle upon Tyne, Northumberland to King's Lynn.
Generous Betty	Great Britain	The ship was driven ashore and wrecked at Dunbar. Her crew were rescued. She was on a voyage from Memel, Prussia to Perth.
Hammond	Great Britain	The ship was driven ashore in The Wash 13 nautical miles (24 km) from Ling's Lynn. She was on a voyage from Newcastle upon Tyne to King's Lynn.
Nancy	Great Britain	The ship was driven ashore and wrecked at Dunbar. Her crew were rescued. She was on a voyage from Memel to Inverkeithing, Fife.
Nelly and Betty	Great Britain	The ship was driven ashore and wrecked near Dunbar. Her crew were rescued. She was on a voyage from Saint Petersburg, Russia to Leith, Lothian.
Unity	Great Britain	The transport ship sprang a leak in the Bay of Biscay whilst on a voyage from Hamburg to Gibraltar. Thirteen of the fourteen officers abandoned ship, but were drowned when their boat capsized. Unity was beached on the Île de Ré, France. She was later taken in to Bordeaux.

=== 16 November ===
List of shipwrecks: 16 November 1775
Ship	State	Description
Charming Betsey	Great Britain	The ship was driven ashore at Coutances, France.
Cranbrook	Great Britain	The ship was wrecked on the Goodwin Sands, Kent with the loss of all on board. She was on a voyage from London to Jamaica.

=== 17 November ===
List of shipwrecks: 17 November 1775
Ship	State	Description
Betty	Great Britain	The ship was driven ashore and wrecked at Marazion, Cornwall. She was on a voyage from London to Dublin, Ireland.
Diana	Great Britain	The ship was driven ashore north of Great Yarmouth, Norfolk.
Konigsgave	Denmark	The ship was lost at Callantsoog, Dutch Republic with the loss of five of her fourteen crew. She was on a voyage from St. Ubes, Portugal to Copenhagen.
Thomas and Francis	Great Britain	The ship was driven ashore near Cley-next-the-Sea, Norfolk.

=== Unknown date ===
List of shipwrecks: Unknown date 1775
Ship	State	Description
Adventure	Ireland	The ship was driven ashore at Lowestoft, Suffolk, Great Britain with the loss of all except her captain. She was on a voyage from Saint Petersburg, Russia to Galway.
Anna	Dutch Republic	The ship was driven ashore on the coast of Zeeland with the loss of all hands.
Baltic Merchant	Great Britain	The ship was wrecked in the Orkney Islands. She was on a voyage from Norway to Dublin, Ireland.
Baltimore Paquet	Great Britain	The ship was driven ashore on Vlieland, Dutch Republic.
Britton	Great Britain	The transport ship was driven ashore near Dunkirk, France.
Caspar	Sweden	The ship was wrecked on Vlieland with the loss of all hands. She was on a voyage from Stockholm to Lisbon, Portugal.
Charming Sally	Great Britain	The ship was lost near Newport, Monmouthshire. She was on a voyage from Málaga, Spain to Amsterdam Dutch Republic.
Christiana	Dutch Republic	The galley was driven ashore and wrecked at Camperduin.
De Jonge	Dutch Republic	The ship was driven ashore on the coast of Zeeland.
Dove	Great Britain	The sloop sank in the Thames Estuary.
Edward	Great Britain	The ship was driven ashore near "Ardinery". She was on a voyage from St. Ubes, Portugal to Dublin.
Elizabeth	Great Britain	The ship was driven ashore on the coast of Zeeland with the loss of all but one of her crew. She was on a voyage from Bristol, Gloucestershire to Rotterdam, Dutch Republic.
Elizabeth	Great Britain	The ship was wrecked on the Goodwin Sands, Kent. Her crew were rescued. She was on a voyage from Saint Petersburg to Bristol.
Flying Mercury	Great Britain	The ship sank in the Elbe. She was on a voyage from London to Hamburg.
Friendship	Great Britain	The ship was wrecked near Wells-next-the-Sea, Norfolk with the loss of all hands. She was on a voyage from Memel, Prussia to Hull, Yorkshire.
Grizzie	Great Britain	The ship ran aground off Kinsale, County Cork, Ireland. She was on a voyage from Glasgow, Renfrewshire to Limerick, Ireland.
Hub Volkers	Hamburg	The ship was driven ashore on Vlieland. She was on a voyage from Málaga to Hamburg.
Industry	Great Britain	The ship was driven ashore in the River Thames at Gravesend, Kent. She was on a voyage from Drogheda, County Louth, Ireland to London.
Industry	Ireland	The ship was wrecked near Ballycastle, County Antrim. She was on a voyage from Málaga, Spain to Dublin.
Jacob	Danzig	The ship was lost on Vlieland with the loss of all hands. She was on a voyage from "Rochford" to Danzig.
John & Betsey	Great Britain	The ship sank in the Weser. Her crew were rescued. She was on a voyage from Lisbon to Hamburg.
London Paquet	Great Britain	The ship was driven ashore at Calais, France. She was on a voyage from London to Calais.
Malaga Paquet	Great Britain	The ship sank in the River Thames at the Tower of London. She was later refloated.
Maria	Great Britain	The ship was driven ashore on the Maze, Dutch Republic. She was on a voyage from Faro, Portugal to Hamburg.
Mucks	Great Britain	The ship was lost on the Dutch coast. She was on a voyage from Bristol, Gloucestershire to Norway.
Nancy	Great Britain	The ship was lost near Hamburg with some loss of life. She was on a voyage from Liverpool to Hamburg.
Rialto	Great Britain	The ship was lost at Great Yarmouth. She was on a voyage from Great Yarmouth to Venice.
Rialto	Great Britain	The ship was driven ashore near Gallipoli, Ottoman Empire on "31 November". She was on a voyage from London to Constantinople and Smyrna, Ottoman Empire.
St Jean Baptista	France	The ship was driven ashore and wrecked near Dunkirk. She was on a voyage from Bordeaux to Ostend.
St Louis	France	The ship was driven ashore near Dunkirk. She was on a voyage from Nantes to Dunkirk.
Susanna	Ireland	The ship was driven ashore near Dunkirk. She was on a voyage from Saint Petersburg to Cork.
Three Brothers	Great Britain	The ship was driven ashore on Texel, Dutch Republic. She was on a voyage from Königsburg, Prussia to London.
Tithys	France	The ship was wrecked on the Île de Batz with the loss of six of her crew. She was on a voyage from Le Havre to Martinique.
Triton	Great Britain	The ship was lost on the Eaith Holmes. She was on a voyage from Saint Petersburg to Hull, Yorkshire.
Two Sisters	Great Britain	The ship sank at Brixham, Devon. She was on a voyage from Newcastle upon Tyne to Brixham.
Victaine	France	The ship was driven ashore near Dunkirk. She was on a voyage from Saint-Domingue to Dunkirk.

== December ==
=== 3 December ===
List of shipwrecks: 3 December 1772
Ship	State	Description
Pervy (Первый, 'The First')	Imperial Russian Navy	The Pervy-class frigate, with heavy storm damage, was wrecked in a beaching attempt near ru:Sucukkale (now Novorossiysk) with the loss of 58 of her 157 crew. She was on a voyage from the Bosphorus to Kertch.

=== 5 December ===
List of shipwrecks: 5 December 1772
Ship	State	Description
Tarantul (Тарантул, 'Tarantula')	Imperial Russian Navy	The transport ship was driven ashore at Taman. She was on a voyage from Yenikale to the ru:Petrovskaya Fortress on the Sea of Azov. The ship was dismantled in situ.

=== 23 December ===
List of shipwrecks: 23 December 1775
Ship	State	Description
Castle Rockingham, Marquis of Rockingham or Rockingham	Great Britain	The ship was wrecked in Reannie's Bay, County Cork, Ireland with the loss of over 100 lives. There were about 35 survivors.

=== Unknown date ===
List of shipwrecks: Unknown date 1775
Ship	State	Description
Abby	Great Britain	The ship was lost at Crookhaven, County Cork, Ireland. She was on a voyage from Virginia, British America to Liverpool, Lancashire.
Ceres	Great Britain	The ship was lost at Cádiz, Spain. She was on a voyage from London to Cádiz.
Dispatch	Great Britain	The ship was wrecked on the Dutch coast. She was on a voyage from Málaga, Spain to Hamburg.
Magdalen	Great Britain	The ship was lost at Málaga. She was on a voyage from Newfoundland, British America to Málaga.
Mary & Jane	Great Britain	The ship was lost on the coast of Spain. She was on a voyage from Málaga to Hull, Yorkshire.
New Adventure	Great Britain	The ship was driven ashore and wrecked near "Warburg". She was on a voyage from Königsburg, Prussia to London.
Thomas & Mary	Great Britain	The ship was lost at Málaga. She was on a voyage from Newfoundland to Málaga.
William	Great Britain	The ship sank on the Wicklow Banks, in the Irish Sea. Her crew were rescued. She was on a voyage from Liverpool to Bristol, Gloucestershire.

== Unknown date ==
List of shipwrecks: Unknown date 1775
Ship	State	Description
Active	Great Britain	The ship was driven ashore on the coast of North Carolina, British America with the loss of all but two of her crew.
Austin	Great Britain	The ship was driven ashore and wrecked on the coast of North Carolina. She was on a voyage from Tobago to Liverpool, Lancashire.
Baltimore	(United States) British America	The ship was lost on the coast of British America. She was on a voyage from Maryland to Liverpool.
Betsey	Great Britain	The ship was lost on Man's Island. She was on a voyage from New England, British America to the West Indies and Georgia, British America.
Betsey	Great Britain	The ship foundered in the Atlantic Ocean 70 leagues (210 nautical miles (390 km) east of Newfoundland, British America. Her crew were rescued. She was on a voyage from London to Quebec, British America.
British Queen	Great Britain	The ship was lost in the Davis Strait.
Caton	Great Britain	African slave trade: The ship was destroyed by fire at Jamaica with the loss of three slaves.
Clementina	Great Britain	The ship was driven ashore on the coast of North Carolina. She was on a voyage from London to North Carolina.
Creole	Great Britain	The ship foundered in the Atlantic Ocean with the loss of all hands. She was on a voyage from Virginia, British America to London.
Cuddalore	India	The schooner was wrecked.
Diana	Great Britain	The ship foundered in the Atlantic Ocean. Her crew were rescued by Freemason (Great Britain). Diana was on a voyage from Cape Fear, North Carolina to Glasgow, Renfrewshire.
Elizabeth	Great Britain	The ship was lost at Basse-Terre, Guadeloupe with the loss of a crew member.
Elizabeth	Great Britain	The ship was lost in the Gut of Canso. She was on a voyage from London to St. John's, Newfoundland.
Endeavour	Ireland	The ship caught fire in the Delaware River and was scuttled. She was on a voyage from Philadelphia, Pennsylvania, British America to Londonderry.
Fanny	Great Britain	The ship was holed by the anchor of Ashburnham (Great Britain) and sank at Calcutta, India. She was on a voyage from Calcutta to China.
Hector	Great Britain	The ship was wrecked on the Frying Pan Shoals, in the Atlantic Ocean off the coast of North Carolina.
Hope	Great Britain	The ship was lost at Newfoundland.
Jenny	Great Britain	The ship was lost at Newfoundland.
Joseph	Great Britain	The ship was lost at Fogo, Newfoundland.
Juno	Great Britain	The ship was lost at Newfoundland.
King of Prussia	Great Britain	The ship was lost in the Davis Strait.
Laurel	Great Britain	The transport ship was lost in the Bay of Fundy.
L'Hiver	Great Britain	The ship was driven ashore at Saint-Domingue.
Live Oak	Great Britain	The ship foundered in the Atlantic Ocean off the coast of Virginia with the loss of all but two of her crew. She was on a voyage from the Leeward Islands to Virginia.
Louisa	Great Britain	The ship was lost in the East Indies.
Maria-Adelaid	Great Britain	The ship was lost in the Bengal River.
Mary	Great Britain	The ship was lost at Newfoundland.
Mary-ann	Great Britain	The schooner was driven ashore in the Windward Passage. She was on a voyage from Jamaica to London.
Mary-ann	Great Britain	The ship was lost at Requin, Grenada. She was on a voyage from Grenada to London.
Mentor	Great Britain	The ship was lost at Newfoundland.
Mercury	(Kingdom of Great Britain) Guernsey	The ship was lost on the coat of "Tortosa". She was on a voyage from "Saloe" to Guernsey.
Myrtle	Great Britain	The ship was lost at "Pilafowdry".
Nancy	Great Britain	The ship foundered in the Atlantic Ocean about 40 leagues off the American coast. She was on a voyage from Spain to Philadelphia.
Nancy	Great Britain	The ship was lost near Charles Town, South Carolina.
Nossa Senhora da Attalaga	Great Britain	The ship was lost north of Bahia, Brazil with some loss of life. She was on a voyage from Rio de Janeiro, Brazil to Porto.
Nossa Senhora do Monte do Carmo	Portugal	The ship was wrecked on the coast of Madagascar. She was on a voyage from Lisbon to the East Indies.
Novelle Marguirett	France	The ship was lost at Barrington. She was on a voyage from Saint-Domingue to Bordeaux.
Oswald	Great Britain	The whaler was lost off the coast of Greenland.
Peggy	Great Britain	The whaler was lost off the coast of Greenland.
Polly	Great Britain	The ship was lost on the coast of North Carolina.
Port Morant	Great Britain	The ship foundered in the Windward Passage. She was on a voyage from Jamaica to London.
Prosperity	Great Britain	The ship ran aground at Egg Harbour, New Jersey, British America.
Rebecca & Francis	Great Britain	The transport ship was lost on the coast of British America.
Resolution	Great Britain	The ship was lost in the Davis Strait.
Royal Exchange	Great Britain	The ship was lost on the coat of North Carolina. Her crew were rescued. She was on a voyage from North Carolina to London.
Sally	Great Britain	The ship was lost on the coast of Africa.
Sally	Great Britain	The ship foundered in the Atlantic Ocean off the coast of Newfoundland. She was on a voyage from London to Quebec.
Samuel and John	Great Britain	The ship was lost at "Ordeauin", Newfoundland.
Shark	Great Britain	The ship was lost on the coast of Africa.
St George	Portugal	The ship was lost in India.
St Francisco de Paula	Portugal	The ship was destroyed by fire in the East Indies.
St Guillaume	France	African slave trade: The ship was lost at Saint-Domingue. She was on a voyage from Africa to Saint-Domingue.
Triton	Great Britain	The ship was lost at Fogo, Newfoundland.
Totness	Great Britain	American Revolutionary War: The ship was burnt at a port in Maryland by the inhabitants.
