= Nathaniel Coffin =

Nathaniel Coffin may refer to:

- Nathaniel Coffin (politician)
- Nathaniel Coffin (physician)
