= HMS Canceaux =

Sloop of the Royal Navy

History

Great Britain
- Name: HMS Canceaux
- Operator: Royal Navy
- Acquired: February 1764
- Commissioned: 1764 under Lt. Henry Mowatt
- Recommissioned: 1776 under Lt John Shank
- Out of service: 1782
- Refit: February–May 1771
- Fate: Sold out of service, Quebec, 1783

General characteristics
- Tons burthen: 183 77/94 (bm)
- Length: 80 ft 6 in (24.5 m) (overall); 64 ft 10 in (19.8 m) (keel)
- Beam: 23 ft 1 in (7.0 m)
- Depth of hold: 10 ft 9 in (3.3 m)
- Propulsion: Sail
- Complement: 55
- Armament: 6 ships' guns (unknown poundage); 8 × 1/2-pdr swivels

HMS Canceaux was a sloop active in both the hydrographic exploration of the Atlantic Canada and New England coastline, revenue protection, and in the American Revolutionary War. She played an integral role in the battle for control of Maine, in particular at the Burning of Falmouth.

Canceaux, a 20 gun armed ship was purchased at Quebec in February 1774 and was possibly a merchant ship before being commissioned by the Royal Navy as a Survey vessel.

Rear Admiral John Montagu reports Canceaux arriving in Boston from England on 24 August 1771, after a delay in departure due to losing six men.

Canceaux was at the Saint Lawrence River estuary in 1771. In 1772 Captain Holland, Surveyor General of the Coast ordered the commander of HMS Canceaux, Lieutenant Henry Mowat, to purchase boats and stores for their journey.

== Incident at Fort William and Mary ==
In December 1774 HMS Canceaux, under the command of Lt. Henry Mowat, attempted to restore order to Fort William and Mary following the seizure of supplies by colonial forces led by Paul Revere. The fort, located on New Castle Island near Portsmouth, New Hampshire, was seen as essential to reasserting control over the insurrection mounting amongst the populace. The concern caused by the colonial seizure of sixteen cannon and about one hundred barrels of gunpowder prompted the Canceaux to quickly depart Boston for Portsmouth. She arrived four days after the colonial forces had taken said resources from the fort. She was then grounded by the local maritime pilot and thus remained within an estuary of the Piscataqua River, stranded for many days.

== Involvement in Thompson's War ==
In early spring of 1775 Canceaux was actively patrolling the coastline of New England in an attempt to prevent smuggling and enforce British law. She anchored in Casco Bay in March to prevent colonists from enforcing the First Continental Congress boycott of all goods from Britain. The militia of Brunswick, Maine, controlled by Samuel Thompson, endeavored to drive the ship and her crew from the region in order to regain their authority within the city. After a militia boarding party in small boats had been deterred by grapeshot from Canceaux cannon, the local militia changed tack. Rather than targeting the entire ship and her crew they narrowed their sights upon the ship’s commander Lieutenant Henry Mowat. While the Lieutenant endeavored to arrange church services for his crew he was kidnapped and held by Thompson’s militia. This obvious affront to the authority of the British Navy and this crew in particular engendered ire amongst the crew and loyalist population alike. The highest ranking officer remaining aboard Canceaux, the first lieutenant, threatened the local populace to release Mowat or else they would begin to shell the city. The crew initially discharged the cannon loaded only with gunpowder, but no shot, in a veiled threat to the surrounding people. This threat was met by Thompson with the claim that for each shell fired at Falmouth, Mowat would lose a finger. By now the cannon fire had attracted local minutemen to Falmouth where they proceeded to loot the homes and valuables of loyalists residing in the city. The confrontation was eventually resolved as the local populace convinced Thompson to release the British commander. Mowat returned to Canceaux but was unable to take any locals into custody for his abduction, a reality that infuriated the commander. She eventually departed from Casco Bay to return to Boston to resume her typical activities of patrolling to preventing smuggling and enforcing British maritime law.

== Summer 1775 ==
Following her failures at Fort William and Mary, her involvement in Thompson’s War and the continued insurrection permeating thought the maritimes and New England’s coast, HMS Canceaux resumed the activities typical of a Royal Navy ship of the time. Her activities were primarily focused upon patrolling the coastline and preventing the illegal trade activities supported by colonial forces. Throughout the summer she fulfilled said function in order to enforce the laws and weaken the American efforts at insurrection. She captured many ships thought the summer including those smuggling between colonial ports and even those smuggling internationally. She habitually escorted captured ships and impressed crewmen regularly.

== Role in the Burning of Falmouth ==
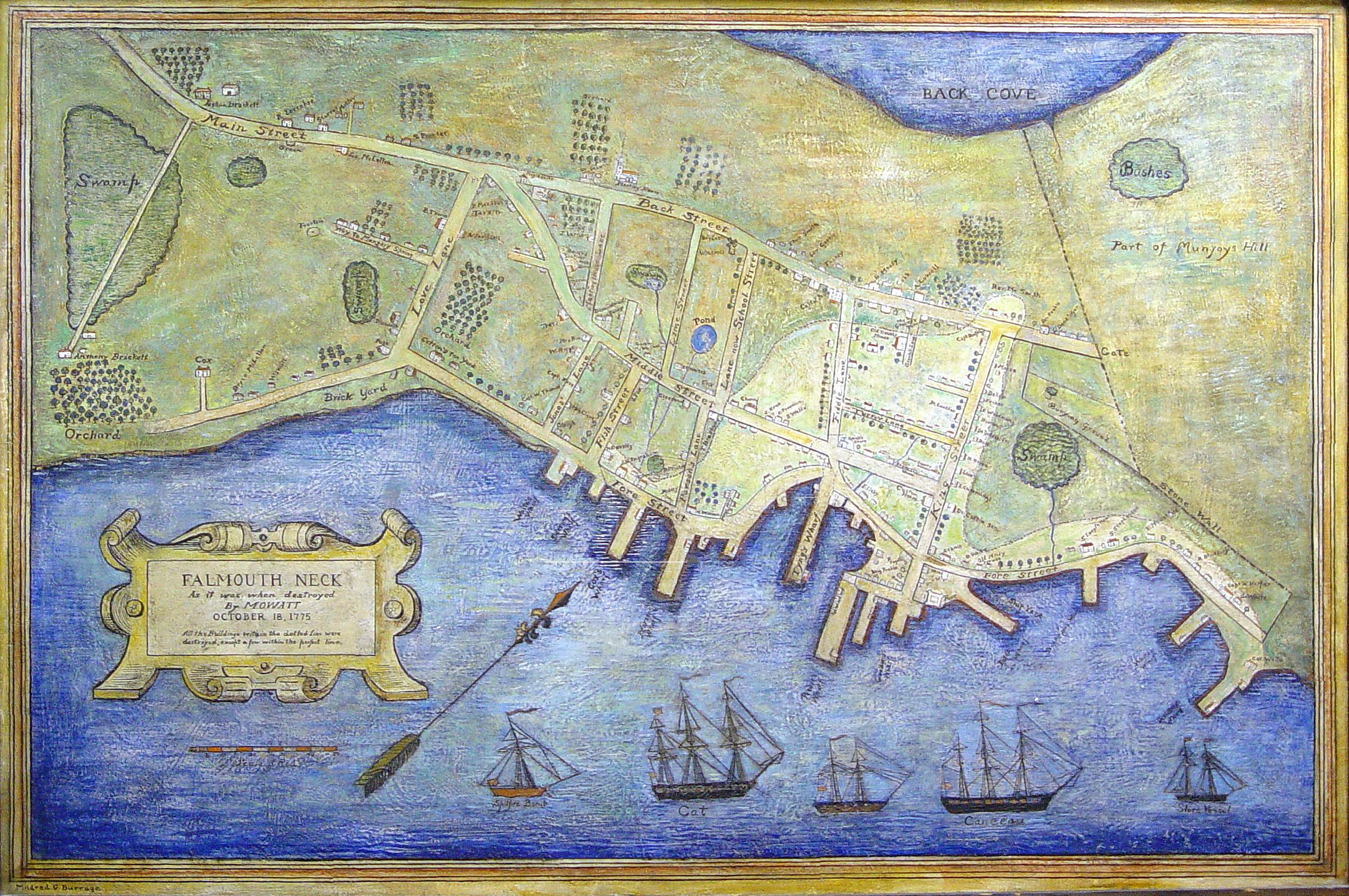
The ships drawn on this map showing the burned area are intended to represent, from left to right, Spitfire, Cat, Halifax, Canceaux and Symmetry.

In order to suppress the insurrections and reinforce the clout of the British Vice Admiral Samuel Graves was ordered "to exert yourself to the utmost towards crushing the daring rebellion that (has) now extended itself almost over the whole continent of America". Admiral Graves placed Lieutenant Mowat in charge of the plans for the retribution razing of seaports Marblehead, Salem, Gloucester, Ipswich, Newburyport, Portsmouth, Saco, Falmouth, and particularly Machias. He was placed at the command of a flotilla containing five ships including Canceaux. The exact armaments are still contested but it is believed that Canceaux was accompanied by the Cat, HMS Halifax, HMS Symmetry and HMS Spitfire. These ships were a 20-gun ship, a 12-gun schooner, a supply ship and a bomb sloop respectively. The supply ship served as a magazine for the bomb sloop during this engagement. As a safety measure to prevent loss of a ship through accidental ignition of unfired incendiary carcasses, carcasses were transferred by lighter from the non-firing supply ship to the bomb sloop as needed. The exact armaments onboard Canceaux are unknown but it is believed that she carried six ships guns of an unknown poundage.

The fleet proceeded north as instructed by Graves, choosing to focus upon Falmouth. In an overt attempt to avenge the insults made by the local populace during Thompson's War, Mowat resolved to raze the town. On 18 October 1775, he ordered the nine-hour bombardment of Falmouth using regular and heated shot. He also ordered a landing party to be sent ashore to complete the town's destruction; the party captured four American vessels and destroyed eleven more. Among the colonies, news of the attack led to rejection of British authority and the establishment of independent governments. It also led the Second Continental Congress to contest British naval dominance by forming the Continental Navy. Both Mowat and Graves suffered professionally as a consequence of the event.

== Final years ==
Following her experiences from summer 1775, HMS Canceaux was in need of repairs and thus was once again sent to the Royal Dockyards on the Thames. After having reached Gallion’s Reach in January of 1776 the extensive damaged caused by her time in Falmouth was repaired, restoring Canceaux to her former glory. She would return to America in the following April to live out the remainder of her time patrolling and surveying the coast of New England and the Maritimes.
