= Round shot =

Type of artillery projectile

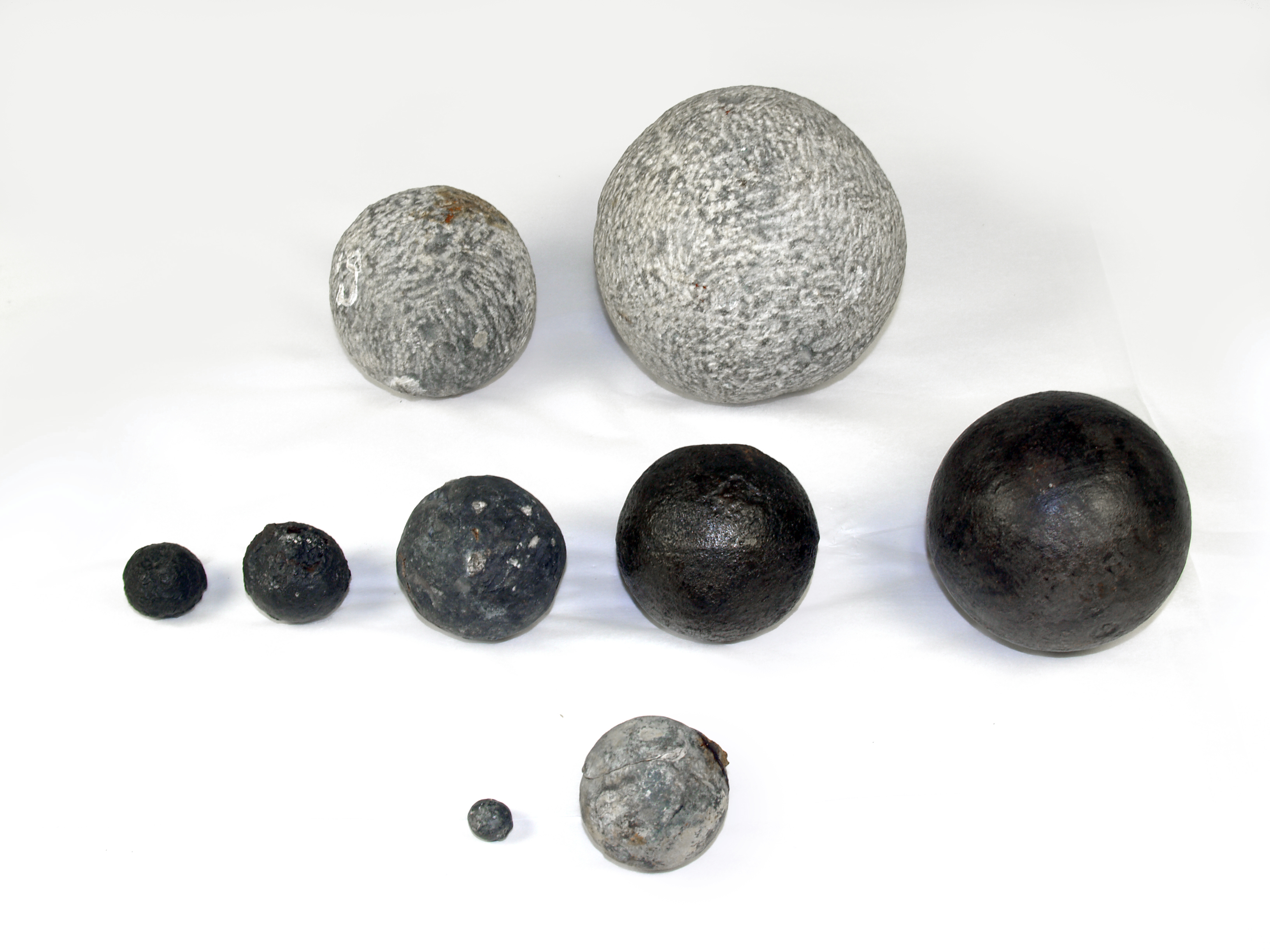
Various types of round shot made from stone, iron and lead found on board the 16th-century carrack Mary Rose

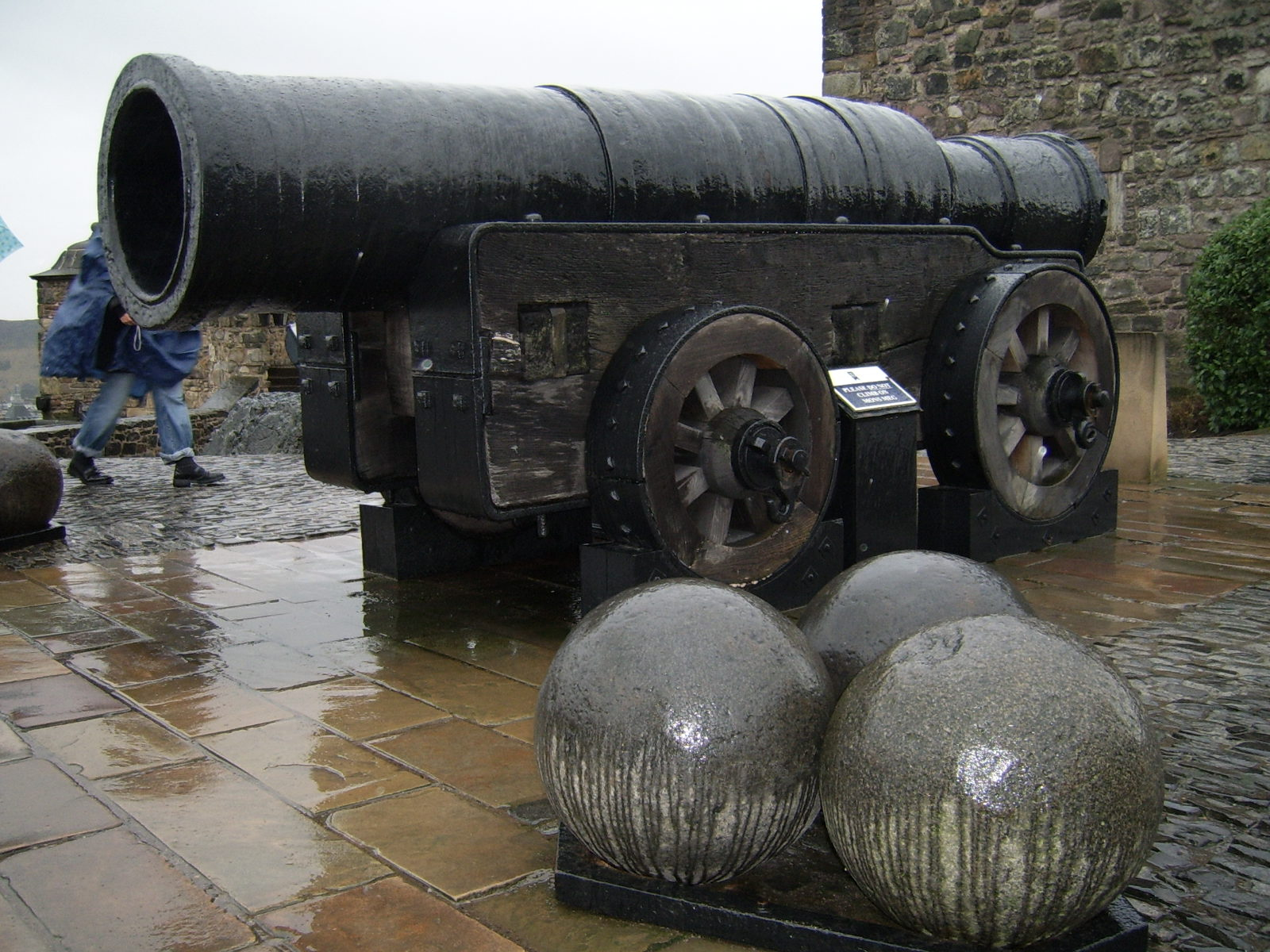
Mons Meg with its 20-inch caliber (51 cm), 386 lb (175 kg) cannonballs

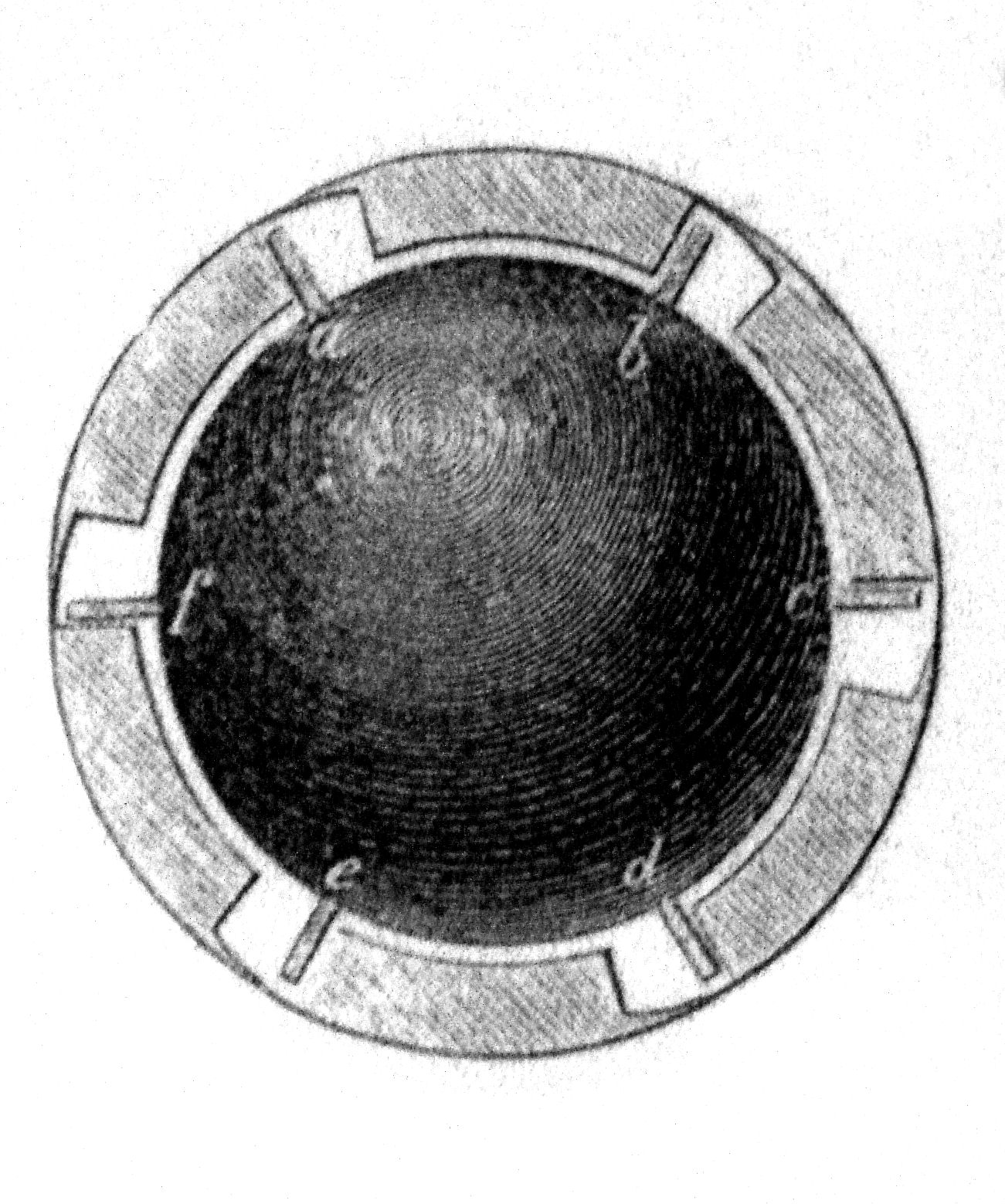
Cannonball equipped with winglets for rifled cannons, c. 1860

A round shot (also called solid shot or simply ball) is a solid spherical projectile without explosive charge, launched from a gun. Its diameter is slightly less than the bore of the barrel from which it is shot. A round shot fired from a large-caliber gun is also called a cannonball.

The cast iron cannonball was introduced by French artillery engineers after 1450; it had the capacity to reduce traditional English castle wall fortifications to rubble. French armories would cast a tubular cannon body in a single piece, and cannonballs took the shape of a sphere initially made from stone material. Advances in gunpowder manufacturing soon led the replacement of stone cannonballs with cast iron ones.

Round shot was made in early times from dressed stone, referred to as gunstone (Middle English: gunneston), but by the 17th century, from iron. It was used as the most accurate projectile that could be fired by a smoothbore cannon, used to batter the wooden hulls of opposing ships, fortifications, or fixed emplacements, and as a long-range anti-personnel weapon. However, masonry stone forts designed during the early modern period (known as star forts) were almost impervious to the effects of round shot.

In land battles, round shot would often plough through many ranks of troops, causing multiple casualties. Unlike the fake gunpowder explosions representing round shot in movies, round shot was more like a bouncing bowling ball that would not stop after the initial impact, but continue and tear through anything in its path. It could bounce when it hit the ground, striking men at each bounce. The casualties from round shot were extremely gory; when fired directly into an advancing column, a cannonball was capable of passing straight through up to forty men.

Even when most of its kinetic energy is expended, a round shot still has enough momentum to knock men over and cause gruesome injury. Because such instances often did not leave visible marks, this initially gave rise to the theory that even in the case of a near-miss, the so-called "wind of a ball" could cause internal injury or concussion, often with fatal results. The actual explanation for these cases, however, turned out to be the toughness and elasticity of the human skin.

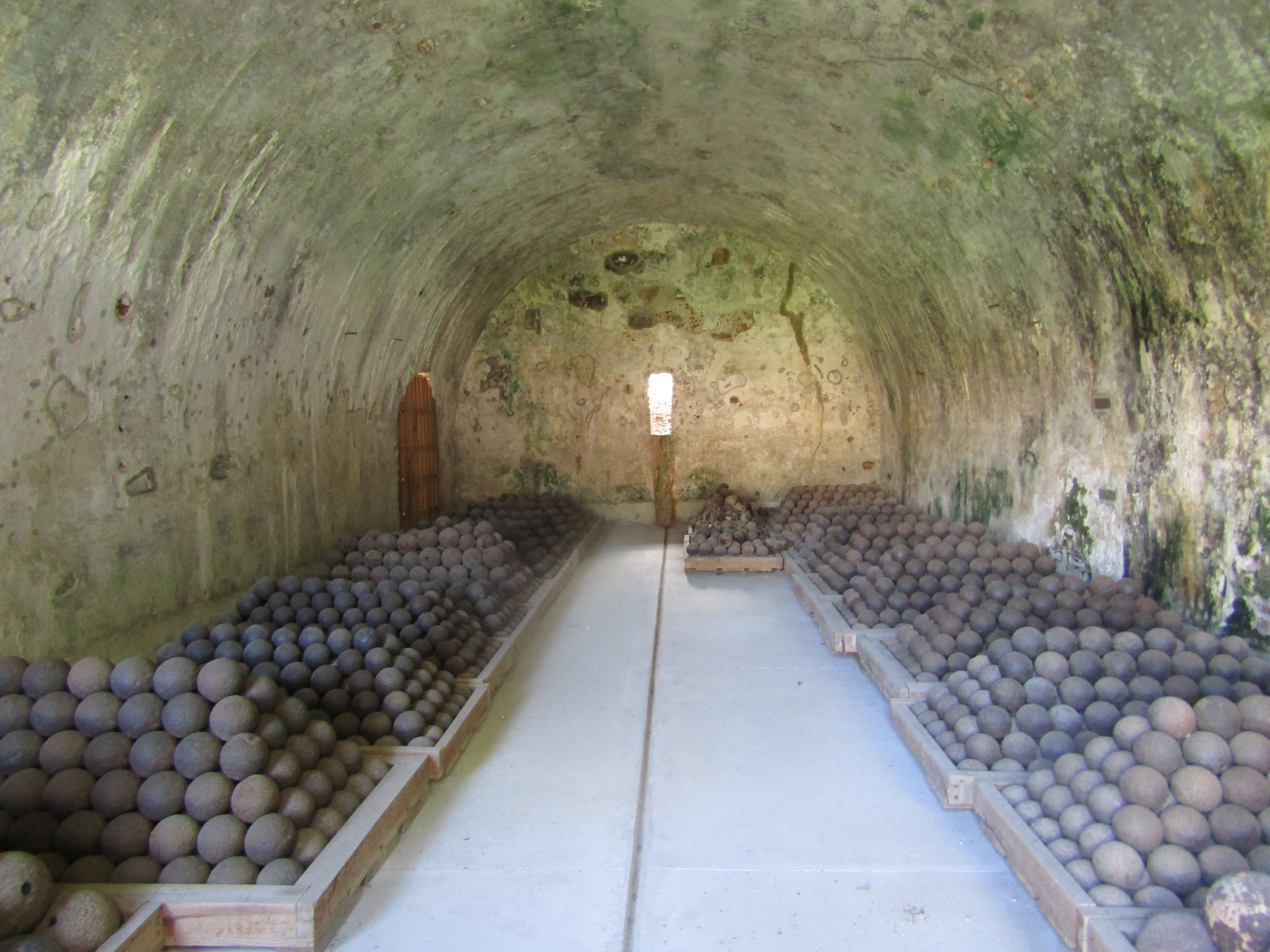
Vault full of cannonballs in the Omoa fortress, Honduras.

When attacking wooden ships or land structures that would be damaged by fire, the cannonball could be heated to red hot. This was called a "heated shot". (Regarding the shot called "the single deadliest cannon shot in American history", see Negro Fort.)

Round shot has the disadvantage of not being tightly fitted into the bore (to do so would cause jamming). This causes the shot to "rattle" down the gun barrel and leave the barrel at an angle, unless wadding or a discarding sabot is used. This difference in shot and bore diameter is called "windage".

Round shot has been totally replaced by modern shells. Round shot is used in historical recreations and historical replica weapons.

In the 1860s, some round shots were equipped with winglets to benefit from the rifling of cannons. Such round shot would benefit from gyroscopic stability, thereby improving their trajectory, although already obsolete due to the existence of the ogival shell since the 1850s.

== See also ==
- Carcass (projectile)
- Chain shot
- Heated shot
- List of cannon projectiles
