= Nathaniel Coffin (physician) =

American physician (1744–1826)

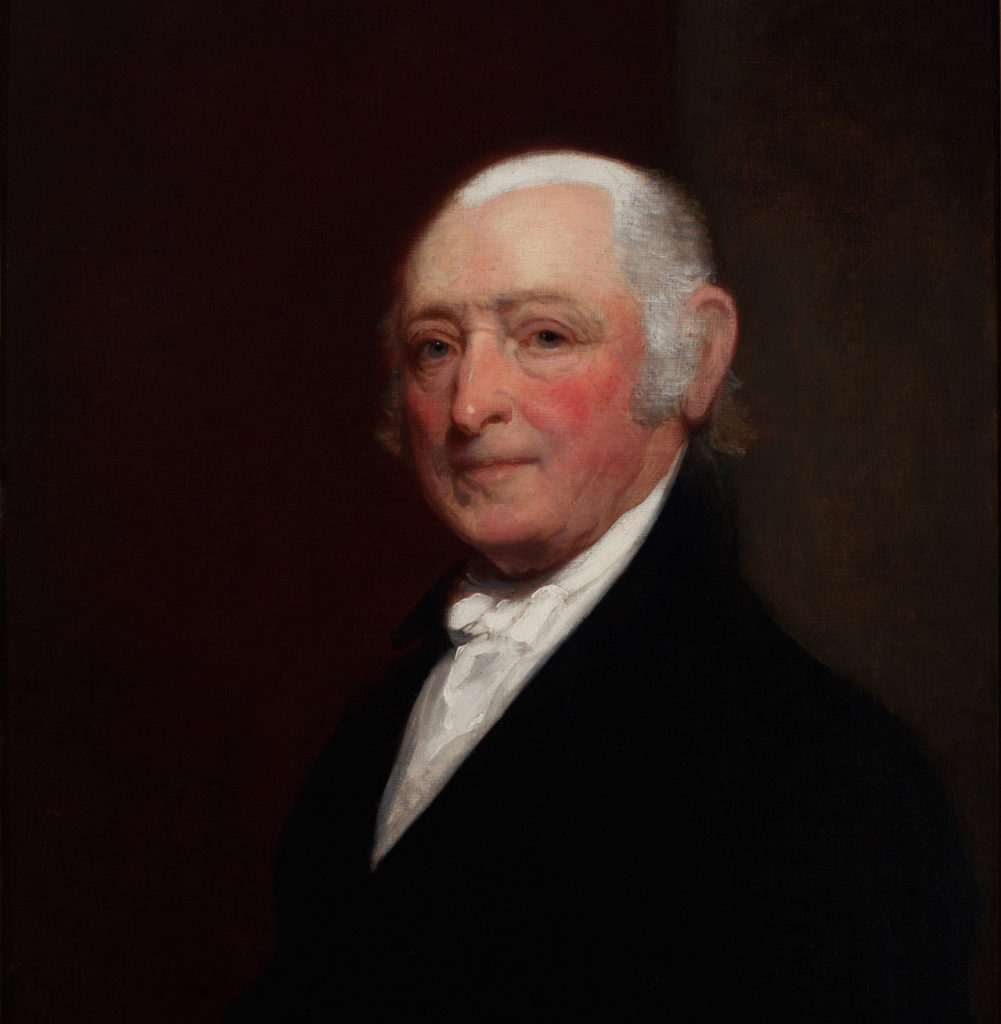
- An 1820 portrait of Coffin, by Gilbert Stuart
- Born: April 20, 1744; Newburyport, Province of Massachusetts Bay, Colonial America
- Died: October 21, 1826 (aged 82); Portland, Maine, U.S.

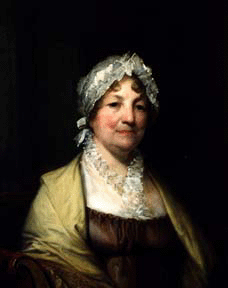
Eleanor Foster, wife of Coffin, in an 1820 portrait by Gilbert Stuart

Nathaniel Coffin (April 20, 1744 – October 21, 1826) was an American medical doctor. He became president of the Maine Medical Society, and was recognized as the most eminent physician in what became the State of Maine.

== Life and career ==
Coffin was born in 1744, in Newburyport, Province of Massachusetts Bay, to Dr. Nathaniel Coffin and Patience Hale. His father was a descendant of English immigrant Tristram Coffin, who arrived on American shores in 1642. Coffin Jr. studied medicine under his father, and in 1763 left to work for two years in England, at Guy's Hospital and St Thomas' Hospital in London.

Coffin's father died in 1766, at which point Nathaniel Jr. inherited his practice, in what at the time was known as Falmouth, Province of Massachusetts Bay (today's Portland, Maine).

In 1769, he married Eleanor Foster, of Charlestown, Province of Massachusetts Bay, with whom he had seven children. The Coffinses daughter, Eleanor, had commissioned portraits of her parents in 1820, undertaken in oil-on-panel by Gilbert Stuart. Another daughter, Martha, married Richard Crowninshield Derby.

In 1775, Coffin and two others boarded HMS Canceaux, the sloop of Captain Henry Mowat, in an unsuccessful attempt to dissuade his planned burning of Falmouth.

In 1803, Coffin had built the Washington Hall Hotel in today's Monument Square, Portland. It stood for the next 162 years, having closed in 1900.

Coffin and four other Maine physicians petitioned the council of the Massachusetts Medical Society to permit a District of Maine Medical Society, with the intent of meetings behind held in Portland. It was granted, and Coffin became the Society's president.

He was a member of Portland's First Parish Church.

== Death ==
Coffin died in 1826, aged 82. His wife preceded him in death. They were both interred in Portland's Eastern Cemetery.

=== Legacy ===
In his obituary in the Boston Daily Advertiser (but provided by the Portland Advertiser) on October 26, 1826, Coffin was described as "the most ancient and eminent physician in [that] state".
