= Thompson's War =

1775 incident during the American Revolutionary War

- Part of the Boston campaign
Date	May 1775
Location	Falmouth, Massachusetts Bay
Result	Capture of HMS Canceaux aborted but the vessel was forced to leave Casco Bay, Retaliatory burning of Falmouth later that year

Belligerents
Patriot militia	Loyalists; Great Britain

Commanders and leaders
Samuel Thompson	Henry Mowat

Thompson's War was an early American Revolutionary War confrontation between Samuel Thompson's patriot militia and loyalists supported by HMS Canceaux. The confrontation ended without fatalities, but provoked the retaliatory Burning of Falmouth five months later. Falmouth is now known as Portland, Maine, at the time part of Massachusetts.

== Background ==
Brunswick, Maine, tavern owner Samuel Thompson had been elected to the Brunswick Board of selectmen in 1768, 1770, and 1771. He was elected commander of the Brunswick militia in 1774 and headed the local enforcement committee for the Continental Association created by the First Continental Congress to boycott all goods from Great Britain.

The Continental Association attempted to enforce the boycott on 2 March 1775 against a shipload of sail, rope, and rigging for loyalist shipbuilder Captain Samuel Coulson of Portland by demanding the delivery ship leave port. Coulson requested delay while the English sloop completed needed repairs after its trans-Atlantic voyage. HMS Canceaux was dispatched from Boston while the repairs were in progress; and, following its arrival on March 29, Coulson proceeded to offload his British goods under the protection of the British warship.

The battles of Lexington and Concord took place 90 miles (150 km) to the south while Canceaux lay at anchor in Casco Bay. When news of the battle reached Brunswick on April 21, the Brunswick militia laid plans to capture Canceaux.

== Militia mobilized ==
Spruce trees carried in the boats of Samuel Thompson's militia inspired this Naval Ensign of Massachusetts.

Fifty Brunswick militiamen wearing a sprig of spruce in their hats as a uniform arrived in Portland secretly aboard small boats carrying a spruce tree with the lower branches cleared away as a battle ensign. Canceaux was prepared to prevent the small boats from boarding; but Thompson's militia captured the warship's captain, Lieutenant Henry Mowat, on 9 May 1775 while he was ashore arranging church services for his crew.

The first lieutenant aboard Canceaux discharged two cannon salutes (gunpowder charges without shot) toward Portland and threatened to shell Portland unless the captain was released. Six hundred militiamen from surrounding communities gathered as Portland residents negotiated to prevent their community from becoming a battleground. Mowat was allowed to return to his ship. He demanded to arrest Thompson but was refused, and the assembled militia forced Canceaux to leave port on May 15.

== Aftermath ==
Disappointed militiamen vented their frustration by looting the homes of Coulson and loyalist Sheriff Tyng before returning to their inland communities. News of Thompson's attempt encouraged Machias, Maine, militiamen to capture the British armed schooner Margaretta a month later in the Battle of Machias.

Mowat brought Canceaux back to Portland in October to set fires which left Portland's population homeless as winter approached. More than 400 buildings and houses were recorded as damaged or destroyed by fire.

The Massachusetts House of Representatives promoted Samuel Thompson to Brigadier of the York County militia on 8 February 1776 in recognition of his initiative following the battles of Lexington and Concord; and the spruce trees his men carried provided inspiration for adoption of the Pine Tree Flag as the Massachusetts naval ensign in April 1776.

Thompson moved to Topsham, Maine, in 1783, and was regularly elected to the Massachusetts General Court until his death in 1798 at the age of 63. Thompson donated part of his significant real estate holdings to Bowdoin College when the school was chartered in 1794.
