= Battle of Falmouth (1779) =

Battle during the American Revolutionary War

Coordinates: 41.5415°N 70.6214°W

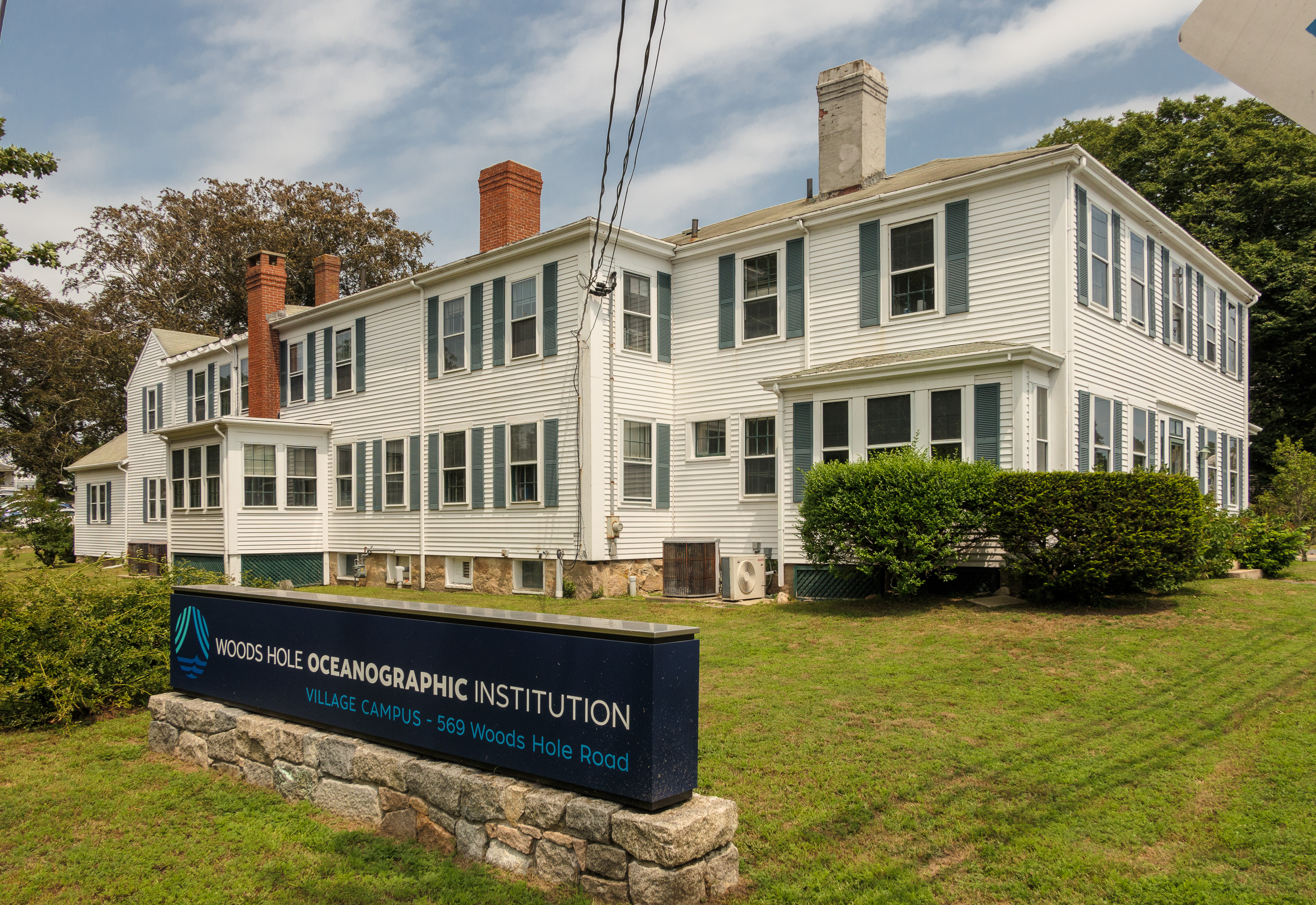
- Ephraim Swift Farm, raided by the British during the battle.
Date	April 1st and 2nd, 1779
Location	Woods Hole and Falmouth, Massachusetts
Result	American Victory

Belligerents
Royal Navy and Royal Marines	Massachusetts Militia

Commanders and leaders
Capt. Henry Mowat	Col. Joseph Dimmick

Units involved
10 ships several hundred sailors and marines	50 to 200 Militia several cannons and small arms

Casualties and losses
Unknown	None

The Battle of Falmouth was a military engagement carried out by the Royal Navy and Royal Marines during the American Revolutionary War. Attempting to gather supplies, several hundred British sailors and marines landed at Woods Hole on April 1, 1779, and raided the farm and home of Ephraim Swift, which still stands on the Woods Hole Oceanographic Institute campus. slaughtering their livestock. During the retreat back to their boats, the British forces were attacked by an American militia force, and forced to retreat back to their ships empty-handed. British Captain Henry Mowat landed at Naushon Island, and spent the night on the island with a Loyalist family. Mowat boasted he was going to burn Falmouth to the ground. The head of the family, John Slocum, concerned about loss of life, sent his young son across the Vineyard Sound to warn Col. Joseph Dimmick and the American forces. Early the next morning, the British forces attempted to land on what is now Surf Drive Beach in Falmouth, and were surprised to see cannon-laden trenches constructed overnight. The Americans, made up of several militia companies from Falmouth and nearby Sandwich, had several artillery pieces but mostly had muskets and other small arms. The British vessels returned fire, and a five hour battle began. The British attempted to land several times, but were repulsed by cannon shot and musket fire. After five hours of this, Mowat decided to cut his losses and return to Newport. None of the British crews had set foot on shore, and there were no casualties on the American side.
