= Burning of Falmouth =

1775 bombardment in Massachusetts, US

Coordinates: 43°39′17″N 70°15′13″W

- Part of the American Revolutionary War
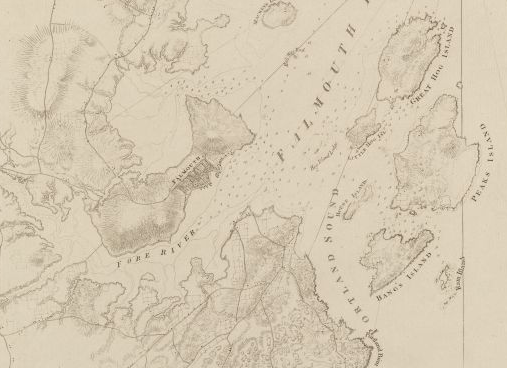
- Detail from a 1777 nautical chart showing Falmouth (now Portland, Maine)
- Date: October 18, 1775
- Location: Falmouth, Massachusetts, United Colonies (present-day Portland, Maine)
- Participants: Henry Mowat

The Burning of Falmouth (October 18, 1775) was an attack by a fleet of Royal Navy vessels on the town of Falmouth, Massachusetts (site of the modern city of Portland, Maine, and not to be confused with the modern towns of Falmouth, Massachusetts, or Falmouth, Maine). The fleet was commanded by Captain Henry Mowat. The attack began with a naval bombardment which included incendiary shot, followed by a landing party meant to complete the town's destruction. The attack was the only major event in what was supposed to be a campaign of retaliation against ports that supported Patriot activities in the early stages of the American Revolutionary War.

Among the colonies, news of the attack led to rejection of British authority and the establishment of independent governments. It also led the Second Continental Congress to contest British naval dominance by forming a Continental Navy. Both Mowat and his superior, Vice-Admiral Samuel Graves, who had ordered Mowat's expedition, suffered professionally as a consequence of the event.

== Background ==
The British army was besieged in Boston after the battles of Lexington and Concord on April 19, 1775. They were supported and supplied by the Royal Navy under the command of Vice-Admiral Samuel Graves, who was under Admiralty instruction to suppress the burgeoning rebellion. Under his orders, vessels were searched for military stores and potential military communications. Laid-up vessels were stripped of their masts and rudders to prevent their use by privateers, and military equipment was salvaged from recent wrecks.

Captain Henry Mowat had been in the port of Falmouth (present-day Portland, Maine) in May 1775 during Thompson's War, when local Patriots captured several ships carrying supplies for Boston and weaponry from Fort Pownall at the mouth of the Penobscot River. Graves ordered Mowat to "lay waste burn and destroy such Sea Port towns as are accessible to His Majesty's ships… and particularly Machias where Margueritta was taken".

== Sailing to Falmouth ==
Mowat left Boston Harbor on October 6, 1775 aboard his 16-gun hydrographic survey sloop HMS Canceaux in company with the 20-gun ship Cat, the 12-gun schooner HMS Halifax, the bomb sloop HMS Spitfire, and the supply ship HMS Symmetry. His instructions were broad in the number of possible targets and he opted against attacks on Cape Ann, where the buildings were too widely spaced for naval cannon fire to be effective. On October 16, he reached the outer parts of Falmouth harbor and anchored there.

The people of Falmouth had mixed reactions to the presence of the British fleet. Some recognized the Canceaux and believed that there was no danger, but militia members remembered Thompson's War and were more suspicious. The next day was windless, so Mowat kedged the ships into the inner harbor and anchored them near the town. He sent one of his lieutenants ashore with a proclamation stating that he was there to "execute a just punishment" due to the inhabitants being "guilty of the most unpardonable Rebellion". He gave the townspeople two hours to evacuate.

As soon as they received this ultimatum, the townspeople sent a deputation (including Dr. Nathaniel Coffin) to plead with Mowat for mercy. He promised to withhold fire if the town swore an oath of allegiance to King George and surrendered all their small arms and powder, along with their gun carriages. In response, the people of Falmouth began to move out of the town. No oaths were sworn; a small number of muskets were surrendered, but no gun carriages.

== Attack ==
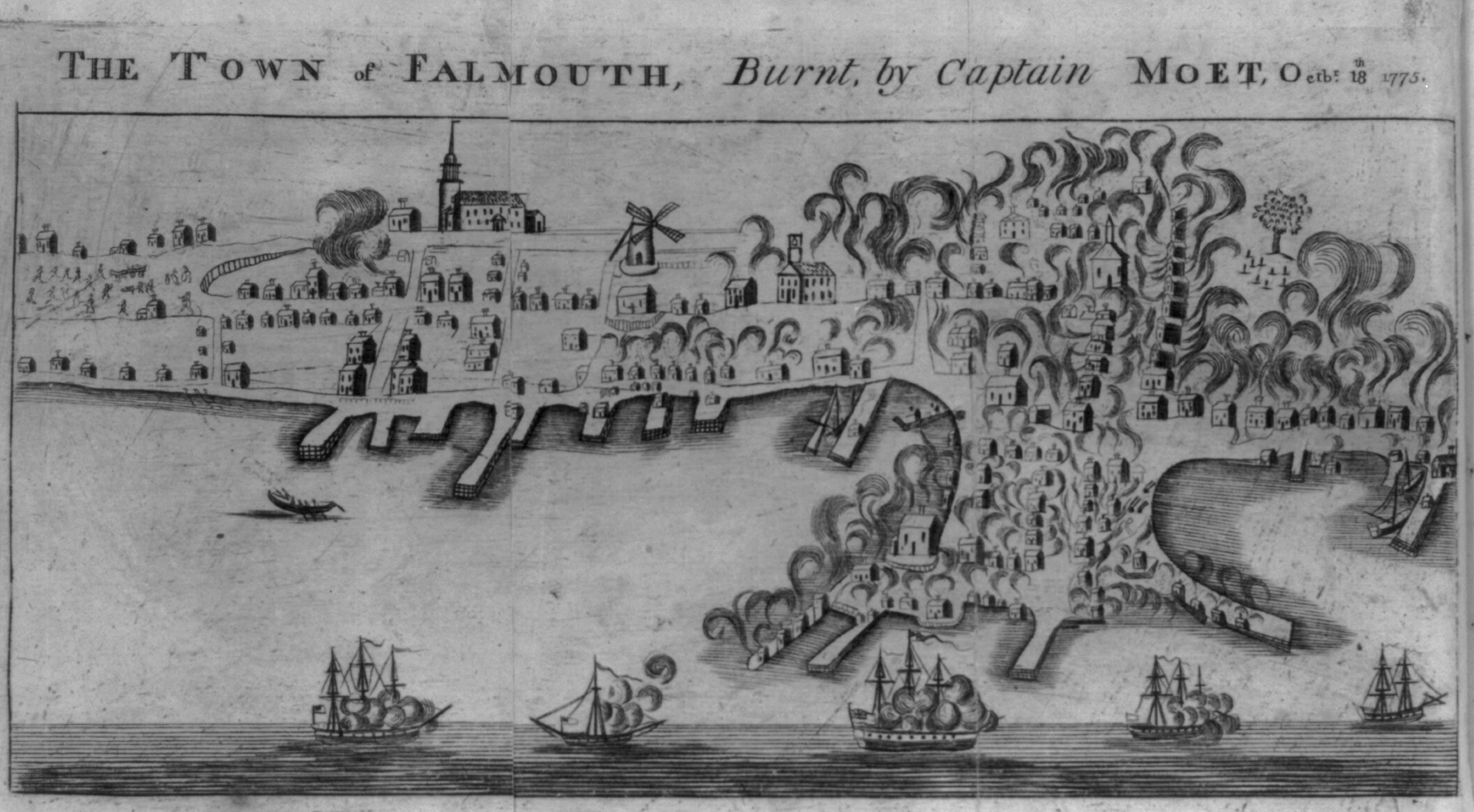
A 1782 engraving depicting the burning of Falmouth

Mowat had set a deadline of 9 am on October 18 for the town's response. By 9:40, the town appeared to be deserted, so he ran a red flag up the Canceaux's masthead and ordered the fleet to begin firing. Incendiary cannonballs set fire to the harbor installations and most of the town's houses and public buildings. One witness reported:

The firing began from all vessels with all possible briskness, discharging on all parts of the town… a horrible shower of balls from three to nine pounds weight, bombs, carcasses, live shells, grapeshot and musketballs.… The firing lasted, with little cessation, until six o'clock.

When the bombardment appeared inadequate to Mowat, he sent a landing party to set fire to any buildings that had survived. The town militia offered little significant resistance, as most were helping their families to safety. In spite of this, some of the landed British marines were killed or wounded. By evening, according to Mowat, "the body of the town was in one flame".

Mowat's bombardment of the town lasted for nine hours in which 3000 projectiles, or one every eleven seconds, were fired at Falmouth.

== Aftermath ==
Following the bombardment, Mowat went on to Boothbay where he set fire to a few houses and raided for livestock, but his expedition was faltering to an end. The decks of some of his ships had been inadequately braced for prolonged gunnery, and many of his guns had jumped their mounts. He returned to Boston and remained there as winter was setting in. Admiral Graves was relieved in December 1775, and these punitive raids were gradually abandoned. One of the last such raids was undertaken to avenge British military losses to the American Patriots, resulting in the burning of Norfolk on January 1, 1776 which was instigated by Lord Dunmore, the Royal Governor of the Colony of Virginia.

=== Damage assessment ===
More than 400 buildings and houses were recorded as damaged or destroyed by fire. In his report to Graves, Mowat stated that 11 small vessels were destroyed in the harbor and four were captured, at the cost of one man killed and one wounded. The people were left to fend for themselves for the winter. A visitor to the town a month later reported that there was "no lodging, eating or housekeeping in Falmouth". This situation is described in the 1825 novel Brother Jonathan by Portland native John Neal.

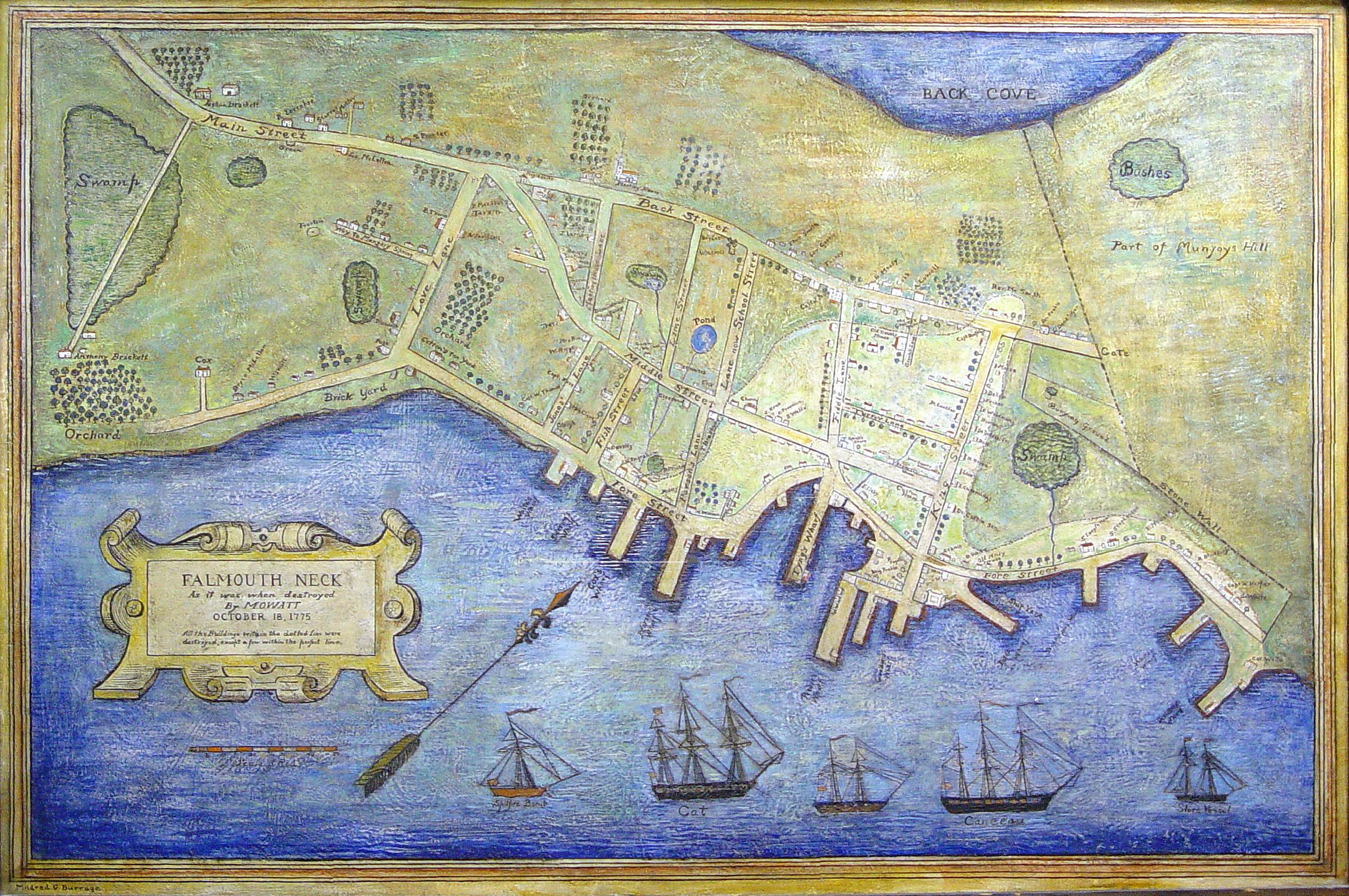
An 1850 map depicting the areas damaged

On October 26, the town formed a committee to raise funds for the distressed families. More than 1,000 people had been left homeless by the raid, including at least 160 families out of an estimated population of 2,500. The Massachusetts Provincial Congress authorized £250 to be paid to the distressed families, and arranged for the distribution of up to 15 bushels of corn to those left destitute. As late as 1779, additional grants were made to needy families in Falmouth. In 1784, the residents of Falmouth built over 40 homes and 10 shops. By 1797, over 400 homes had been built or rebuilt, along with factories, offices, and municipal buildings.

The town of Falmouth accounted losses in the raid at over £50,000. Part of the Falmouth Neck was politically separated in 1786 to form the city of Portland, Maine, but significant recompense was not made until 1791, when Congress granted two tracts of land as compensation. These tracts became the towns of New Portland, Maine and Freeman.

=== Political reaction ===
News of the raid caused uproar in the colonies due to its perceived cruelty. Mowat was denounced as a monster in the Patriot press. The New-England Chronicle argued that "The savage and brutal barbarity of our enemies" proved that Britain was "fully determined with fire and sword, to butcher and destroy, beggar and enslave the whole American people." George Washington was briefed on the attack whilst at his headquarters in Cambridge, Massachusetts. In a letter to John Hancock on 24 October 1775. Washington described the burning of Falmouth as "an Outrage exceeding in Barbarity & Cruelty every hostile Act practised among civilized Nations".

The Massachusetts Provincial Congress authorized the issue of letters of marque, licensing privateer actions against British ships. The Second Continental Congress heard of the event just as word arrived of George III's Proclamation of Rebellion. Outraged by the news, Congress recommended that some provinces adopt self-rule and that British warships in South Carolina be seized. The attack on Falmouth stimulated Congress to advance its plans to establish a Continental Navy. It authorized commissioning two ships on October 30 "for the protection and defense of the united Colonies". The Falmouth incident was again mentioned on November 25, when Congress passed legislation described by John Adams as "the true origin of the American Navy".

When news of the event first reached England, it was dismissed as Patriot propaganda. When the reports were confirmed, Graves' superior, Lord Germain, expressed surprise rather than offense: "I am to suppose that Admiral Graves had good reason for the step he took". This was in spite of orders to not commit such acts unless the town clearly refused to do business with the British. Graves was relieved of his command in December 1775, in part due to his failure to defeat American naval forces. Conciliatory factions of the British press took a skeptical view of the raid on Falmouth, warning that the "Coercive and sanguinary Measures pursued against the Americans... will produce nothing but the bitter Fruit of Ruin, Misery, and Devastation."

News of the event also reached the French government, who were carefully monitoring political developments in North America. The French foreign secretary wrote, "I can hardly believe this absurd as well as barbaric procedure on the part of an enlightened and civilized nation." Mowat's career suffered as a result of his actions. He was repeatedly passed over for promotion, and achieved it only when he downplayed his role in the event or omitted it entirely from his record.

== Similar acts of reprisal ==
On August 30, 1775, Royal Naval Captain James Wallace commanding HMS Rose fired into the town of Stonington, Connecticut after the townspeople there prevented Rose's tender from capturing a vessel that it had chased into the harbor. He did not fire any heated rounds or incendiaries. Wallace also fired on the town of Bristol, Rhode Island in October 1775, after its townspeople refused to deliver livestock to him.

== See also ==
- List of American Revolutionary War battles
