= Henry Mowat =

Royal Navy officer (1734–1798)

Captain Henry Mowat
- Born: 1734; Scotland
- Died: April 14, 1798 (aged 63–64) at sea off Chesapeake Bay
- Military career
- Allegiance: Kingdom of Great Britain
- Branch: Royal Navy
- Service years: 1752–1798
- Rank: Captain
- Commands: HMS Canceaux (1764); HMS Albany (1776); HMS Assistance (1781)
- Conflicts: American Revolutionary War; Thompson's War; Burning of Falmouth; Penobscot Expedition; French Revolutionary Wars; Assistance vs Elizabeth

Henry Mowat (1734–April 14, 1798) was an officer of the Royal Navy commanding ships in northern New England during the American Revolutionary War. He was the son of Captain Patrick Mowat of the post ship HMS Dolphin. He was born in Scotland and went to sea at the age of 18.

== Career ==
After six years as an able seaman and midshipman Mowat was commissioned a lieutenant aboard HMS Baltimore in 1758. In 1764, Lieutenant Mowat was given command of the recently purchased 16-gun sloop HMS Canceaux. Canceaux, with Mowat in command, conducted a hydrographic survey of the coast of North America from the estuary of the Saint Lawrence River to Boston. While so engaged, Mowat was ordered to Portsmouth, New Hampshire in December, 1774, to protect military supplies at Fort William and Mary. Paul Revere alerted the local militia of rumored British seizure of munitions there; gunpowder was removed from the fort by patriots before Mowat arrived, and a colonial maritime pilot ran Canceaux aground in the Piscataqua River estuary. It was several days before the tide refloated Canceaux.

Mowat patrolled the New England coast for smugglers until ordered to Falmouth (present-day Portland, Maine) in March 1775 to assist a loyalist shipbuilder who was attempting to defy the Continental Association boycott on goods manufactured in Great Britain. Mowat was temporarily taken prisoner by militia from Brunswick, Maine, during Thompson's War a few weeks after the battles of Lexington and Concord. Canceaux resumed coastal patrols after Falmouth loyalists negotiated Mowat's release.

Mowat was ordered to undertake a punitive mission following the battle of Machias to "chastize" the seaports of Marblehead, Salem, Gloucester, Ipswich, Newburyport, Portsmouth, Saco, Falmouth, and Machias. Mowat left Boston aboard Canceaux on 6 October 1775 in company with the 20-gun ship Cat, the 12-gun schooner HMS Halifax, the bomb sloop HMS Spitfire and the supply ship HMS Symmetry. Mowat directed the flotilla's 9-hour bombardment in the Burning of Falmouth on 18 October 1775.

In 1779, Mowat was the major instigator of the Battle of Falmouth, not to be confused with the 1775 Burning of Falmouth, which he also participated in. This battle took place on Cape Cod, where he had attempted to seize provisions, but was unsuccessful due to an American militia attacking his raiders. The next day, he attempted to burn down Falmouth, but was repulsed by an earthen fort built overnight.

Mowat was given command of the recently purchased 16-gun sloop HMS Albany in 1776. As captain of Albany, Mowat was the senior officer of a three-ship squadron formed with the 16-gun sloops HMS North and HMS Nautilus to defend Castine, Maine against the Penobscot Expedition. Mowat anchored the sloops so they blocked the harbor entrance while their broadsides could provide mutually supportive fire with British forces ashore. He moved 6-pounder cannon from the unengaged side of his squadron ashore for use by soldiers defending their incomplete fortifications. Mowat's squadron held the harbor against a flotilla of 15 ships mounting 290 guns; and his skillful deployment of naval artillery enabled the outnumbered British force to withstand a siege from 23 July 1779 until reinforcements arrived on 14 August 1779 to defeat the attacking colonial force.

Mowat was promoted to captain and given command of the 50-gun fourth rate ship of the line HMS Assistance in May 1795. Assistance sailed to Halifax Harbour in March, 1796 and captured the 40-gun French frigate Elizabeth on 28 August 1796. Captain Mowat died of apoplexy on 14 April 1798 while Assistance was cruising off Chesapeake Bay. He is buried in the Episcopal churchyard in Hampton, Virginia.

== Legacy ==
A few years before his death, Mowat wrote A Relation of the Services in which I was Engaged in America, from 1759, to the close of the American War in 1783. It was never printed, but was described as a folio in an 1843 London book store advertisement. Late 19th century American historians of the Revolutionary War launched an exhaustive search for the manuscript, including substantial reward offers, in the hope it might provide missing information about the early battles in which Mowat had participated. A manuscript ultimately found in Edinburgh did not meet the mythical expectations evolved through the period of searching. There was no mention of the burning of Falmouth and little new information about the Penobscot expedition.
