= Battle of Machias =

First naval engagement of the American Revolutionary War

Battle of Machias (1775)
- Part of the American Revolutionary War
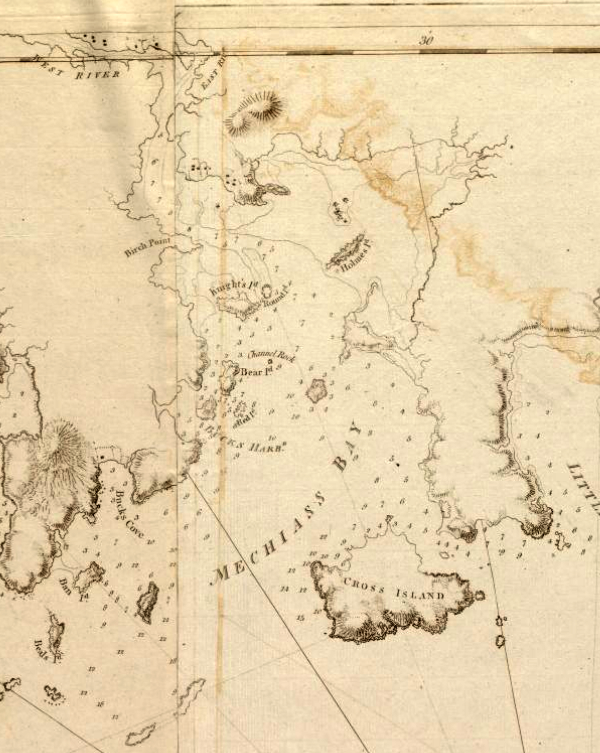
- A 1776 nautical chart of Machias Bay; Machias is at the very top
Date	June 11–12, 1775
Location	Machias, Province of Massachusetts Bay 44°41′04″N 67°22′59″W
Result	American victory

Belligerents
Great Britain	Massachusetts Bay

Commanders and leaders
James Moore †	Jeremiah O'Brien Benjamin Foster

Strength
schooner HMS Margaretta about 40 Royal Navy seamen	Private sloops Unity and Falmouth Packet; 55 Massachusetts militia

Casualties and losses
5 killed 9 wounded	10 killed 3 wounded

The Battle of Machias (June 11–12, 1775) was an early naval engagement of the American Revolutionary War, also known as the Battle of the Margaretta, fought around the port of Machias, Maine.

Following the outbreak of the war, British authorities enlisted Loyalist merchant Ichabod Jones to supply the troops who were under the Siege of Boston. Two of his merchant ships arrived in Machias on June 2, 1775, accompanied by the British armed sloop HMS Margaretta (sometimes also spelled Margueritta or Marguerite), commanded by Midshipman James Moore. The townspeople of Machias disapproved of Jones' intentions and arrested him. They also tried to arrest Moore, but he escaped through the harbor. The townspeople seized one of Jones' ships, armed it alongside a second local ship, and sailed out to meet Moore. After a short confrontation, Moore was fatally wounded, and his vessel and crew were captured.

The people of Machias captured additional British ships, and fought off a large force that tried to take control of the town in the Battle of Machias in 1777. Privateers and others forces operating out of Machias continued to attack British targets throughout the war.

== Background ==
The American Revolutionary War began on April 19, 1775, with the Battles of Lexington and Concord in the Province of Massachusetts Bay, after which the Continental Army under the command of George Washington besieged the British army in the Siege of Boston. The besieged British were led by General Thomas Gage and Admiral Samuel Graves, and both did business with the people of Machias. Gage required lumber to build barracks for the additional troops arriving in the besieged city, and Graves wanted to recover the guns from the HMS Halifax shipwreck, which had been intentionally run aground in Machias Bay by a local pilot in February 1775. The ship's guns were reported to be of interest to the Patriots of Machias.

Graves authorized Machias merchant Ichabod Jones to carry flour and other food supplies to Machias aboard his ships Unity and Polly, which would be exchanged for Gage's needed lumber. To guarantee that this trade would happen, Graves also sent Midshipman James Moore from his flagship HMS Preston to command the armed schooner HMS Margaretta and accompany the two merchant vessels. Moore had additional orders to retrieve what he could from the wreck of HMS Halifax.

== Arrival at Machias ==
On June 2, 1775, Jones' ships arrived in the port at Machias. However, they were met with resistance from the townspeople when Jones refused to sell his pork and flour unless he was allowed to load lumber for Boston. In a meeting on June 6, 1775, the townspeople voted against doing business with Jones. The hostile climate forced Jones to take action by ordering Moore to bring Margaretta within firing distance of the town. The threat prompted the townspeople to meet for a second time, and they voted to permit trade. Unity was docked at the wharf to begin unloading the supplies.

Following the vote, Jones announced that he would only do business with those who had voted in favor of trade. This angered those who had voted against trade. As a result, Colonel Benjamin Foster, a local militia leader, conspired with militia from neighboring towns to capture Jones. This was inspired by the actions of the Brunswick militiamen in Thompson's War a month earlier. Foster's plan was to seize Jones at church on June 11, but the plan failed when Jones noticed the group of men approaching the building. Moore managed to get back to his ship, while Jones escaped into the woods and did not emerge until two days later.

The men of Machias regrouped the next day, and Foster took around 20 men, including his brother, Wooden Foster, to East Machias where they seized Unity and constructed deck breastworks to serve as protection. They also commandeered a local schooner named Falmouth Packet.

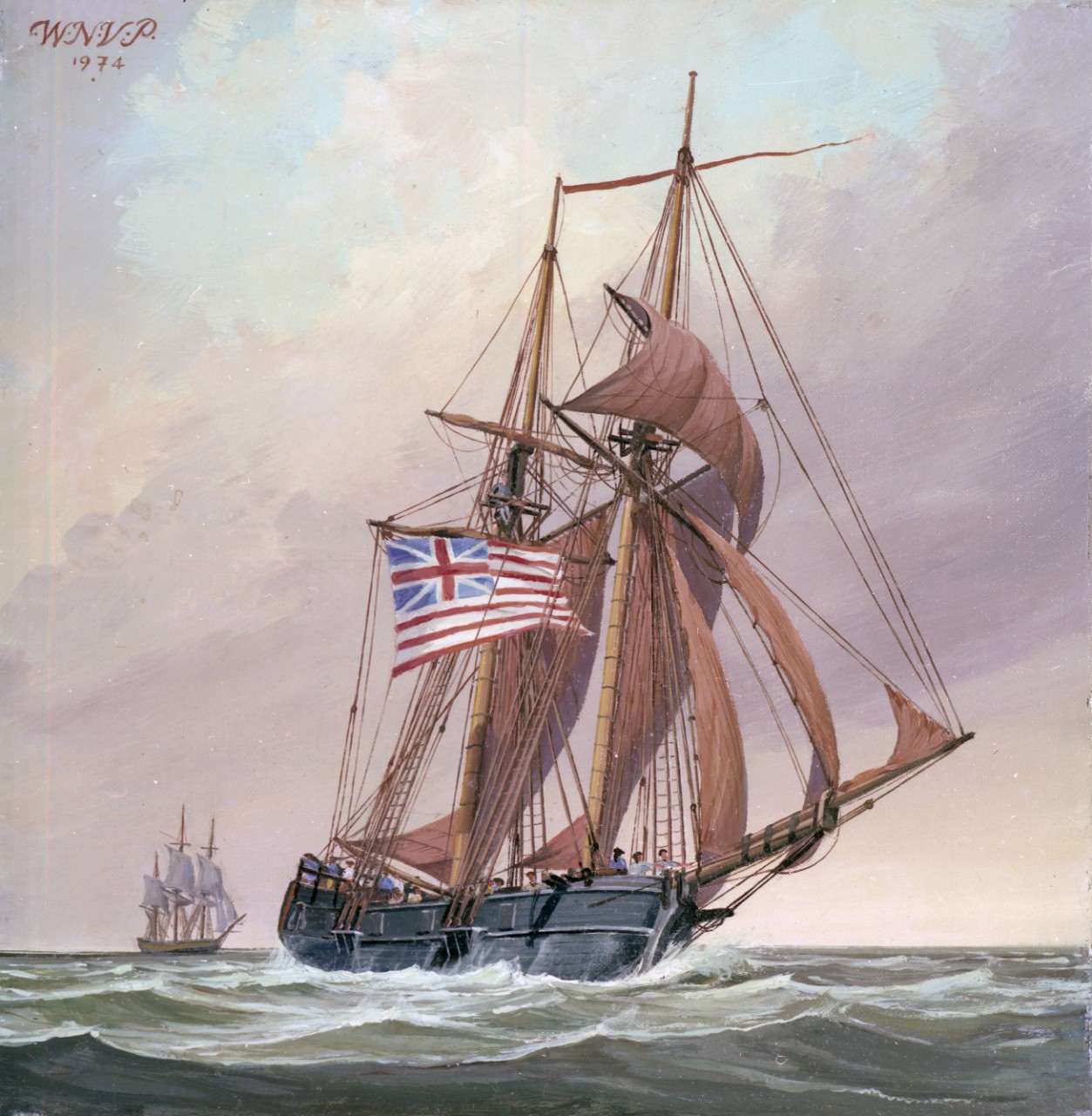
Margaretta was likely smaller than this schooner, USS Wasp.

The other militiamen traveled on land to find the place where Margaretta was anchored and demanded surrender. After refusing to surrender, Moore sailed to where Polly was anchored and attempted to recover her. There was an inconsequential exchange of gunfire with the militia men who were located on the shore, and Moore was able to raise anchor and travel to a safe anchorage. The remaining men armed themselves with muskets, pitchforks, and axes to set out after Margaretta.

== Conflict - capture of Margaretta ==
After escaping the Machias men, Margaretta was forced to jibe into brisk winds, which resulted in the main boom and gaff breaking away, crippling its navigability. Once Moore was in Holmes Bay he captured a sloop and took its spar and gaff to replace Margaretta's. Moore also took its pilot, Robert Avery, captive. Unity's crew of about 30 Machias men elected Jeremiah O'Brien as their captain and sailed out to chase down Margaretta. Since Unity was a much faster sailing vessel, O'Brien's crew quickly caught up to the crippled Margaretta, while Falmouth Packet lagged behind.

Upon seeing Unity approaching, Moore opened full sail and cut away his boats in an attempt to escape. As Unity pulled closer, Moore opened fire. Unity managed to avoid damage and pulled alongside Margaretta. Led by Joseph Getchell and O'Brien's brother, John, Unity's crew stormed on board. Both sides exchanged musket shots as Moore tossed hand grenades onto Unity. Moore was taken down by Samuel Watts with a musket shot to the chest. Once Falmouth Packet caught up to the attack, it managed to pull along the other side of Moore's ship. With the combination of both crews, they were able to overwhelm Margaretta.

== Aftermath of 1775 engagement ==
Since Moore was grievously wounded in the battle, his second-in-command, Midshipman Richard Stillingfleet, surrendered the crew and the vessel. Moore was taken back to Machias and put into the care of Ichabod Jones's nephew, Stephen Jones. However, Moore's wounds were too severe and he died the following day. Three other members of Moore's crew were killed, including Robert Avery. The remaining crew members of the British schooner were held at Machias for a month, then handed over to the Massachusetts Provincial Congress. Reports circulated that as many as 100 British men died in the battle. Machias lost two men, John McNiell and James Coolbroth, and three others were badly wounded: John Berry, who had a musket ball enter his mouth and exit behind his ear, Isaac Taft, and James Cole.

The residents of Machias expected British retaliation, and immediately petitioned to the Massachusetts Provincial Congress for guidance, supplies, and assistance. The Provincial Congress organized the defense of Machias and remained vigilant. Jeremiah O'Brien immediately outfitted one of the three captured vessels with breastwork, and armed it with long guns and swivel guns taken from Margaretta, and changed its name to Machias Liberty. In July 1775, O'Brien and Benjamin Foster captured two more British armed schooners, Diligent and Tatamagouche. The ships' officers had been captured when they came ashore near Bucks Harbor. The Provincial Congress formally recognized O'Brien and Foster's efforts by commissioning both Machias Liberty and Diligent into the Massachusetts State Navy with O'Brien as their commander in August 1775. British retaliation did not occur until October 18, 1775, with the burning of Falmouth.

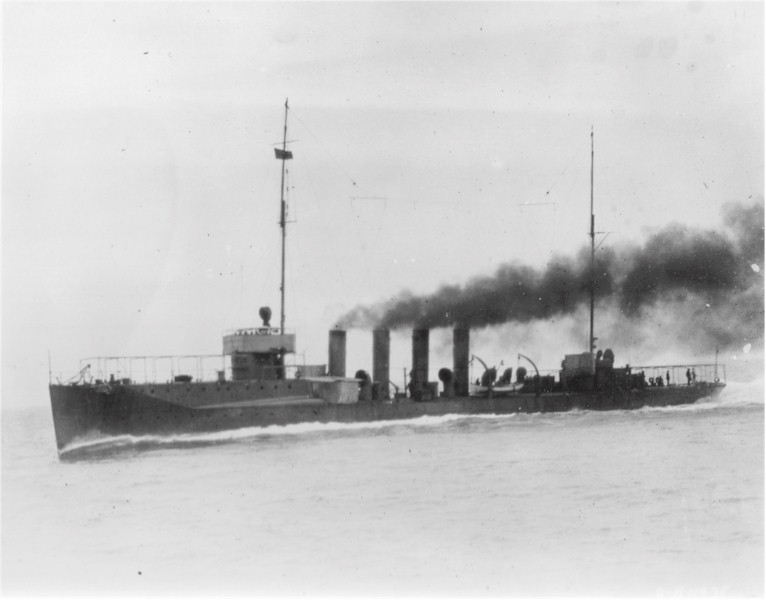
USS O'Brien, launched in 1914, is one of several ships named for Jeremiah O'Brien.

=== Lead up to 1777 ===
Following rumors of a planned American assault on Nova Scotia, a small British fleet carrying 1,000 men attempted to capture Machias. The battle took place on August 13, 1777, and continued until the next day. Local residents were able to successfully fight off the attackers with the help of Indian allies; both sides suffered minor casualties. The rumors of the assault on Nova Scotia ended up being only partly true since no significant military planning had taken place.

=== General Naval Support & Privateering ===
During the war, Machias men refitted and armed a variety of ships—including Margaretta—and used them to attack British targets. Machias Liberty and Diligent were used to intercept merchant ships that were supplying the British army during the siege of Boston. O'Brien and John Lambert built a 20-gun ship and began privateering under a letter of marque. Both men were commissioned into the Continental Navy for their work. O'Brien was captured off the coast of New York in late 1777, but was able to escape from prison in Britain and continued privateering throughout the war.

The Royal Navy was continually frustrated by the use of Machias as a staging point for American attacks against Nova Scotia. Samuel Graves ordered Sir George Collier to destroy Machias in 1777. Graves attempted to capture Machias multiple times, but had no success.

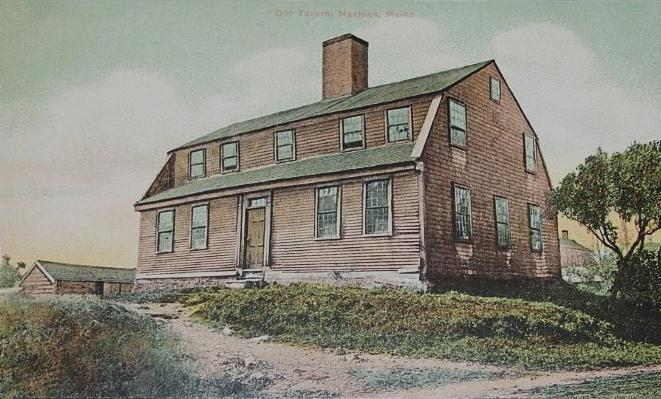
The Burnham Tavern in a 1911 postcard

== Liberty pole story ==
There is a widely told story that Machias men erected a Liberty pole after meeting in the Burnham Tavern to discuss the battles of Lexington and Concord. This story, which persists in modern history books and travel guides, has been shown to be an 1831 fabrication by Machias resident John O'Brien. There is no mention of the Liberty pole in any earlier accounts, including the official report sent by the residents of Machias in 1775, and the letters of other participants in the events.

== See also ==
- List of American Revolutionary War battles
