= Samuel Graves =

Royal Navy officer (1713–1787)

Admiral Samuel Graves
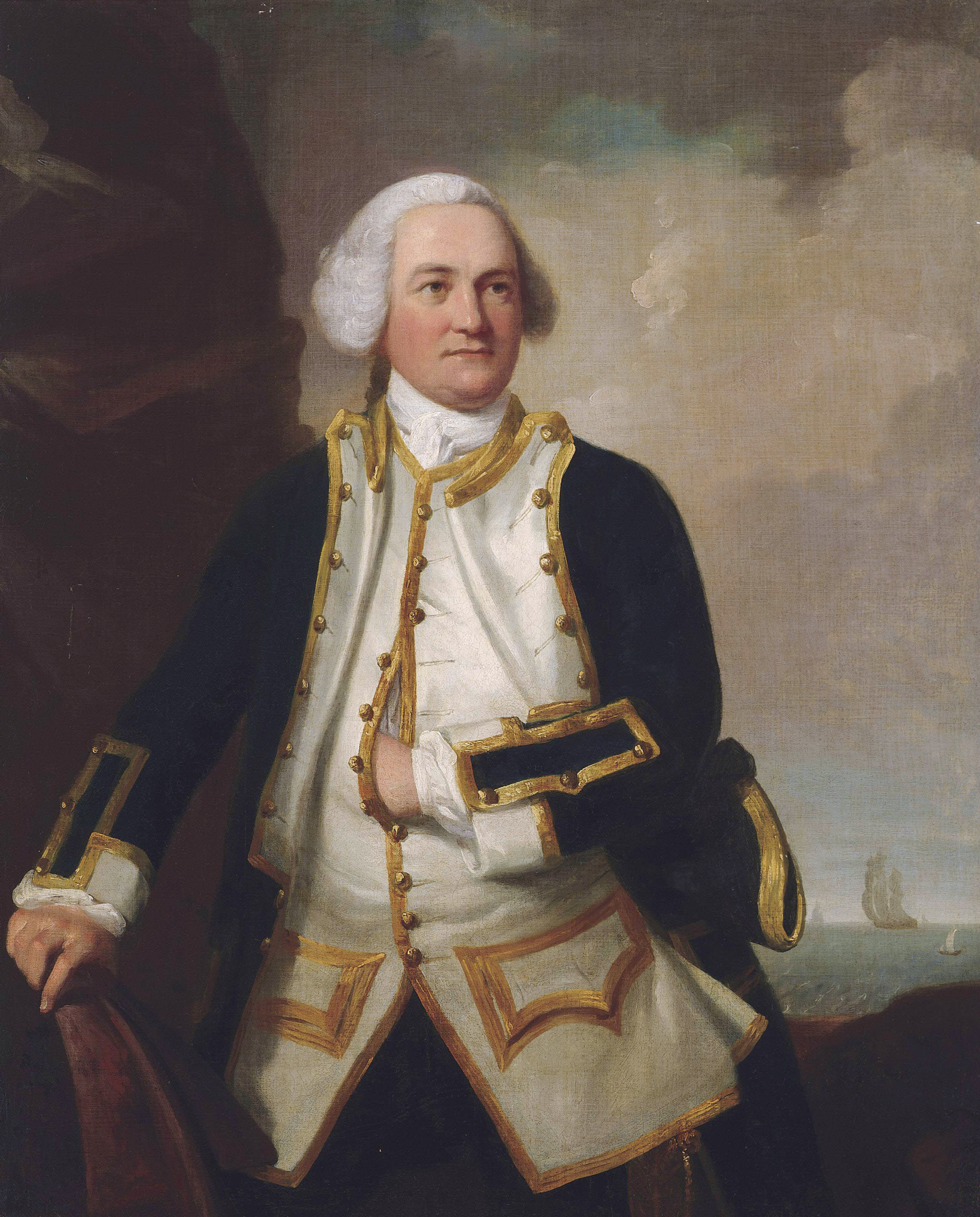
- Portrait by James Northcote
- Born: 17 April 1713; Castledawson, Ireland
- Died: 8 March 1787 (aged 73); Devon, England
- Military career
- Allegiance: Great Britain
- Branch: Royal Navy
- Rank: Admiral
- Commands: North American Station
- Conflicts: Seven Years' War; American War of Independence

Admiral Samuel Graves (17 April 1713 – 8 March 1787) was a Royal Navy officer who served in the Seven Years' War and American War of Independence.

== Ancestry ==
He is thought to have been born in Castledawson, Ireland. His grandfather, Captain James Graves (1654–1689), was murdered in his bed and robbed of his regiment's wages. Samuel Graves was born the youngest son and presumably the second youngest child of Captain Graves' son Samuel Graves (1674–1727) and his wife Jane Moore. He had three older brothers and a sister.

By joining the Royal Navy, he followed in the footsteps of his uncle Thomas Graves, whose son Thomas Graves is most well known for having commanded the British fleet at the Battle of the Chesapeake during the American War of Independence. Another Thomas Graves, a nephew of Samuel Graves, was knighted following the Battle of Copenhagen in 1801, where he had served as Horatio Nelson's second-in-command. Many Graveses served in the Royal Navy during the 18th and early 19th centuries.

== Military career ==
Graves joined the Royal Navy in 1732. Made lieutenant in 1739, he participated in the 1741 expedition against Cartagena, serving on the frigate Norfolk, under his uncle and future admiral, Captain Thomas Graves. Samuel Graves's cousin Thomas, Captain Graves's son and also future admiral, served alongside him on the third-rate ship-of-the-line Norfolk. Promoted to command of the sloop Bonetta in 1743, Graves served in the West Indies until 1747, commanding Ripon's Prize, and, later, Enterprise.

=== Seven Years' War ===
In 1756 Graves rose to command the Duke. Two years later, Graves returned to the command of Duke, serving again under Hawke in the Battle of Quiberon Bay on 20 November 1759. He continued in command of the Duke until his promotion to rear admiral in October 1762.

That same year, Graves faced several lawsuits when the conduct of a press-gang sent out by him was deemed excessively brutal by the townspeople of Bristol. Seeing as a by-election was held at the same time, the local Tories suspected him of having purposefully and unlawfully impressed eligible voters to influence the election on behalf of the Whigs.

=== American Revolutionary War ===
In October 1770 Graves rose to vice admiral, and in July 1774 assumed command of the North American Station. Graves's orders were vague, his resources overstretched, and his task, in the words of the Dictionary of National Biography, "perhaps the most ungracious duty that has ever fallen to the lot of a naval officer." According to his instructions, Graves was charged with supporting customs officials enforcing the various revenue and trade acts governing North American colonial trade within the empire, especially the Boston Port Act. With only 26 ships and over one-thousand miles of coastline from Nova Scotia to Florida to patrol, Graves's task was Sisyphean.

Manning problems made the Royal Navy's problems even more acute, thus forcing it to resort to press gangs in order to supplement the ships' slender crews. Compounding the problem was the attitude and behavior of Navy officers who did not recognize local authority and were more often contemptuous of local officials and sensitivities.

Headquartered in Boston, Graves was at the center of the Revolutionary turmoil in New England. His sailors manned the boats that ferried British soldiers across the Charles River en route to Concord on the night of 18 April 1775. Two months later, on 17 June 1775, his sailors again helped ferry troops, this time to the Charlestown Peninsula, while several of his ships provided fire support for the pyrrhic victory at Bunker Hill. During the Siege of Boston, Admiral Graves, on 6 October 1775, ordered Lieutenant Henry Mowatt, commanding the armed vessel HMS Canceaux, to destroy seaports that were supporting the rebellion. Mowatt burned Falmouth (today's Portland, Maine) on 18 October.

Graves' position in Boston was tenuous; his relationship with General Gage was characterised by a strong mutual dislike which at the time was rumoured to at least partially result from a dispute between their wives Margaret Graves and Margaret Kemble Gage, who reportedly had fallen out over the question whether dancing should be allowed at a card-party or not. The trifling nature of their dispute aside, both women were staunch partisans of their husbands to the point that contemporaries mused both were "led", and thus presumably influenced in their capacities as military commanders, by their wives.

Shortly before the Burning of Falmouth in August 1775, Graves was involved in a public fistfight with Commissioner of Customs Benjamin Hallowell, the climax of an ongoing dispute between the two concerning the hay to be harvested on a small island off Boston. There are at least two accounts of the affair, one written by Hallowell himself addressed to General Gage and one by an anonymous eyewitness, published in a British newspaper. According to the eyewitness' account, Hallowell confronted Graves on the street, demanding to know why the latter had not replied to his letters. From there, the situation escalated fairly quickly. Despite being a good deal older than Hallowell, Graves apparently beat Hallowell so badly, bystanders interceded to separate the two men to prevent any more serious harm from being done. This episode supported Graves' image as "somewhat severe, of few words, and rough in his manner", inspired satirical poetry and brought him into further disrepute as some of his nephews took it upon themselves to punish Hallowell for having assailed their uncle by subjecting him to a beating and challenging him to a duel.

On 27 January 1776, Molyneux Shuldham succeeded Graves as commander-in-chief of the North American station. Graves sailed for England on 2 February 1776 onboard HMS Preston without a command. In September 1777 he declined command of Plymouth, but indicated a desire to return to active duty. Graves advanced to admiral of the blue on 29 January 1778, admiral of the white on 8 April 1782, and died at his estate near Hembury Fort, Honiton, Devon on 8 March 1787. He is buried in Dunkeswell in Devon with a monument designed by "Miss Burgess" and sculpted by John Bacon.

== Family ==
Graves settled at Hembury Fort House in Devon. His first marriage was to Elizabeth Sedgwick (1729–1767), daughter of John Sedgwick of Staindrop in County Durham on 19 June 1750 in the parish of St. George, Hanover Square.

Two years after Elizabeth's death in 1767, he married Margaret Spinckes (1728-1808) in All Saints' Church in Aldwincle, Northamptonshire on 14 June 1769.

Both marriages remained childless. Through his second wife however, he became involved in raising the latter's orphaned niece Elizabeth Posthuma Gwillim, who became like his own daughter to him. Graves showed particular interest in two of his nephews, Richard (his godson) and Thomas Graves. He also played an influential part in the life of another godson, John Graves Simcoe. When Simcoe, who had fought in the American War of Independence, was invalided back to England on account of his precarious health, Graves offered his godson to convalesce at Hembury Fort House for a while where he met Graves' ward Elizabeth Posthuma Gwillim. The young couple married on 30 December 1782 in St. Mary and St. Giles Church, Buckerell with Samuel and Margaret Graves (godfather to the groom and godmother to the bride respectively) as witnesses.

A monument sculpted by John Bacon but designed by a "Miss Burgess" was erected in Buckerell in his memory. "Miss Burgess" was most likely Mary Anne Burges, best friend to Samuel Graves' ward Elizabeth Posthuma Gwillim, who was close with her friends' aunt and uncle through being a frequent visitor to Hembury Fort House. The epitaph inscribed on the aforementioned monument also refers to Graves' charitable efforts, which awarded him the local epithet "The Poor Man's Friend".

== Bibliography ==
- Laughton, John Knox (1890). "Graves, Samuel" . Dictionary of National Biography. Vol. 22. pp. 437–438.
- Miller, Nathan (1974). Sea of Glory: The Continental Navy fights for Independence 1775–1783. New York: David McKay. ISBN 978-0-679-50392-7. OCLC 844299.

Military offices
Preceded by John Montagu	Commander-in-Chief, North American Station; 1774–1776	Succeeded by Molyneux Shuldham
