= HMS Halifax (1768) =

1765 schooner

Coordinates: 44.5899°N 67.3932°W

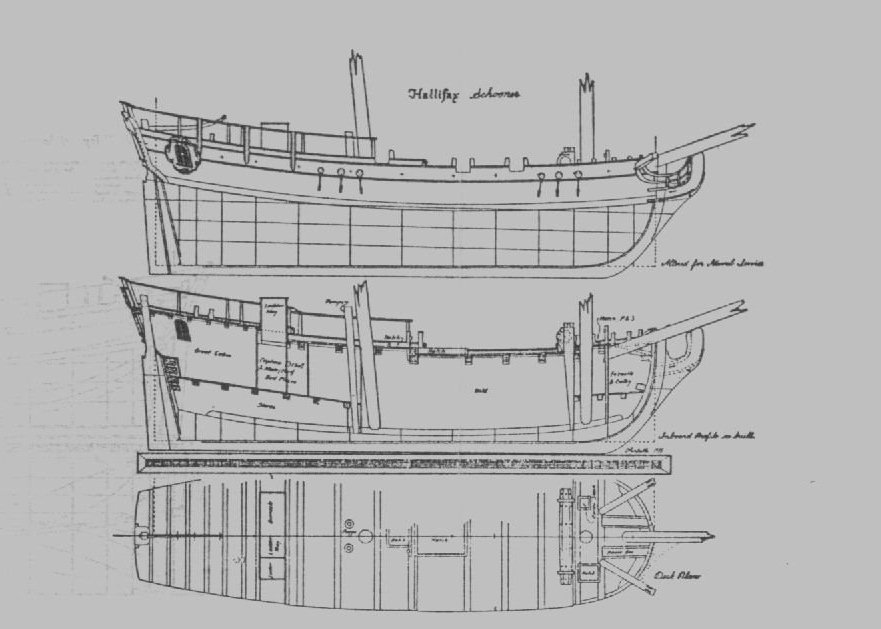
- Plans of HMS Halifax by Howard I. Chapelle

History

Great Britain
- Name: Nova Scotia Packet
- Port of registry: Halifax, Nova Scotia
- Launched: Halifax, NS, September 1765
- Maiden voyage: Halifax to Boston, 15 October 1765
- Fate: Sold to Admiralty in October 1768

Great Britain
- Name: HMS Halifax
- Acquired: October 1768
- Fate: Wrecked on 15 February 1775

General characteristics
- Tons burthen: 83 4/94 bm
- Length: 58 ft 3 in (17.8 m) (on deck); 46 ft 10.5 in (14.3 m) (keel)
- Beam: 18 ft 3 in (5.6 m)
- Depth of hold: 8 ft 10 in (2.69 m)
- Propulsion: Sail
- Sail plan: Square Topsail schooner
- Complement: 30
- Armament: 6 × 3-pdrs; 8 (later 12) × 1/2-pdr swivels

HMS Halifax was a schooner built for merchant service at Halifax, Nova Scotia, in 1765 that the British Royal Navy purchased in 1768 for coastal patrol in North America in the years just prior to the American Revolution. She is one of the best documented schooners from early North America.

== Packet ship ==
The schooner was built by a group of Halifax merchants with government support as the Nova Scotia Packet, to establish a reliable packet service of mail and passengers between Halifax and Boston in 1765. The managing owner was, Joseph Grey, the son in law of the commissioner of the Halifax Naval Yard where the schooner was likely built. Launched in late September 1765, the schooner made her first voyage on 15 October 1765 under the command of Benjamin Green Jnr. Weather permitting, the packet sailed every eight days between Halifax and Boston and made 23 round trips during her merchant career. In July 1768, the Nova Scotia Packet was chartered by Commodore Samuel Hood in Halifax to take dispatches to Portsmouth, England. Hood also recommended that the schooner be purchased by the British Royal Navy.

== HMS Halifax ==
The Royal Navy purchased the schooner on 12 October 1768 and renamed her Halifax; she met a need for more coastal patrol schooners to combat smuggling and deal with colonial unrest in New England. The careful record of her lines and construction by Portsmouth dockyard naval architects, and the detailed record of her naval service, make the schooner a much-studied example of early schooners in North America.

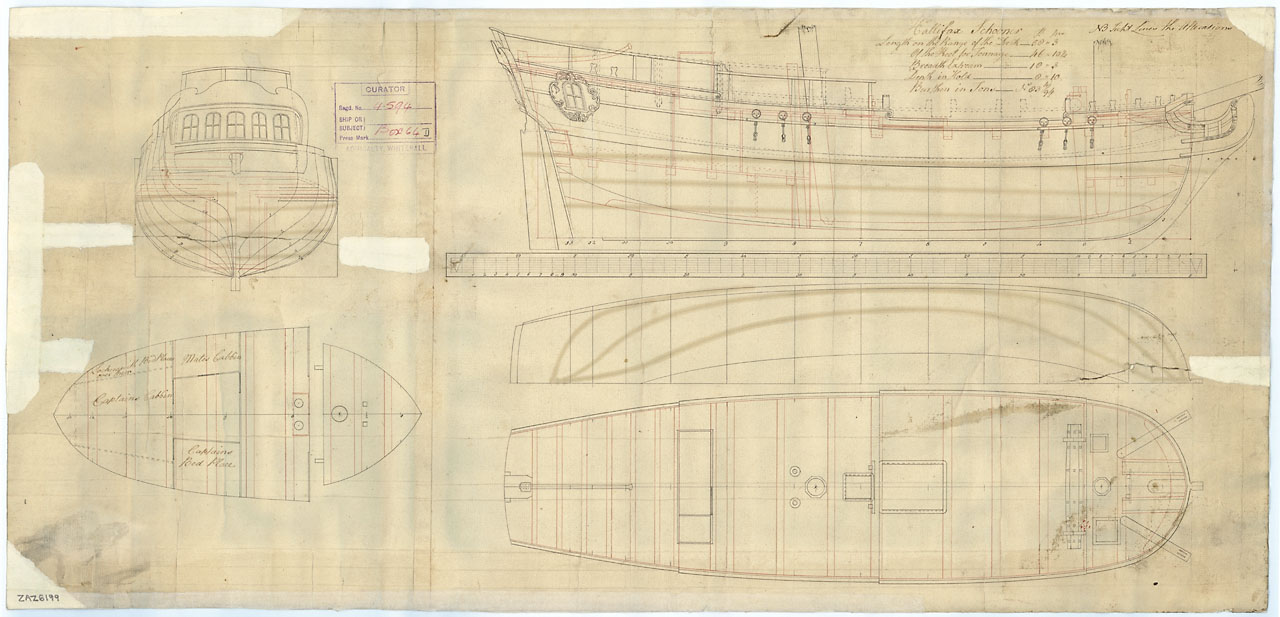
Original Royal Navy plans of HMS Halifax

After being surveyed in September 1768 she was commissioned in October and fitted out at Portsmouth between October and December. Her first commander was Lieutenant Samuel Scott, who sailed her back to North America in January 1769. In 1769 Halifax confiscated and towed the schooner Liberty, later HMS Liberty, belonging to John Hancock. Halifax returned to Britain for a refit in December 1770, and the following year was under the command of Lieutenant Abraham Crespin. Lieutenant Jacob Rogers took command in 1773, and was succeeded in 1774 by Lieutenant Joseph Nunn. In December 1774-January 1775 reported as leaky, in poor repair and unfit for service. Ordered anchored in port to be surveyed in the Spring.

== Loss ==
After an active career on the coast on North America she was wrecked in a gale at 3 A.M. 15 February 1775 at Foster Island near Machias, Maine. That night she went to pieces in a snowstorm. She was reportedly intentionally run aground by a local pilot. The court martial of Nunn, his officers, and crew, attributed the loss to the pilot's ignorance; nothing came of this as the pilot had disappeared while Nunn was arranging transport from Sheep's Island to Boston for his crew with a local shipowner, Mr. Beale.

The wreck played a role in the Battle of Machias later that year, when Admiral Samuel Graves ordered that her guns be recovered. A later schooner named Halifax serving in North America was recorded as being purchased in 1775, though her lines were identical to the Halifax sunk that year, and she may therefore have been salvaged and returned to service.
