= Carcass (projectile) =

Early form of incendiary bomb or shell

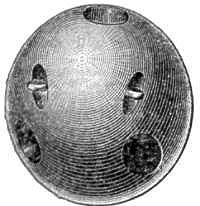
Drawing of a carcass shell

A carcass was an early form of incendiary bomb or shell, intended to set targets on fire. It comprised an external casing, usually of cast iron, filled with a highly flammable mixture, and having three to five holes through which the burning filling could blaze outward. Carcasses were shot from howitzers, mortars, and other cannons to set fire to buildings and defences; on impact, the shell shattered, spreading its incendiary filling around the target. Congreve rockets were also sometimes fitted with carcass heads.

They were named carcass because the circles which pass from one ring, or plate, to the other, were thought to resemble the ribs of a human carcass.

== History ==
Carcasses were used for the first time by the French and Münsterite troops under Louis XIV and Bernard von Galen in 1672. They were also fired from bomb vessels.

The carcass shell as used by the Royal Navy in the 18th and early 19th century, most famously in the Bombardment of Fort McHenry in 1814, was a hollow cast iron sphere weighing 190 pounds (86 kg). Instead of the single fuse hole found on a conventional mortar shell of the period, the carcass had 3 openings, each 3 inches (76 mm) in diameter. Its filling burned for 11 minutes upon firing. It was especially useful during night bombardments, as the burning projectile assisted in the aiming of the cannon.

== Composition ==
For the composition of the flammable material used in a carcass, 18th century philosopher Christian Wolff prescribed 10 parts of pounded gunpowder, 2 of nitre, 1 of sulfur, and 1 of colophony; or 6 of gunpowder, 4 of nitre, 4 of sulfur, 1 of beaten glass, 0.5 of antimony 0.5 of camphor, 1 of sal ammoniac, and 0.25 of common salt. For the shell, he started with two iron rings (others used plates), fitting one at one extreme, near the aperture at which the carcass was to be fired, and the other at the other. These he braced with cords drawn lengthwise; and across these, at right angles, laced other cords, making a knot at each intersection. Between the folds of the cords, he made holes, inserted copper tubes, and filled them half full of powder and lead bullets, packing it in with a tow. The internal shell's aperture was then plugged up, and it was immersed in a mixture of 4 parts of melted pitch, 20 of rosin, 1 of oil of turpentine, and as much ground gunpowder as was needed to reduce it to the consistency of a paste. After immersion, the shell was to be covered with tow, and immersed again, until it was the proper size for the mortar.

Carcass shells as used by the Royal Navy from the 18th to the 19th centuries were filled with a mixture of saltpeter, sulfur, rosin, sulfide of antimony, tallow and turpentine.

== See also ==
- Napalm
- Incendiary bomb
- Greek fire
