= Naval artillery in the Age of Sail =

The Age of Sail encompasses the period of roughly 1571–1862, when large, sail-powered wooden naval warships dominated the high seas, mounting a large variety of types and sizes of cannon as their main armament. By modern standards, these naval artillery pieces were extremely inefficient, difficult to load, and short ranged. These characteristics, along with the handling and seamanship of the ships that mounted them, defined the environment in which the naval tactics in the Age of Sail developed.

== Firing ==
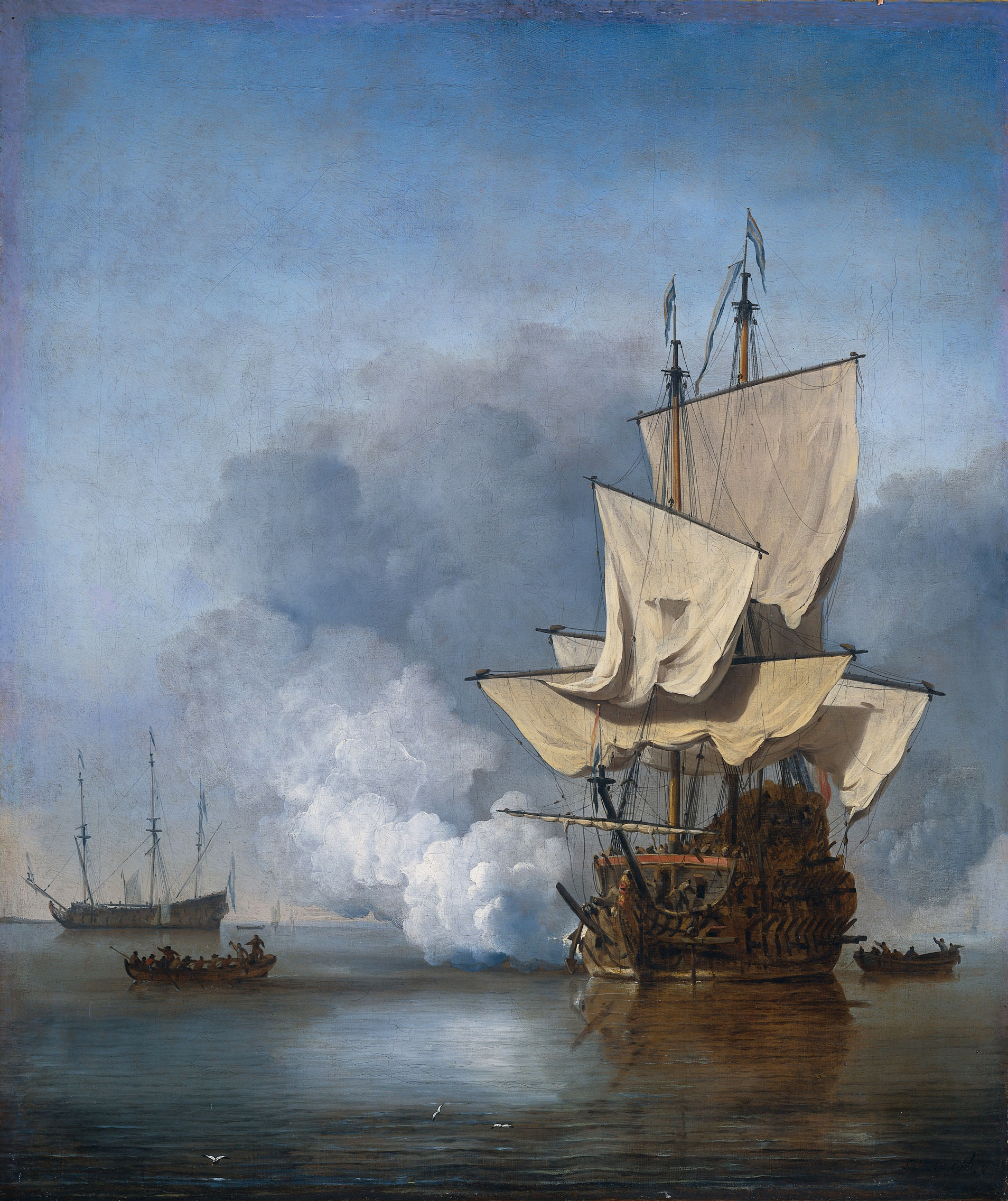
The cannon shot (c. 1680), painted by Willem van de Velde the Younger

Essential parts of a cannon: 1. the projectile or cannonball (shot); 2. gunpowder; 3. touch hole (or vent) in which the fuse or other ignition device is inserted

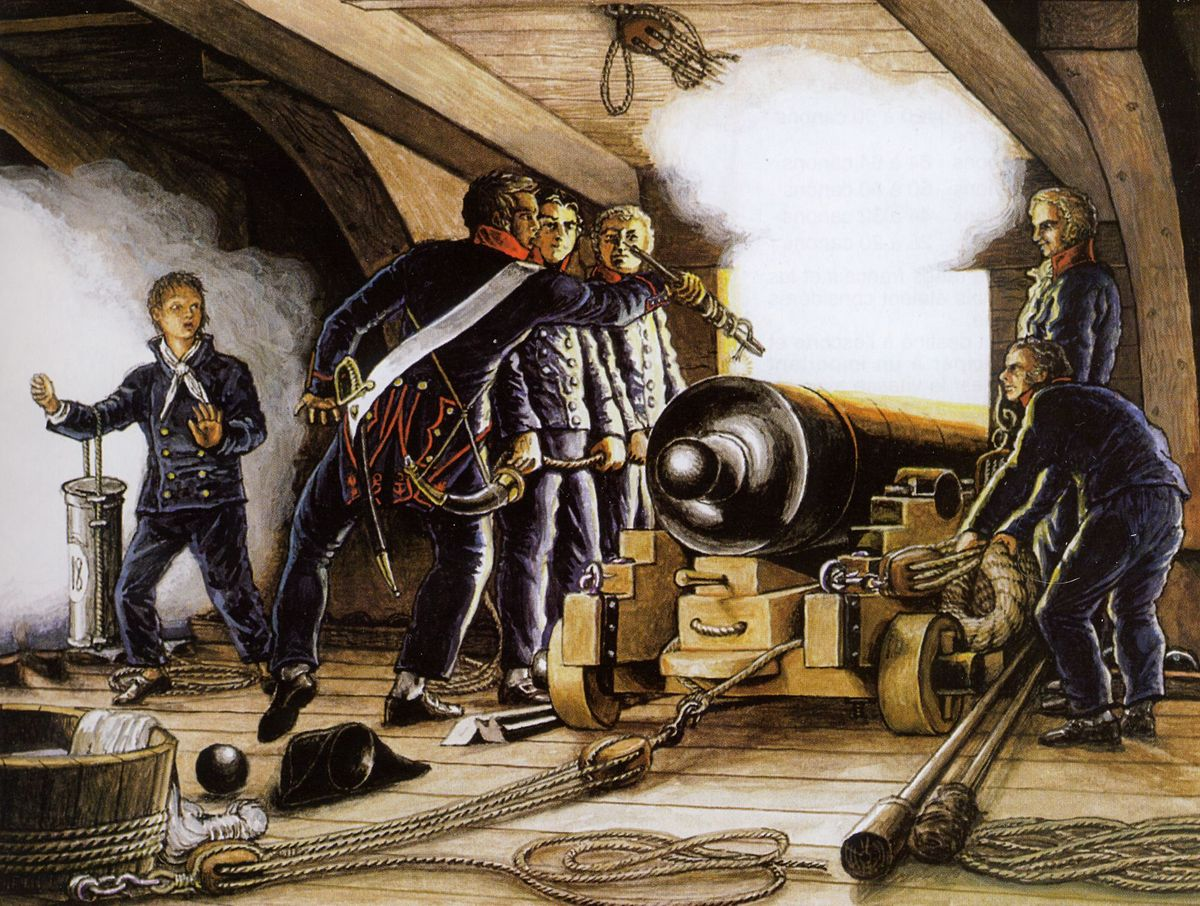
Firing of an 18-pounder aboard a French ship

Firing a naval cannon required a great amount of labour and manpower. The propellant was gunpowder, whose bulk had to be kept in the magazine, a special storage area below deck for safety. Powder boys, typically 10–14 years old, were enlisted to run powder from the magazine up to the gun decks of a vessel as required.

A typical firing procedure follows. A wet swab was used to mop out the interior of the barrel, extinguishing any embers from a previous firing which might set off the next charge of gunpowder prematurely. Gunpowder was placed in the barrel, either loose or in a cloth or parchment cartridge pierced by a metal 'pricker' through the touch hole, and followed by a cloth wad (typically made from canvas and old rope), then rammed home with a rammer. Next the shot was rammed in, followed by another wad to prevent the cannonball from rolling out of the barrel if the muzzle was depressed. The gun in its carriage was then 'run out'; men heaved on the gun tackles until the front of the gun carriage was hard up against the ship's bulwark, the barrel protruding out of the gun port. This took the majority of the gun crew manpower, as the weight of a large cannon in its carriage could total over two tons, and the ship would probably be rolling.

The touch hole in the rear (breech) of the cannon was primed with finer gunpowder (priming powder) or from a quill (from a porcupine or the skin-end of a feather) pre-filled with priming powder, then ignited.

The earlier method of firing a cannon was to apply a linstock—a wooden staff holding a length of smoldering match at the end—to the touch-hole of the gun. This was dangerous and made accurate shooting difficult from a moving ship, as the gun had to be fired from the side to avoid its recoil, and there was a noticeable delay between the application of the linstock and the gun firing. In 1745, the British began using gunlocks (flintlock mechanisms fitted to cannon).

The gunlock, by contrast, was operated by pulling a cord or lanyard. The gun lock was a larger version of the flintlock mechanism used on pistols and muskets and was screwed onto the gun, next to the ignition vent. The cannon was fired by a piece of flint being held by the hammer connected to a mainspring, when the firing cord was pulled the hammer was released, the spring propelled the hammer forward causing the flint to strike a piece of steel called the frizzen, causing sparks which ignited a small amount of gunpowder in the flash pan, thereby igniting the main powder charge in the cannon barrel. The gun-captain could stand behind the gun, safely beyond its range of recoil, and sight along the barrel, firing when the roll of the ship lined the gun up with the enemy, and so reduce the chance of the shot hitting the sea or flying high over the enemy's deck. Despite their advantages, gunlocks spread gradually as they could not be retrofitted to older simple fuse cannons, due to their large difference in design and operation. The British adopted them faster than the French, who had still not generally adopted them by the time of the Battle of Trafalgar (1805), placing them at a disadvantage, as the new technology was in general use by the Royal Navy at this time. After the introduction of gunlocks, linstocks were retained, but only as a backup means of firing.

The linstock slow match or the spark from the flintlock ignited the priming powder, which in turn set off the main charge, which propelled the shot out of the barrel. When the gun discharged, the recoil sent it backwards until it was stopped by the breech rope, a sturdy rope made fast to ring bolts let into the bulwarks, with a turn taken about the gun's cascabel (the knob at the end of the gun barrel).

A typical broadside of a Royal Navy ship of the late 18th century could be fired 2–3 times in approximately 5 minutes, depending on the training of the crew, a well trained one being essential to the process of preparing to fire. The British Admiralty did not see fit to provide additional powder to captains to train their crews. Instead of live fire practice, many captains exercised their crews by "running" the guns in and out, performing all the steps associated with firing but without the actual discharge. This lack of gunnery training is attributed as being one of the main reasons the Royal Navy suffered such heavy losses to the United States Navy during the War of 1812. Some wealthy captains, those who had made money capturing prizes or who came from wealthy families, were known to purchase powder with their own funds to enable their crews to fire real discharges at real targets.

== Artillery types ==
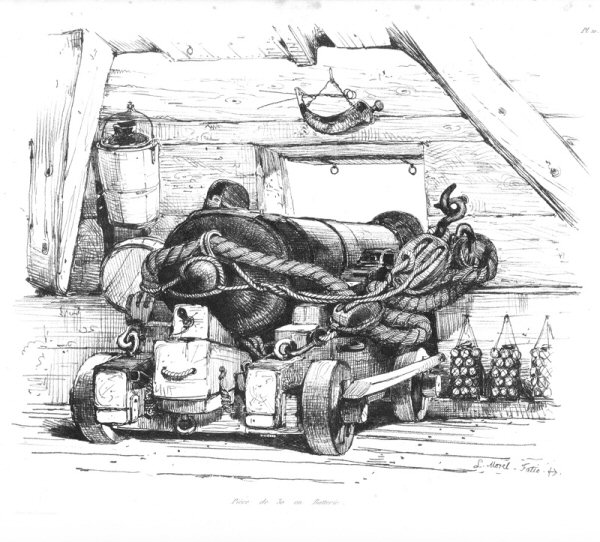
36-pounder long gun at the ready. The pointing system and accessories can be seen clearly

A complete and accurate listing of the types of naval guns requires analysis both by nation and by time period. The types used by different nations at the same time often were very different, even if they were labelled similarly. The types used by a given nation would shift greatly over time, as technology, tactics, and current weapon fashions changed.

Some types include:

- Demi-cannon
- Culverin
- Demi-culverin
- Carronade
- Paixhans gun

In 1712, Colonel Albert Borgard was appointed to the head of the British Royal Ordnance, and introduced a new method of classification by which guns were defined by their pound rating — theoretically, the weight of a single solid iron shot fired by that bore of cannon. The standard sizes were:

- 42-pounders (7 in (180 mm)),
- 36-pounders (6.7 in (170 mm)),
- 32-pounders (6.4 in (160 mm)),
- 24-pounders (5.5 in (140 mm)),
- 18-pounders (5 in (130 mm)),
- 12-pounders (4.7 in (120 mm)),
- 8-pounders (4 in (100 mm)),
- 6-pounders (3.5 in (89 mm)),

and various smaller calibres.

French ships used similarly standardized caliber guns of 36-pound, 24-pounders, 18-pounders, 12-pounders, and 8-pounders, augmented by carronades and smaller pieces. The word pound in this context refers to the French pre-metric unit of weight - the livre, which was 7.916 percent more than the English/British equivalent; thus, as an example, the French "36-pounder" actually equated in British terms to 38lb 13.6oz. A similar qualification must be placed on references to size of guns (i.e. weight of projectile) for every other nation, since each country had its own system of weights and measures. The Spanish "pound", or libra, as another example, equated to 0.4608 kg (1.016 lb) (the British pound equals 0.4536 kg (1.000 lb)); and thus the Spanish 36-libra projectile actually weighed 36lb 9.143oz in British measurements.

In general, larger ships carried more guns and the guns they carried were of a larger calibre.

The muzzle-loading design and weight of the iron placed design constraints on the length and size of naval guns. Muzzle-loading required the cannon to be positioned within the hull of the ship for loading. The hull width, guns lining both sides, and hatchways in the centre of the deck also limited the room available. Weight is always a great concern in ship design as it affects speed, stability, and buoyancy. The desire for longer guns for greater range and accuracy, and greater weight of shot for more destructive power, led to some interesting gun designs.

=== Long nine ===
One of the more unique naval guns, in terms of use, was the long nine, with its use dating back to at least 1660. It was a long-barrelled 9-pound gun (4.2 in (110 mm)) with a barrel length of either 7 (2.13 meters), 8 (2.43 meters), or 9 feet (2.74 meters). The long nine was one of the few types of cannons known to be mounted as a bow or stern chaser where it was not perpendicular to the keel, and this also allowed room to operate this longer weapon. In a chase situation, the gun's greater range came into play. However, the desire to reduce weight in the ends of the ship and the relative fragility of the bow and stern portions of the hull limited this role to a 9-pounder, rather than one which used a 12- or 24-pound shot. The long nine fell out of use in the early 18th century, but saw a resurgence in the second half of the century on small to medium size warships. The long nine was also used as the main battery for certain classes of warship. In 1761, the British Royal Ordnance Board authorized the 7 foot long nine for use as a main battery gun on 24-gun (or fewer) Sixth-rate frigates, and the 9 foot for use on the upper deck batteries of 80-gun Third-rate Ships of the line.

=== Carronade ===
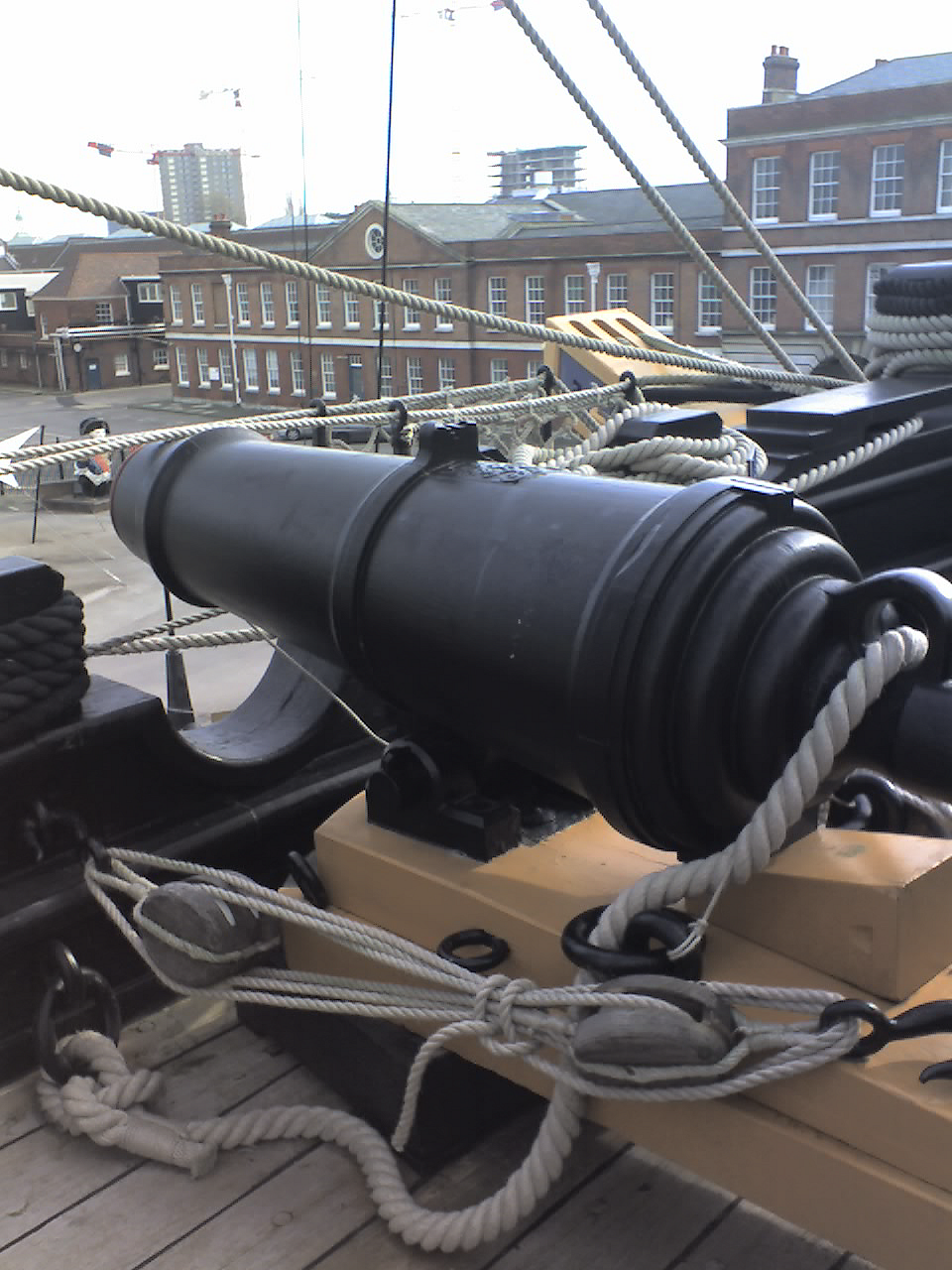
68-pounder British naval carronade mounted on HMS Victory

The carronade was another compromise design. It fired an extremely heavy shot but, to keep down the weight of the gun, it had a very short barrel, giving it shorter range and lesser accuracy. However, at the short range of many naval engagements, these "smashers" were very effective. Their lighter weight and smaller crew requirement allowed them to be used on smaller ships than would otherwise be needed to fire such heavy projectiles. It was used from the mid-18th to the mid-19th century.

=== Paixhans gun ===
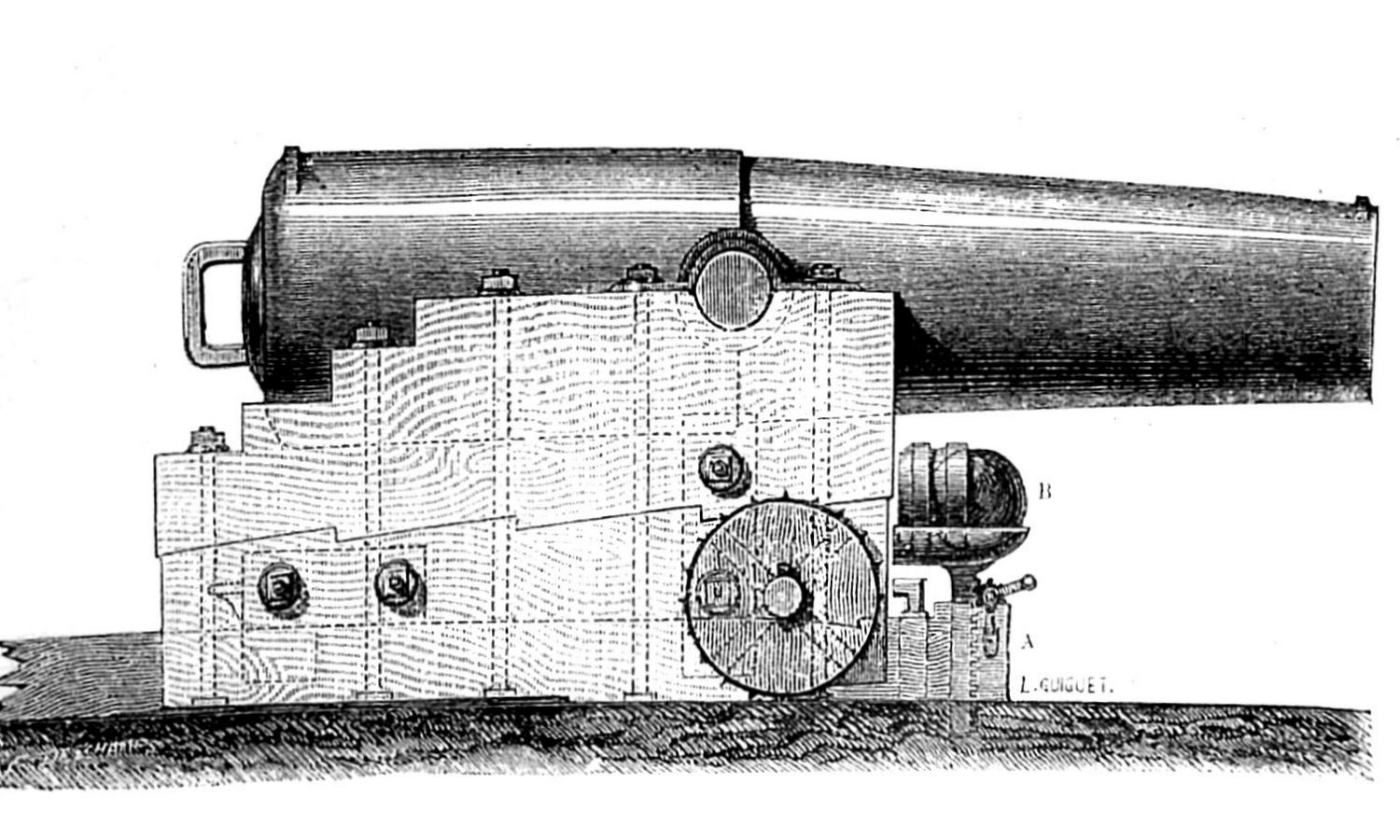
A Paixhans gun.

The Paixhans gun (French: Canon Paixhans) was the first naval gun using explosive shells. It was developed by French general Henri-Joseph Paixhans in 1822–1823 by combining the flat trajectory of a gun with an explosive shell that could rip apart and set on fire the bulkheads of enemy warships. The Paixhans gun ultimately doomed the wooden sail-ship, and forced the introduction of the ironclad after the Battle of Sinop in 1853.

== Shot ==
In addition to varying shot weights and projectiles, different types of shot were employed for various situations:

Round shot
Solid spherical cast-iron shot, the standard fare in naval battles.
Canister shot
Cans filled with dozens of musket balls. The cans broke open on firing to turn the gun into a giant shotgun for use against enemy personnel.
Grapeshot
Canvas-wrapped stacks of smaller round shot which fitted in the barrel, typically three or more layers of three. Some grape shot was made with thin metal or wood disks between the layers, held together by a central bolt. The packages broke open when fired and the balls scattered with deadly effect. Grape was often used against the enemy quarterdeck to kill or injure the officers, or against enemy boarding parties.
Chain-shot
Two iron balls joined together with a chain. This type of shot was particularly effective against rigging, boarding netting, and sails, since the balls and chain would whirl like bolas when fired.
Bar shot
Two balls or hemispheres joined by a solid bar. Their effect was similar to chain shot.
Expanding bar shot
Bar shot connected by a telescoping bar which extended upon firing.
Link shot
A series of long chain links which unfolded and extended upon firing.
Langrage
Bags of any junk (scrap metal, bolts, rocks, gravel, old musket balls, etc.) fired to injure enemy crews.
Fire arrows
A thick dartlike incendiary projectile with a barbed point, wrapped with pitch-soaked canvas which took fire when the gun was fired. The point stuck in sails, hulls, or spars and set fire to the enemy ship.
Heated shot
Shore forts sometimes heated iron shot red-hot in a special furnace before loading it (with water-soaked wads to prevent it from setting off the powder charge prematurely). The hot shot lodging in a ship's dry timbers would set the ship afire. Because of the danger of fire aboard, heated shot were seldom used aboard ships.
Molten iron shell
A variation on heated shot, where molten metal from a furnace is poured into a hollowed out shell and then allowed to cool briefly to seal the molten metal in before firing. HMS Warrior (1860) was outfitted to fire molten shells.
Double shot
Two round shot or other projectiles loaded in one gun and fired at the same time. Double-shotting lowered the effective range and accuracy of the gun, but could be devastating within pistol shot range; that is, when ships drew close enough for a pistol shot to reach between the two ships. To avoid bursting the gun, reduced powder charges were used. Guns sometimes were double-shotted with canister or grape on top of ball, or even triple-shotted with very small powder charges which still were enough to cause horrible wounds at close range.
Exploding shell
Ammunition that worked like a grenade, exploding and sending shrapnel everywhere, either by a burning fuse which was cut to a calculated length depending on the range, or (after 1861) on contact with the target. Shells were often used in mortars, and specialized and reinforced "bomb vessels" (often ketch-rigged so that there was less rigging to obstruct the high-angle mortar shell) were adapted to fire huge mortars for shore bombardment. The "bombs bursting in air" over Fort McHenry in the American national anthem were this type of projectile.

== See also ==
- Age of Sail
- Naval tactics in the Age of Sail
- Howitzer
- Naval artillery
- List of cannon projectiles
