= Falconet (cannon) =

Type of light black-powder cannon

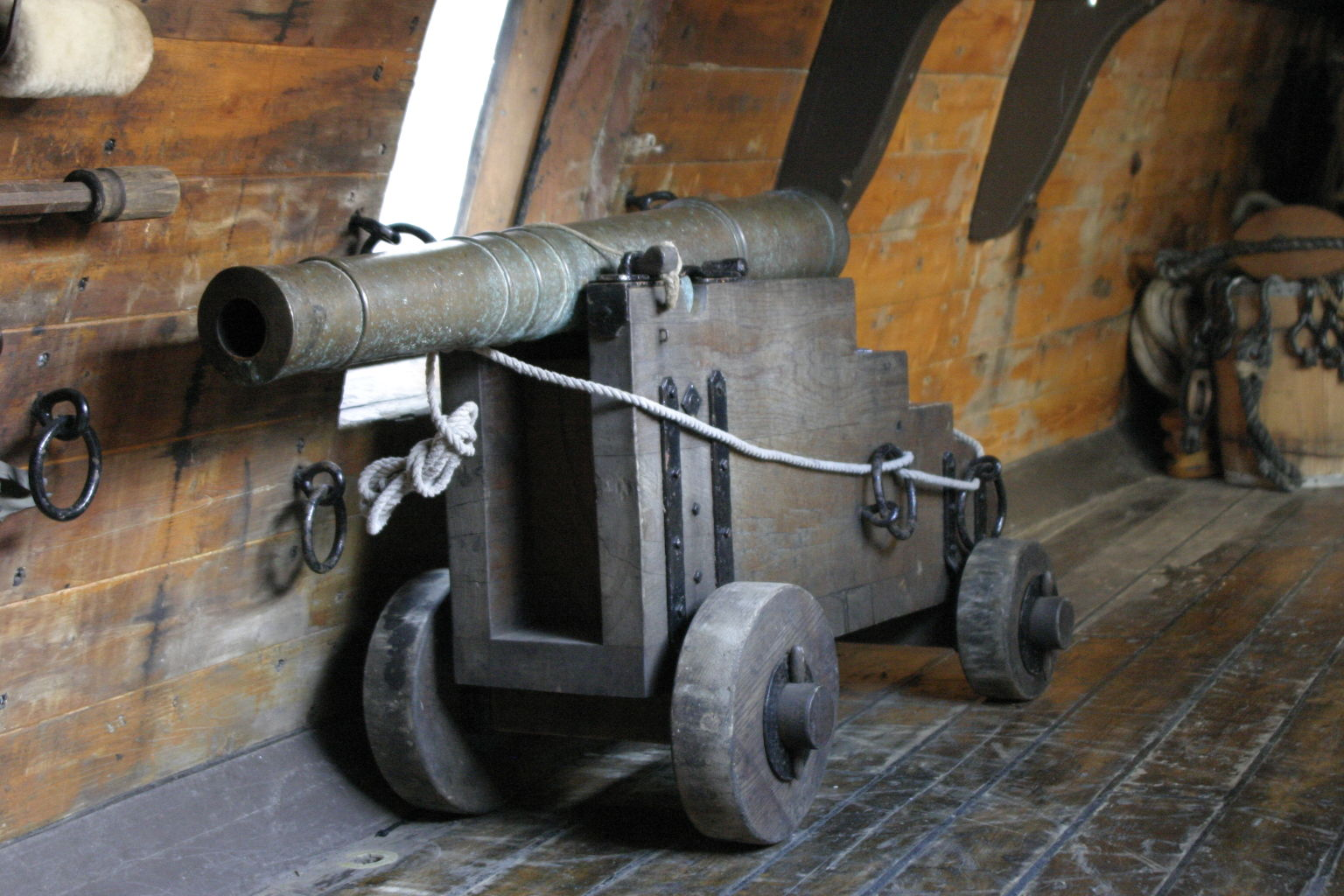
Replica falconet aboard the tall ship Half Moon

The falconet was a light cannon developed in the late 14th century that fired a smaller shot than the similar falcon. During the Middle Ages guns were decorated with engravings of animals, such as reptiles, birds or mythical beasts depending on their size. For example, a culverin would often feature snakes, as the handles on the early cannons were often decorated to resemble serpents. The falconet fired small yet lethal shot of similar weight and size to a bird of prey, and so was decorated with a falcon. Similarly, the musket was associated with the sparrowhawk.

Its barrel was approximately 4 feet (1.2 m) long, had a calibre of 2 inches (5 cm) and weighed 180 to 440 pounds (80 to 200 kg). The falconet used 0.5 pounds (225 g) of black powder to fire a 1 pound (450 g) round shot at a maximum range of approximately 5,000 feet (1,500 m). They could also be used to fire grapeshot.

The falconet resembled an oversized matchlock musket with two wheels attached to improve mobility. In 1620s Germany a breechloading version was invented, seeing action in the Thirty Years War. Many falconets were in use during the English Civil War as they were lighter and cheaper than the culverins, sakers and minions. During times of unrest, they were used by the nobility to defend their grand houses.

Though developed for use on land, the falconet gained naval prominence during the 17th century for the defense of light vessels; for example, on small boats for boarding maneuvers.

== The Castelo de São Jorge ==
The Castelo de São Jorge in Lisbon displays a breech loading Field Falcon dating to the 14th century. The display there states:

This piece is representative of a whole family of pyrobalistic guns (falcons and falconets). They had a small bore, a long barrel, and were very versatile. Falcons and falconets appear in the end of the 14th Century and are built much like a wooden barrel (hence the name "gun barrel") using forged steel blades held together by reinforcing rings. Their versatility is demonstrated by the number of carriages we could find them in:

- Field carriage - this was designed to move swiftly with the rest of the troops providing close fire support.
- Siege carriage - designed to keep the falcon as still as possible in order to repeatedly hit the same spot on the wall to bring it down.
- Naval carriage - when on board a ship it was often mounted on a sort of "crib" (and thus sometimes called a "berco" - Portuguese for crib), used mainly for close quarters fire support in boarding actions.

Also of note is the fact that this is a breech loading gun and not a muzzle loading one. Breech loading comes to being very early in cannon development; it had a number of advantages such as fast fire rate, easier loading operation etc. However mechanical and metallurgical technology were not sufficiently developed so these guns suffered from poor joints between the movable chamber and the barrel, and a part of the deflagration gasses vented from the joint reducing power and range. By late 15th Century breech loading started to fall into disuse due to new smelting technologies that allowed better muzzle loading guns.

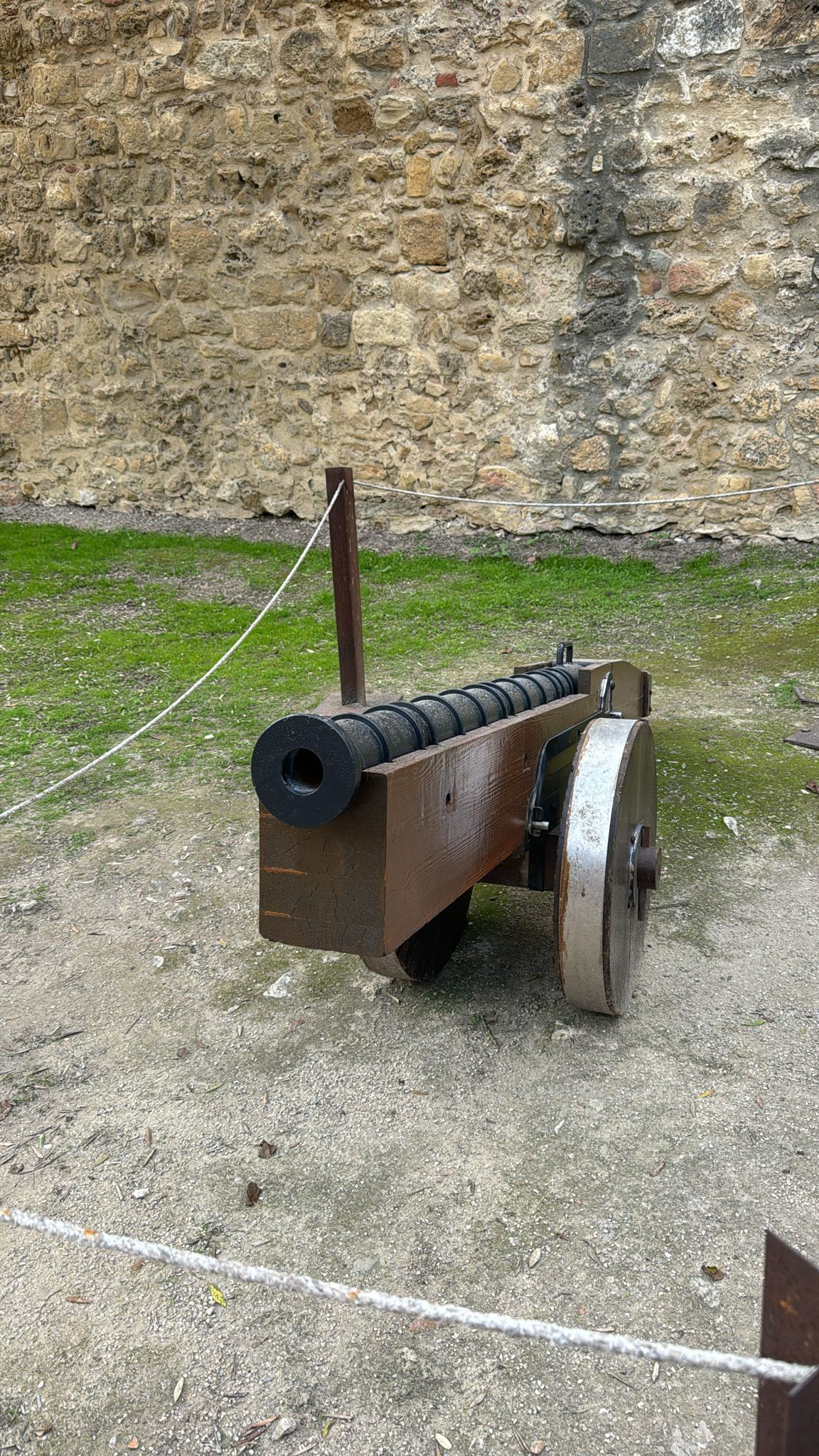
Field Falcon displayed at Castelo de São Jorge

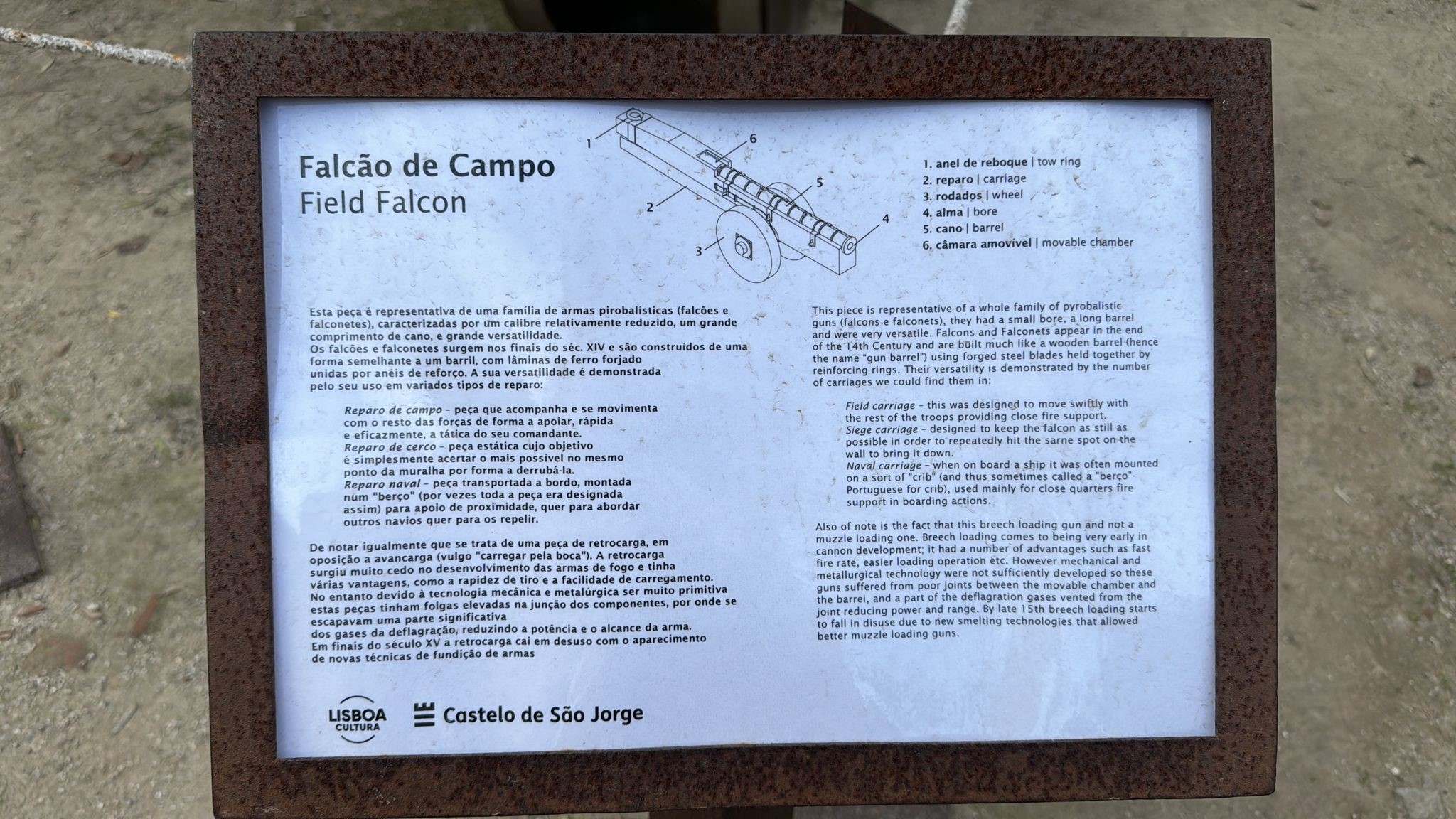
Description of Field Falcon displayed at Castelo de São Jorge.

== Gallery ==
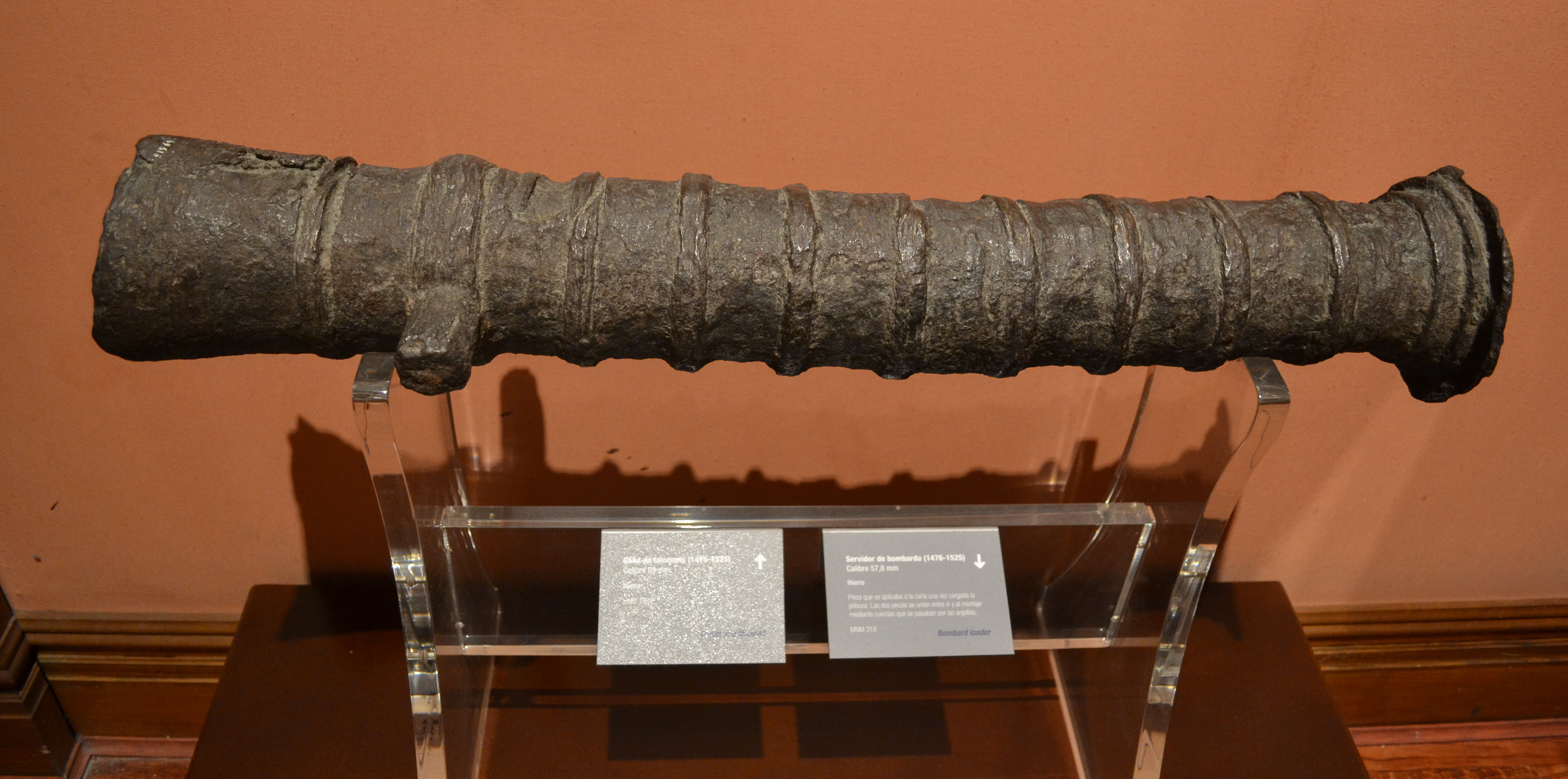
A barrel of a swivel gun falconete (c. 1476–1525). Material: Iron. Caliber: 65 mm.

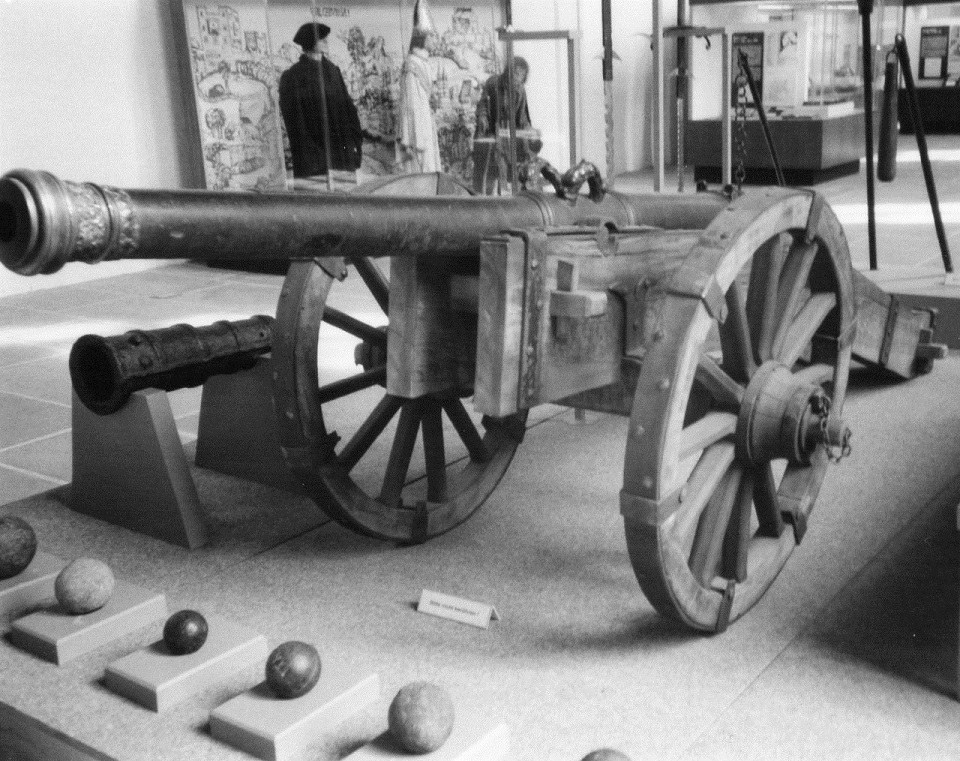
Falconet in the Peasants War Museum Muehlhausen.

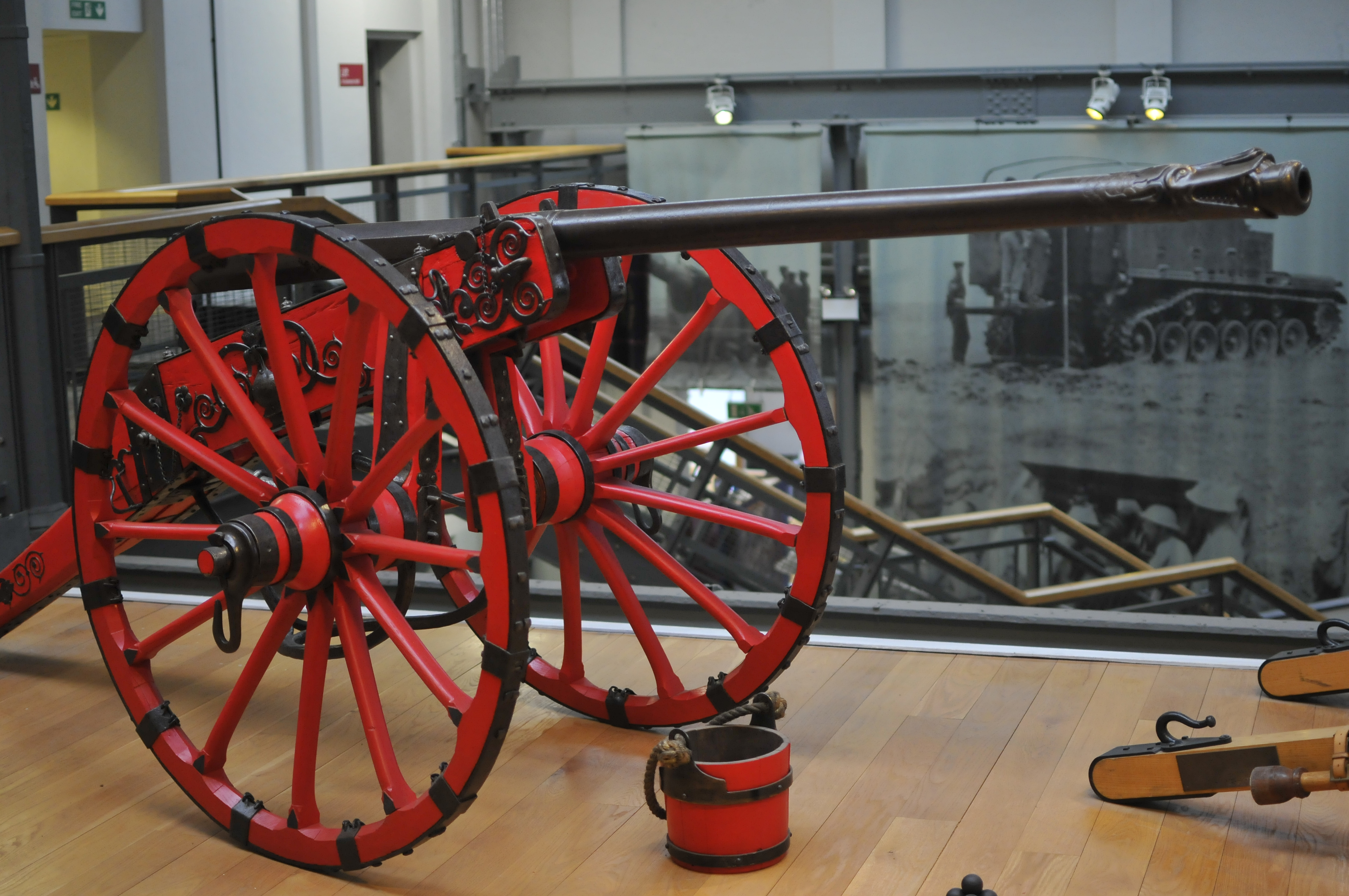
Wrought iron falconet, 17th century.

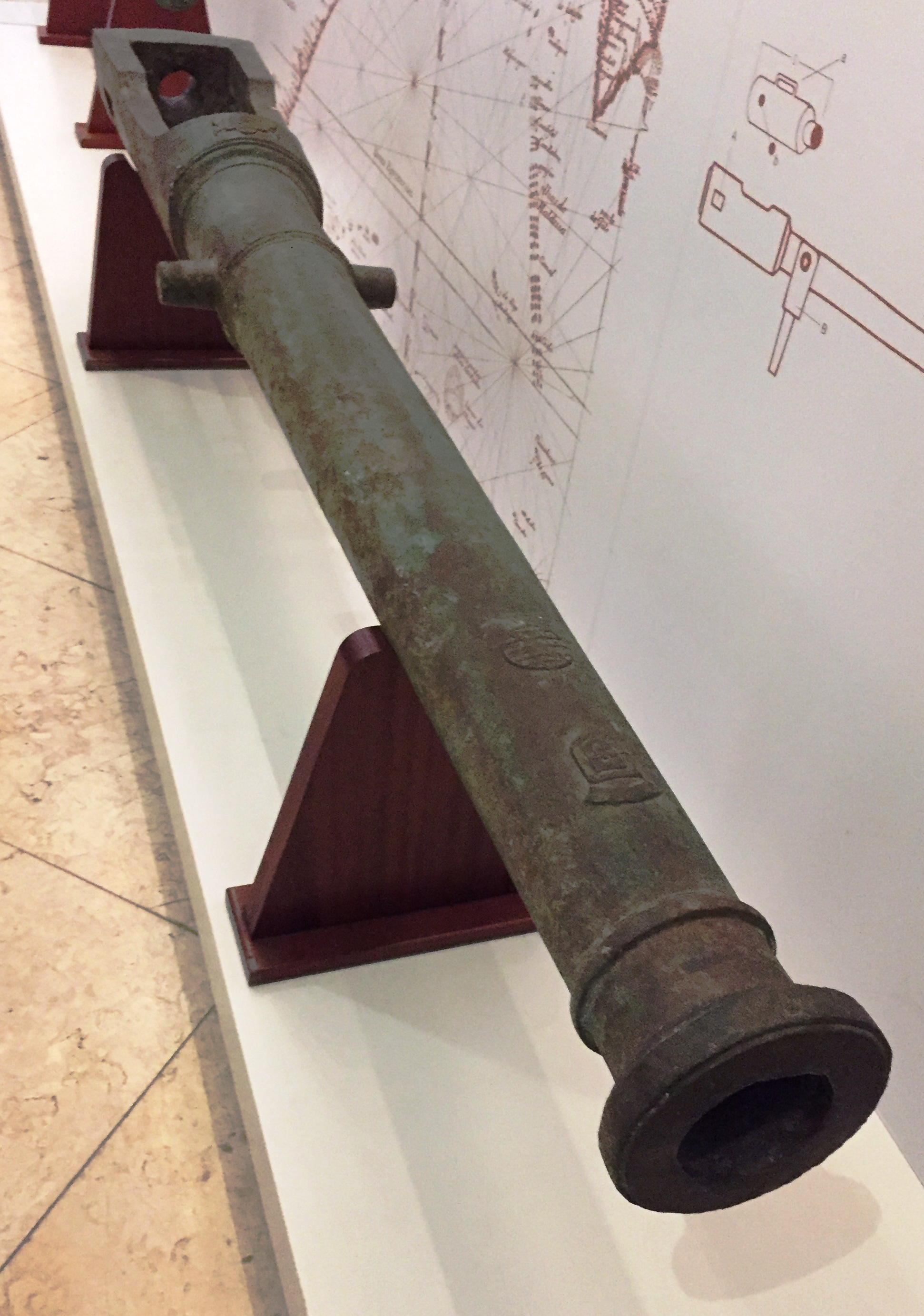
Breech-loading falconet in the Navy Museum of Lisbon, Portugal. Bronze. Reign of Sebastian I (1557–1578). Found in 1985 in the shipwreck of Portuguese carrack Santiago on the shallows of Judia, Indian Ocean.

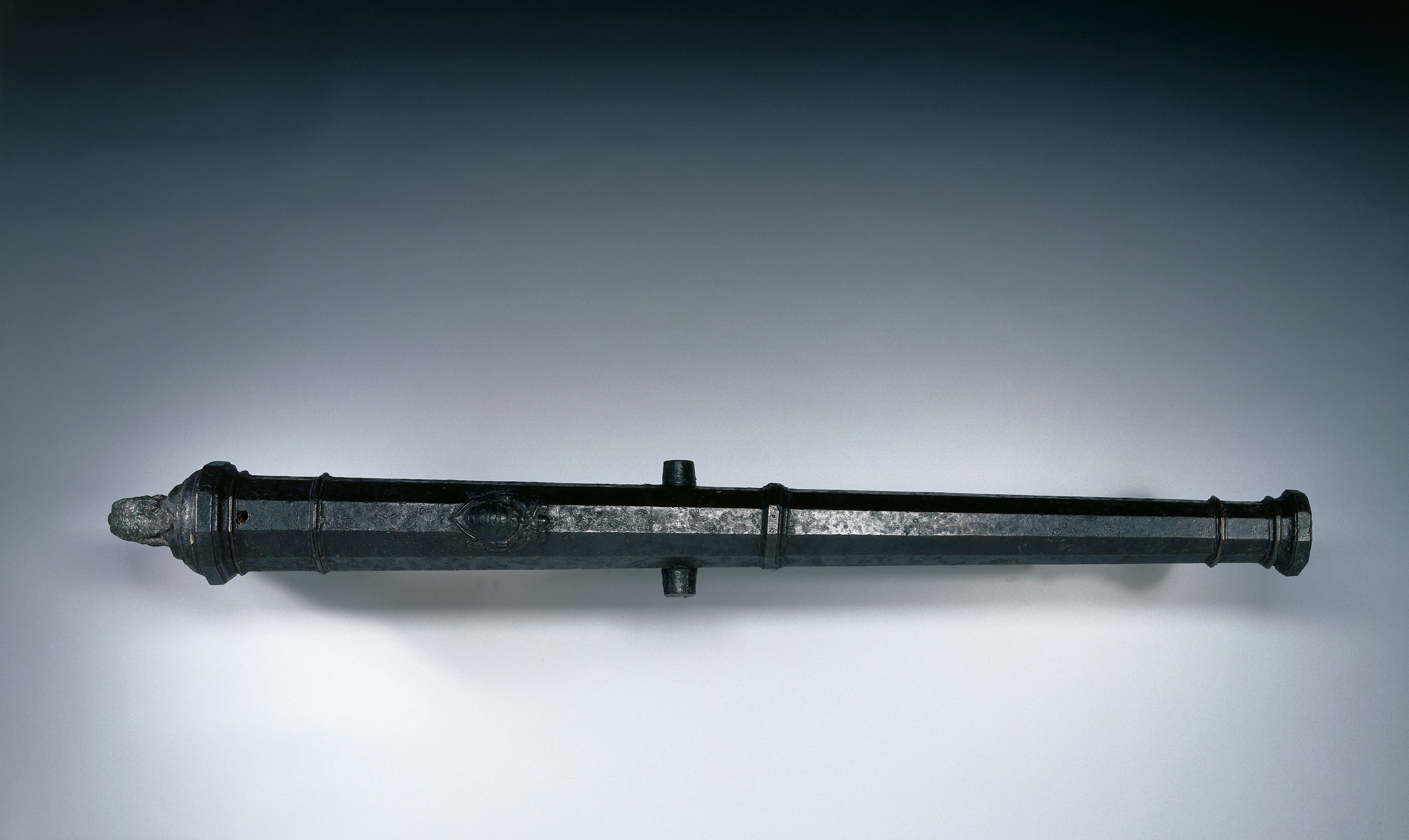
Bronze falconet. Diameter: 11.2 cm (4 7/16 in.); Overall: 162.2 cm (63 7/8 in.); Bore: 4.7 cm (1 7/8 in.).

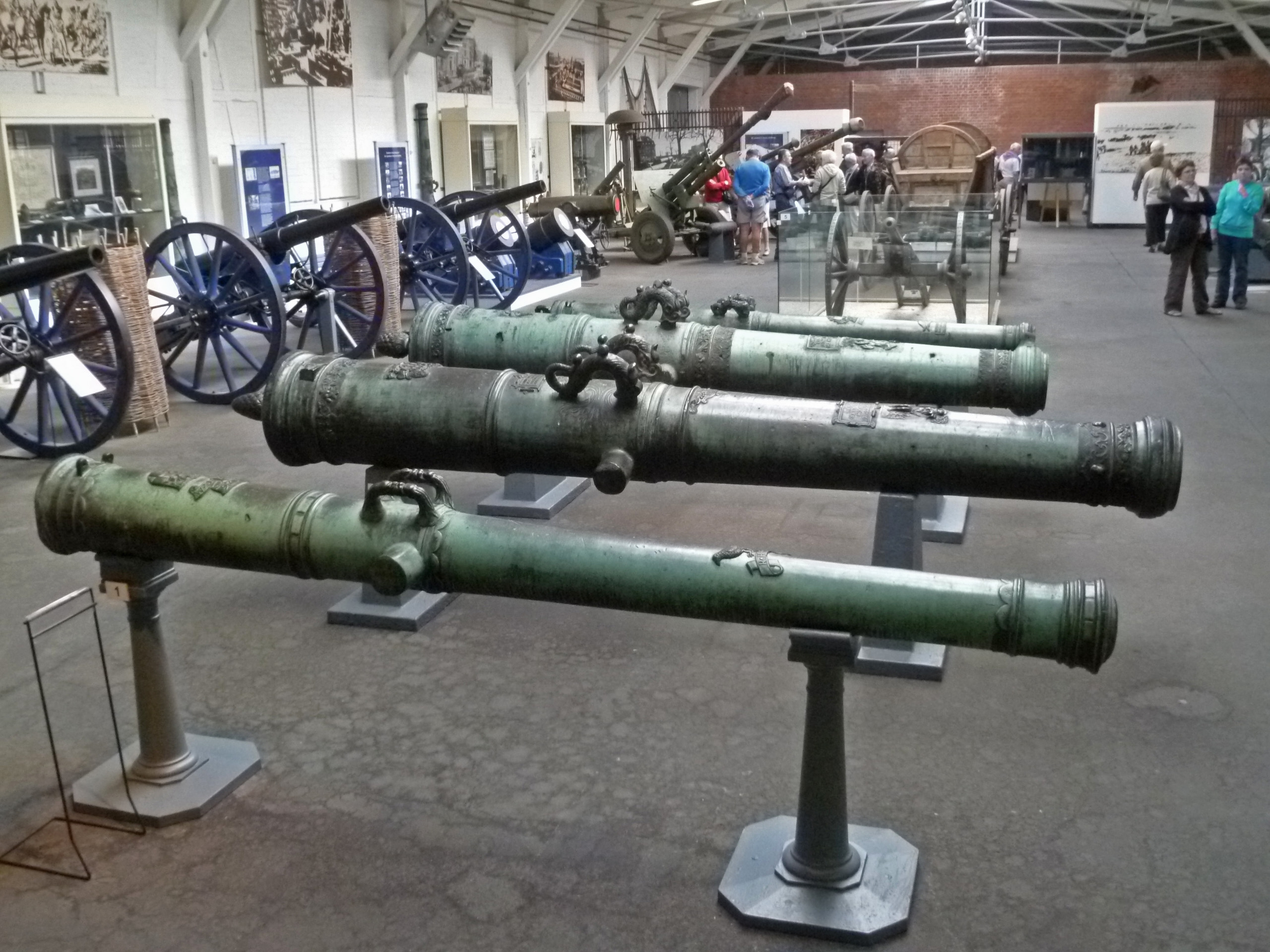
Falconet (1526); kartouwe (1617); kartouwe (1635); culverin (1681); rifle-barrelled cannon (1730); exhibition in the Spandau Citadel.

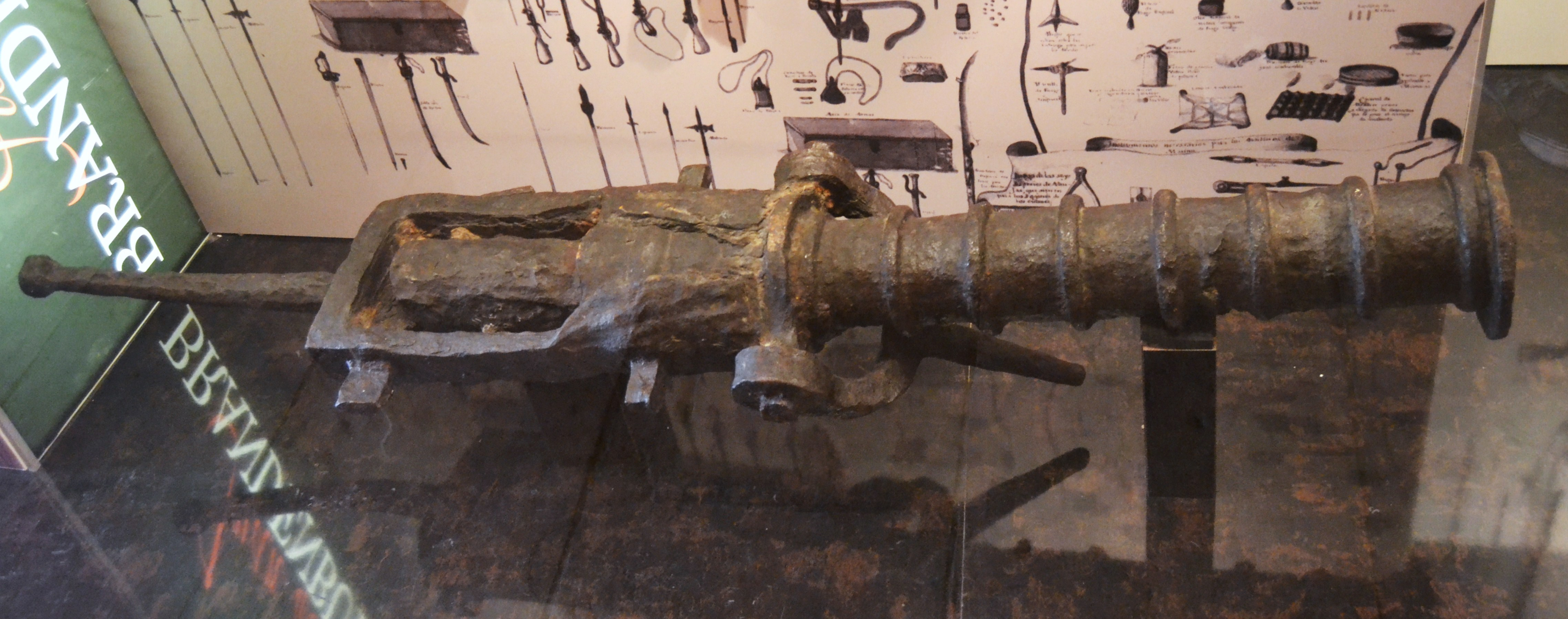
Breech-loading wrought iron falconet, 15th-16th century A.D.

== See also ==
- Lela, Southeast Asian equivalent of falconet
- Culverin
- History of gunpowder
