= Heated shot =

Ancient artillery technique

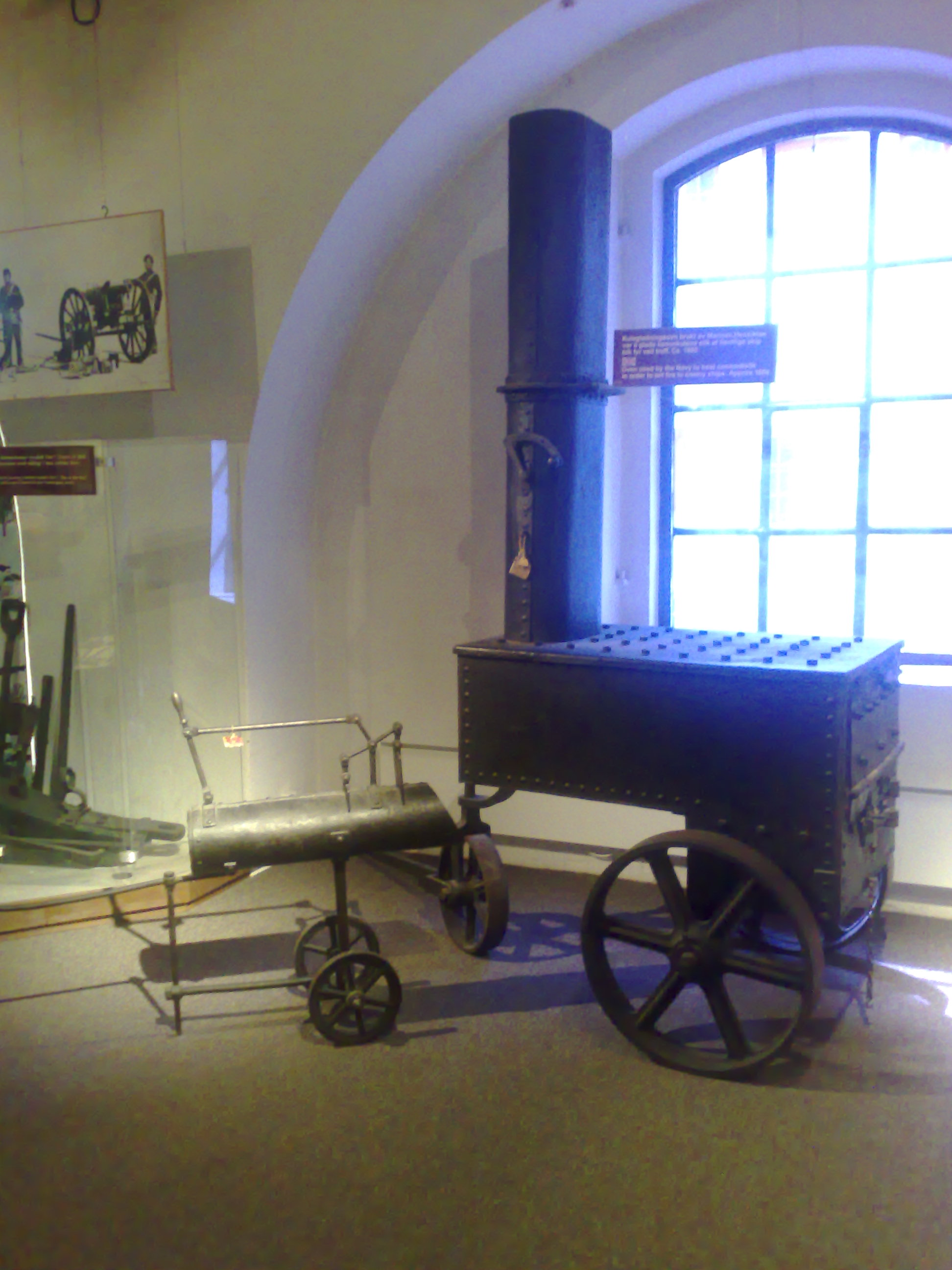
Mobile furnace, operated by the Royal Norwegian Navy, used to heat cannon shots (ca. 1860).

Heated shot or hot shot is round shot that is heated before firing from muzzle-loading cannons, for the purpose of setting fire to enemy warships, buildings, or equipment. The use of heated shot dates back centuries. It was a powerful weapon against wooden warships, where fire was always a hazard. It was rendered obsolete in the mid-19th century when vessels armored with iron replaced wooden warships in the world's navies. Also at around the same time, the replacement of solid-iron shot with exploding shells gave artillery a far more destructive projectile that could be fired immediately without preparation.

The use of heated shot was mainly confined to shore batteries and forts, due to the need for a special furnace to heat the shot, and their use from a ship was in fact against Royal Navy regulations because they were so dangerous, although the American ship USS Constitution had a shot furnace installed for hot shot to be fired from her carronades. The French Romaine-class frigates originally also featured the device, but they proved impractical, dangerous to the ships themselves, and were later discarded.

== History ==
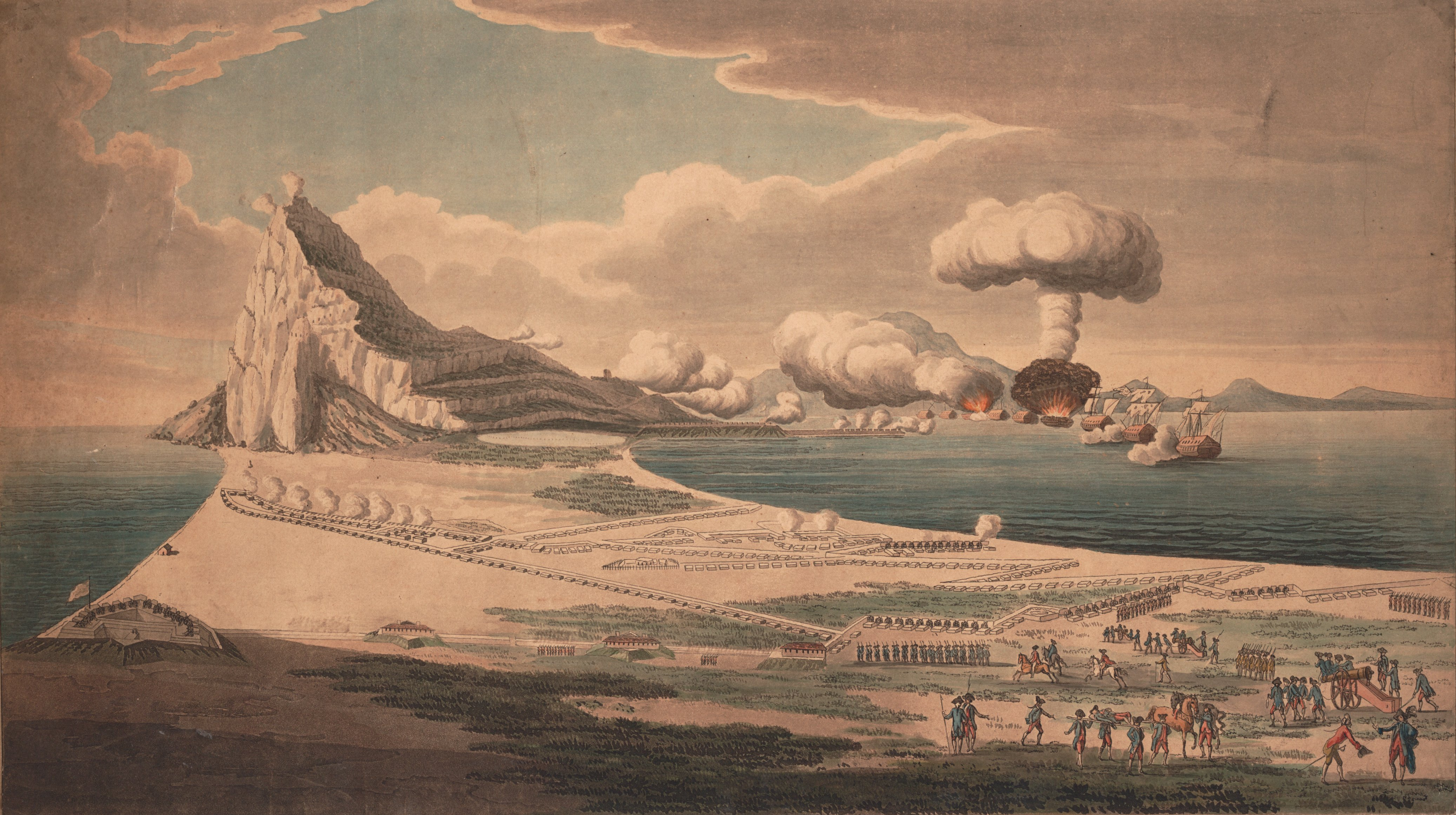
A contemporary aquatint of the 1782 Franco-Spanish attack on Gibraltar. A Spanish floating battery is shown exploding after the British defenders set it on fire with heated shot

The idea of setting fire to enemy warships can be traced back to the ancient world, where fire arrows and incendiary materials such as Greek fire were used. In 54 BC, heated clay balls were used by the Britons to attack Roman encampments, while in medieval siege warfare, catapults were used to hurl fire balls and other incendiaries into besieged castles and settlements.

- The first successful use of heated shot fired from cannon was by King Stephen Bathory of Poland in 1579 against the Russians at Polotsk. From that time on the use of heated projectiles became increasingly important, especially against wooden warships of the period.
- During the American Revolutionary War, French artillerymen destroyed the British frigate HMS Charon using heated shot during the Battle of Yorktown in 1781.
- In 1782, during the Great Siege of Gibraltar, French and Spanish forces attempted to use large floating batteries to bombard the British defenders. The batteries were of extremely heavy construction and were considered to be invincible. British artillery in Gibraltar used heated shot to destroy three of the ten batteries, inflicting a loss of 719 crewmen. The remaining seven were scuttled by the Spanish due to heavy damage.
- In 1792, Austrian forces besieging Lille used heated shot against the city, which was described as a war crime by the French Republican press.
- In July 1801, during the Second Battle of Algeciras, two Spanish ships of the line exploded killing nearly 1,700 members of their crews. According to various sources, the fire that caused the explosions of both ships originated from heated shots fired by HMS Superb.
- In 1817, the Negro Fort, a fort inhabited by fugitive slaves escaping slavery in the United States was obliterated when a heated shot (heated in a boat galley) fired by an American gunboat landed in the Fort's powder magazine. The resulting explosion killed about 270 and wounded 30 others.
- One of the last significant uses of heated shot in naval warfare occurred in 1862, at the Battle of Hampton Roads, when the CSS Virginia used heated shot to great effect against USS Congress, setting her on fire.

== Operation ==
=== Hot-shot furnaces ===
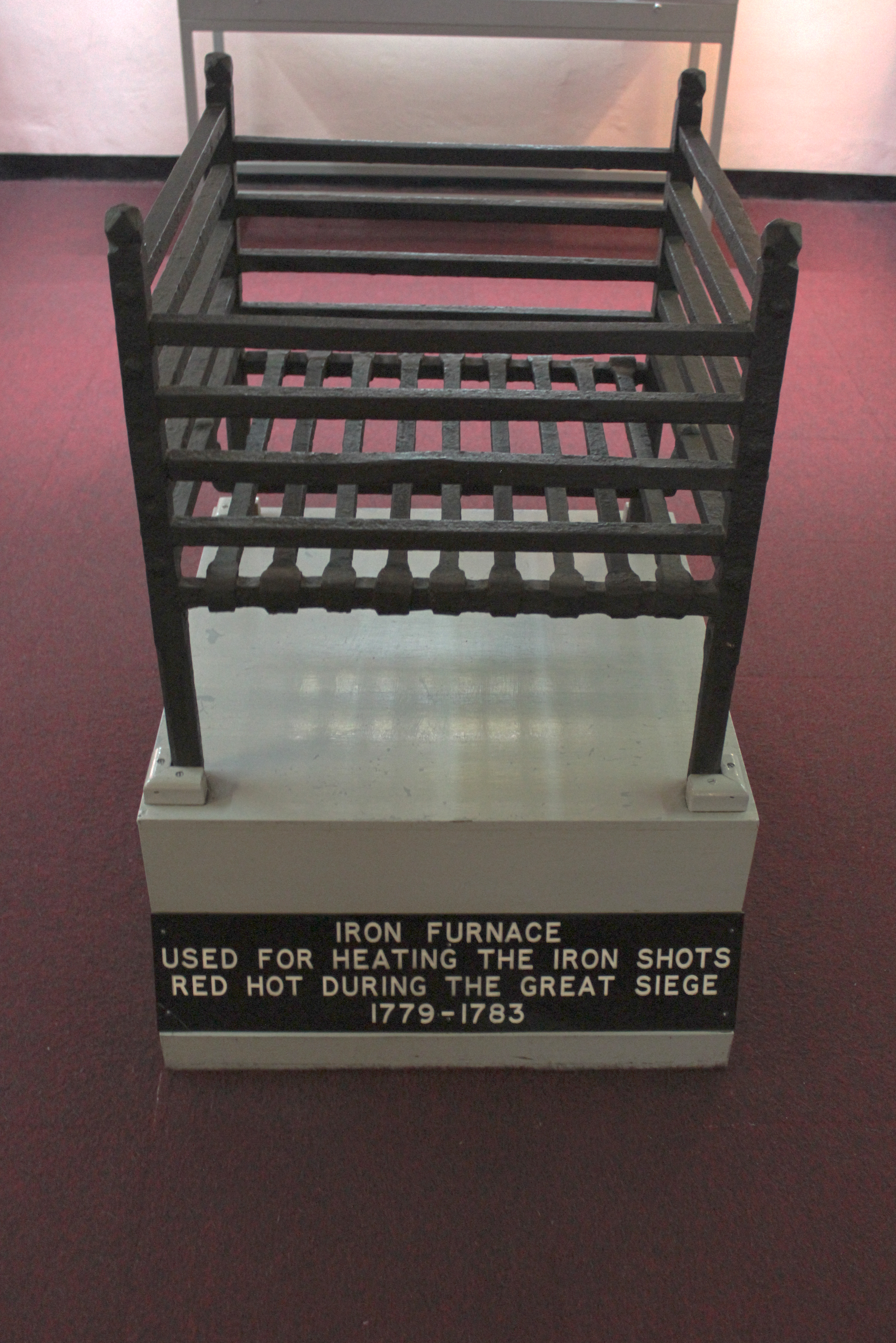
An iron grate for heating iron shot during the Great Siege of Gibraltar (1779–83)

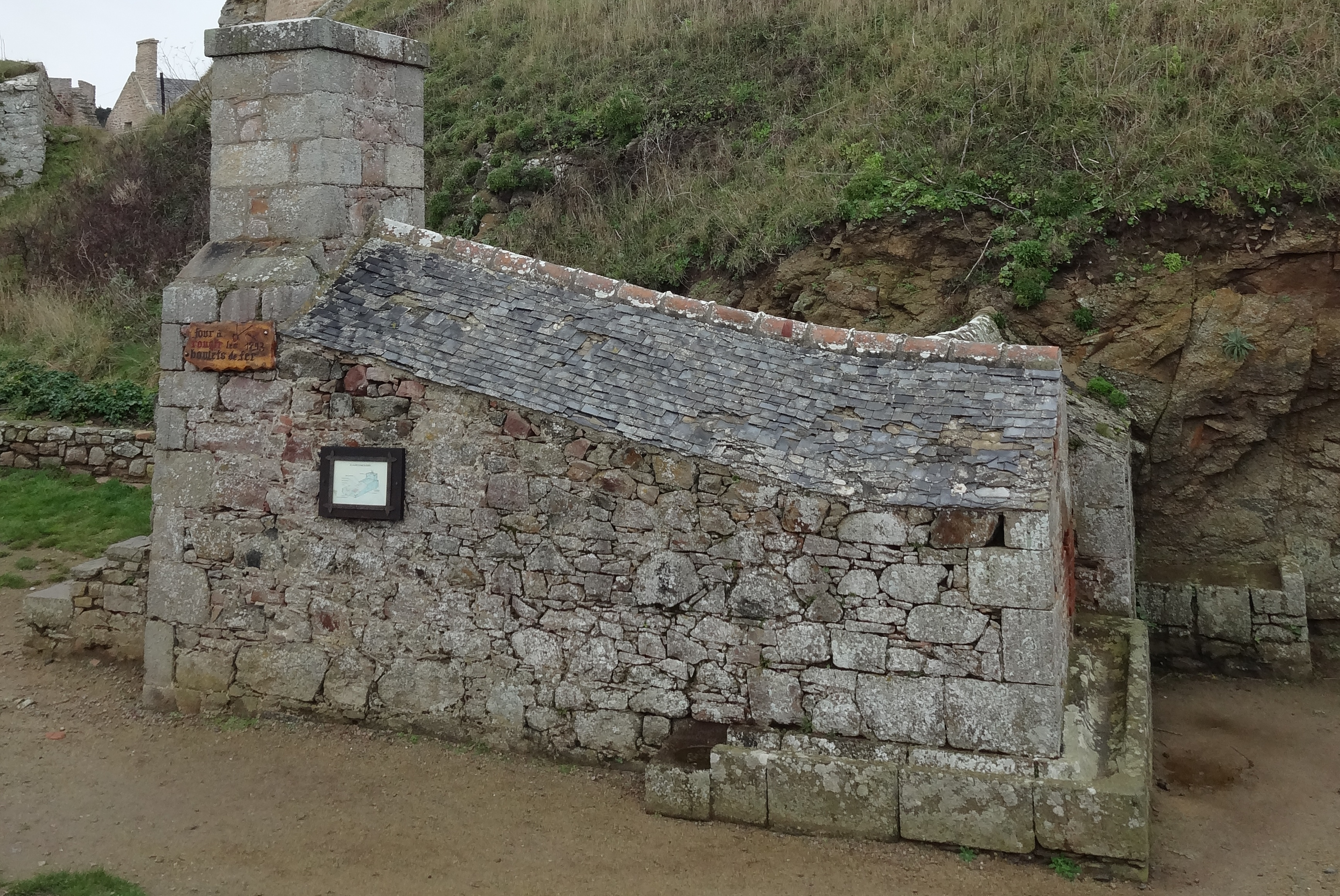
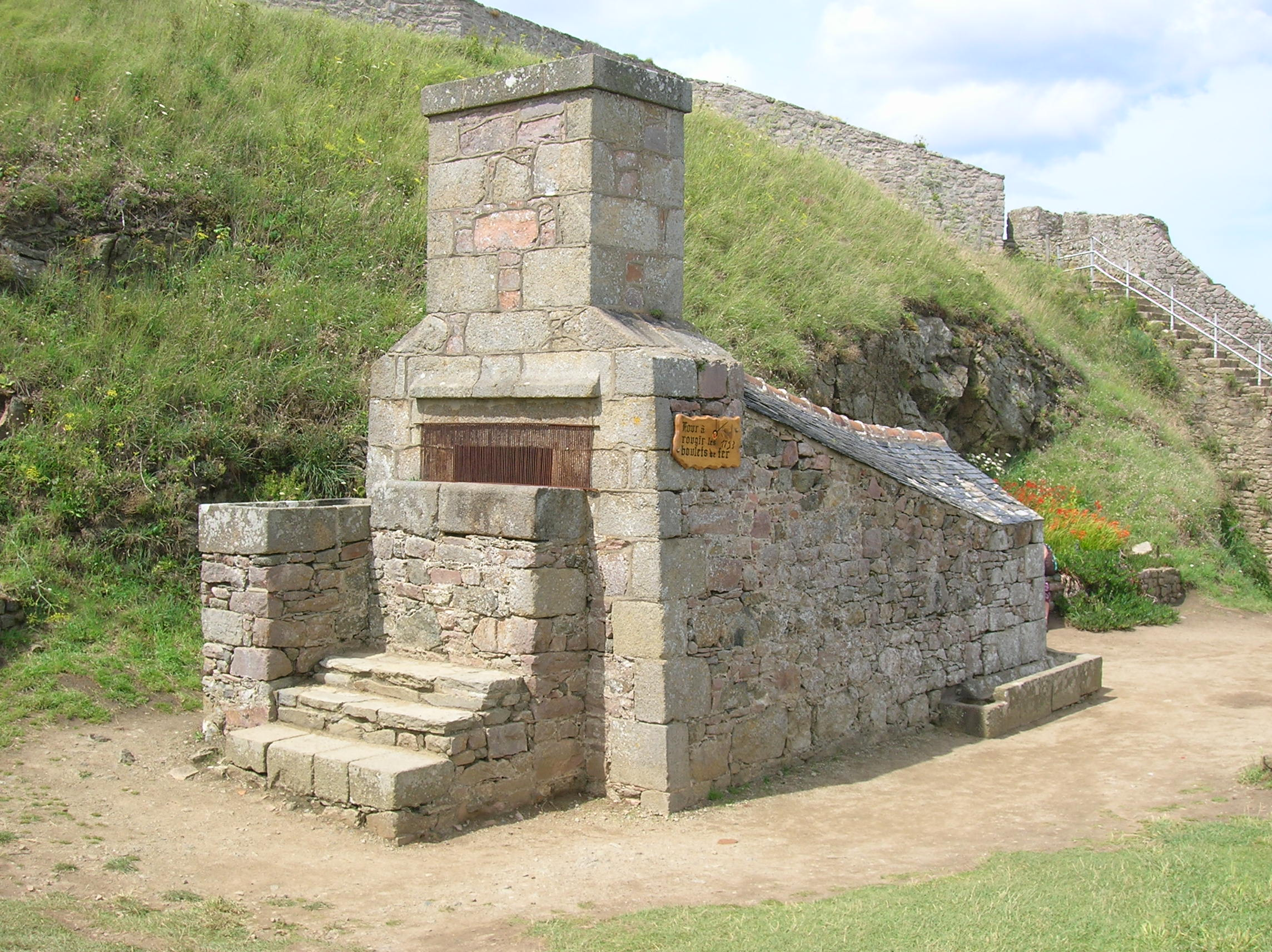
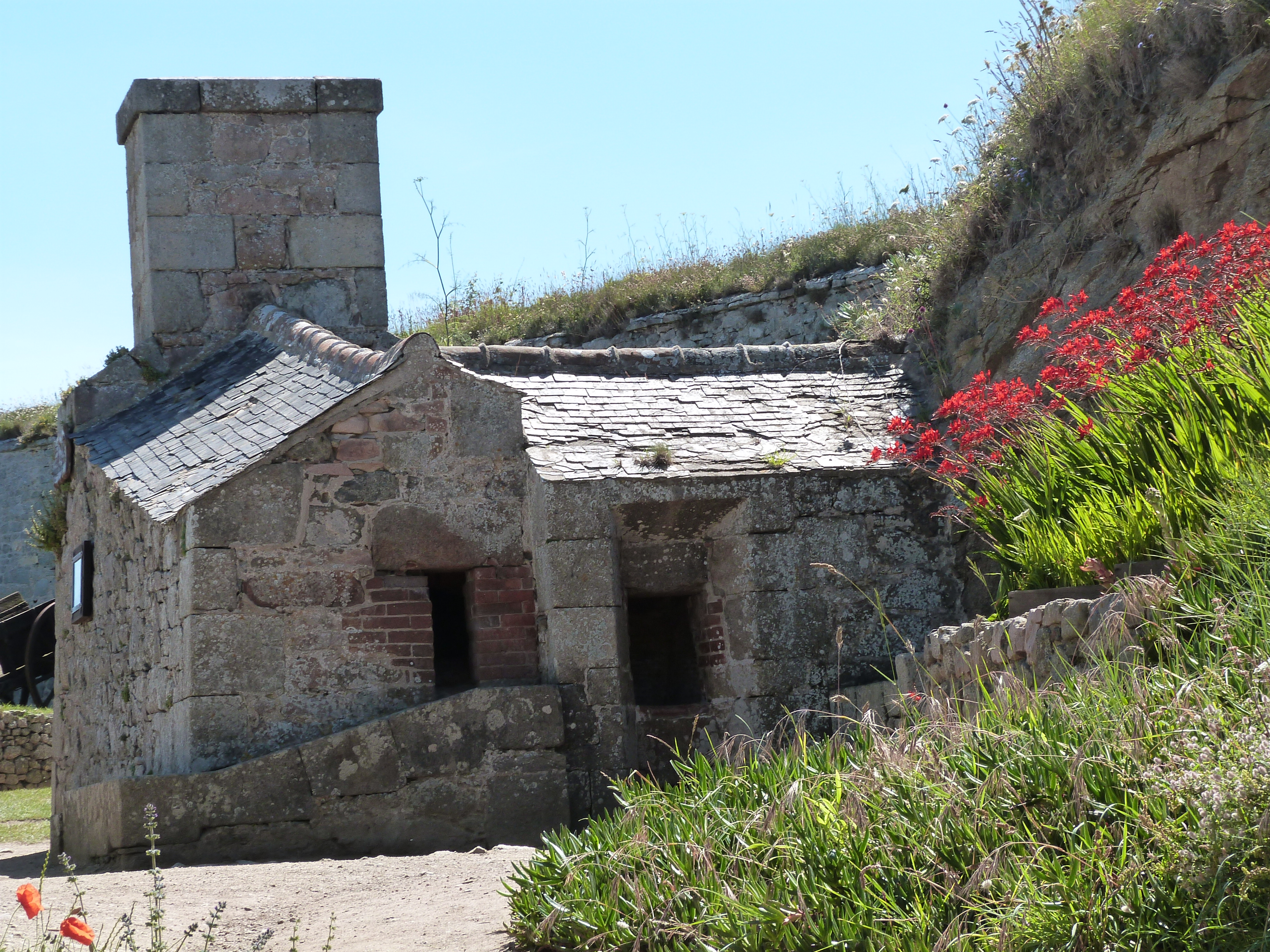
The heated-shot furnace built in 1793 at Fort-la-Latte, France

The original method of heating round shot was to cover them in the coals of a large wood fire, or heat them on metal grates placed over a fire pit. These time-consuming methods were improved by the French, who used specially-constructed furnaces to heat shot in their artillery batteries at the mouth of the Rhône River in 1794, although artillery units would continue to use a grate constructed of iron bars and earth when a purpose-built shot furnace was unavailable.

The United States incorporated hot-shot furnaces into the design of coastal fortifications during the construction of the Second System of seacoast defenses, just prior to the War of 1812. Colonel Jonathan Williams left his post as Commandant at the US Military Academy to build hot-shot furnace fortifications such as Castle Clinton and Castle Williams in New York Harbor during this period. When French engineer General Simon Bernard came to the US in 1816 to head the Board of Fortifications, for the construction of permanent forts to defend the US coastline, he introduced the idea of hot-shot furnaces of the French pattern. The chain of US coastal forts built between 1817 and the American Civil War, such as Fort Macon, subsequently had one or more hot-shot furnaces included as part of their standard defences.

A hot-shot furnace was typically a free-standing brick or stone structure with special iron racks and grates, varying in size according to the number of round shot they were to heat and the number of cannon they served – a large furnace might hold 60 or more round shot. They were commonly six to eight feet (1.8 to 2.4 m) wide, and anything from 8 to 30 feet (2.4 to 9.1 m) in length. A chimney was situated at one end with a firebox located in the front or side of the opposite end. The interior of the furnace was lined with fire brick and had sloping iron rails sized to hold round shot.

Cold round shot were placed in the furnace and allowed to roll down the inclined rails in rows. The first shot halted over the firebox at the low end and were heated "cherry red", approximately between 800 and 900 °C (1,470 and 1,650 °F). When they were removed, the next shot rolled down to take its place. Care had to be taken not to overheat the shot, as any that were hotter than "cherry red" were likely to become misshapen, and jam in the bore of the gun. A hot furnace could heat a 24 pounder shot in around 25 minutes, with larger shot taking a few minutes longer. If the furnace was cold, heating shot could take up an hour and a quarter after lighting the fire.

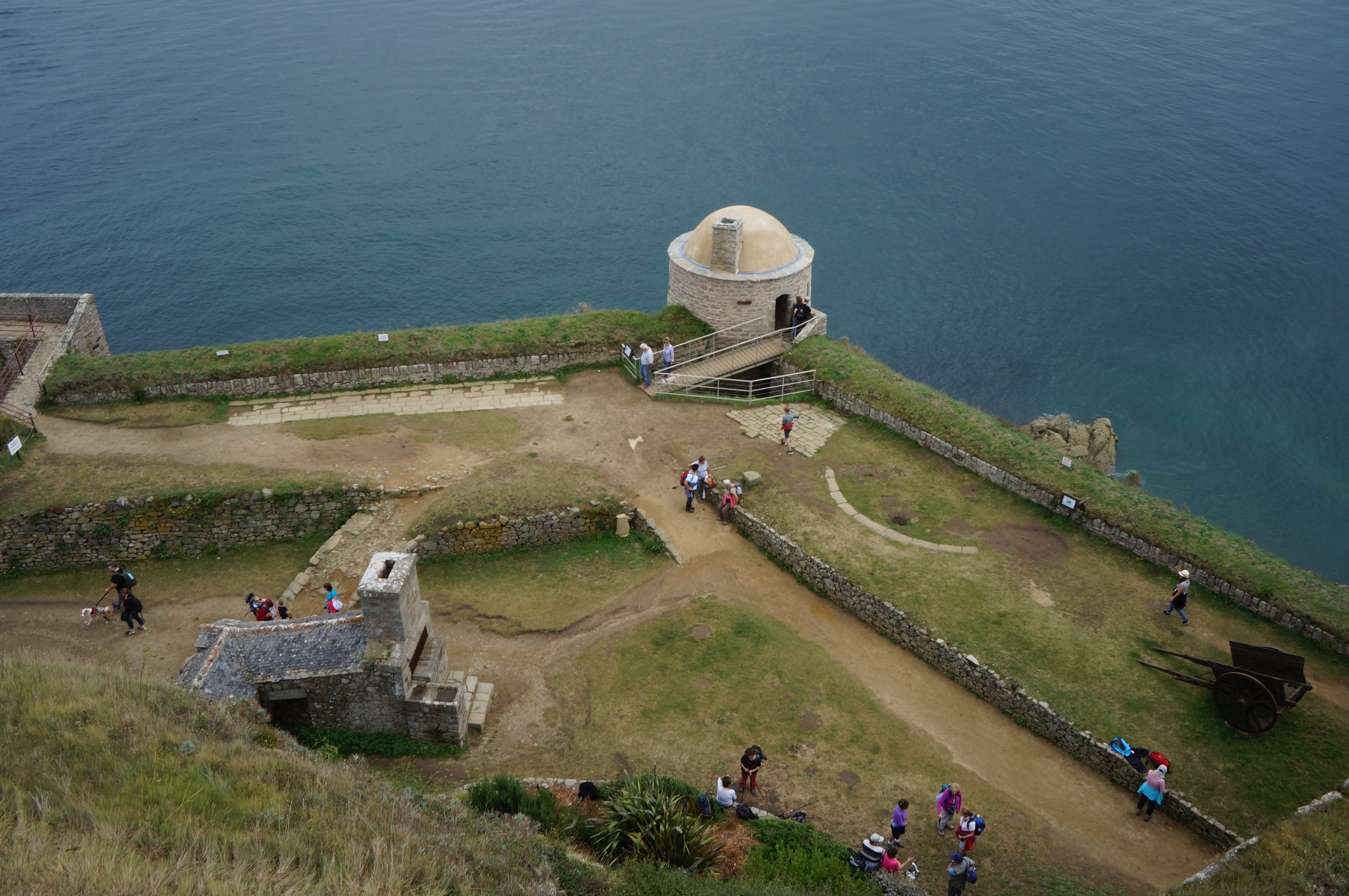
The heated-shot furnace at Fort-la-Latte, showing its proximity to the ramparts where the fort's guns were placed

Three men were required to manage a furnace. One maintained the fire and added cold shot, a second man removed heated shot from the furnace, and the third man cleaned them. Special tools were required to handle heated shot. An iron fork was used to remove heated shot from the furnace, then the shot was placed on a stand and cleaned by rubbing off loose surface scale with a rasp. A pair of tongs with circular jaws was used to handle the shot at the furnace. To carry the shot to the cannons, hot-shot ladles were used. The ladles had an iron cup for the shot with one or three handles. Round shot less than 24 lb (11 kg) weight size could be carried by one man with a single-handle ladle, while larger shot needed a three-handle ladle, carried between two men like a stretcher.

=== Loading ===
Great care had to be taken loading heated shot into a cannon to ensure that the red-hot shot did not prematurely ignite the cannon's charge of gunpowder.

A cartridge bag of gunpowder was loaded first. A double bag was used with heated shot to prevent leakage of grains of gunpowder as the bag was rammed down the cannon. Once the bag was in place, a dry wad of hay or cloth was rammed down against the bag, followed by a wad of wet hay, clay or fuller's earth. These would shield the charge from the heated shot, which was loaded next.

If the cannon was to be fired at a downward angle, another wet wad was rammed against the ball to prevent it from rolling out. If proper loading precautions were taken, the wet wad could protect the gunpowder cartridge from premature ignition even until the heated shot had cooled down. However it was better to fire the gun quickly as water boiled from the wet wad could condense in the gunpowder charge if there was an excessive delay.

A common practice with heated shot was to fire it with a reduced charge of gunpowder - as little as a quarter or a sixth the charge used for shooting a cold shot over the same distance. This would cause the shot to lodge in the wood of the target ship rather than penetrating it, and also cause greater splitting and splintering of the wood. Also, if a shot embedded itself too deeply into the target, insufficient air would reach it to effectively start a fire before it cooled down.

In 1862, a cage-like, iron base for heated shot was patented in the US by Charles T. James, that enabling heated shot to be fired from rifled artillery. At least one of these has been found at Fort Pillow, Tennessee, the site of the 1864 Battle of Fort Pillow during the American Civil War.

== Molten iron shells ==
In 1860, the Martin molten iron shell was introduced to Royal Navy service. These shells were filled with iron melted in a cupola furnace and were intended to break up on impact, splashing molten iron on the target and setting fire to any combustible material present. The shells were named after their designer, an employee of the Royal Laboratory at the Royal Arsenal. The interior was lined with a mixture of horsehair and loam for insulation.

The furnace installation, known as Anderson's Cupola. burned coke and used a steam-powered fan to produce a forced draught. From the time of lighting, around an hour was required to bring seven hundredweight (320 kg) of pig iron to its melting point of 1,150 to 1,200 °C (2,100 to 2,190 °F) – this amount could fill 30 8-inch shells. After filling, the shells were left for a few minutes before firing, which allowed the metal in the filling hole to solidify and seal the hole. The shells remained effective even if an hour elapsed between filling and firing as, by this time, the filling would have solidified and the shell casing heated, making them equivalent to conventional heated shot. This included shells that had failed to break up on impact and had remained embedded in the timbers of the target.

Various sizes of shells were tested, but it was found that only the largest shells had a useful incendiary effect. Experiments were carried out in 1859 using the aged, redundant frigate HMS Undaunted as a target. The first three shells were ineffectual, but after the fourth and fifth had been fired, a fire had been started on Undaunted's lower deck that could not be put out with her fire fighting equipment. The ship was finally sunk with conventional shells.

Molten-iron shells were easier to handle and somewhat more effective than the red-hot shot they replaced. A cupola furnace for melting iron was installed on HMS Warrior. The system was declared obsolete in 1869.

== Gallery ==
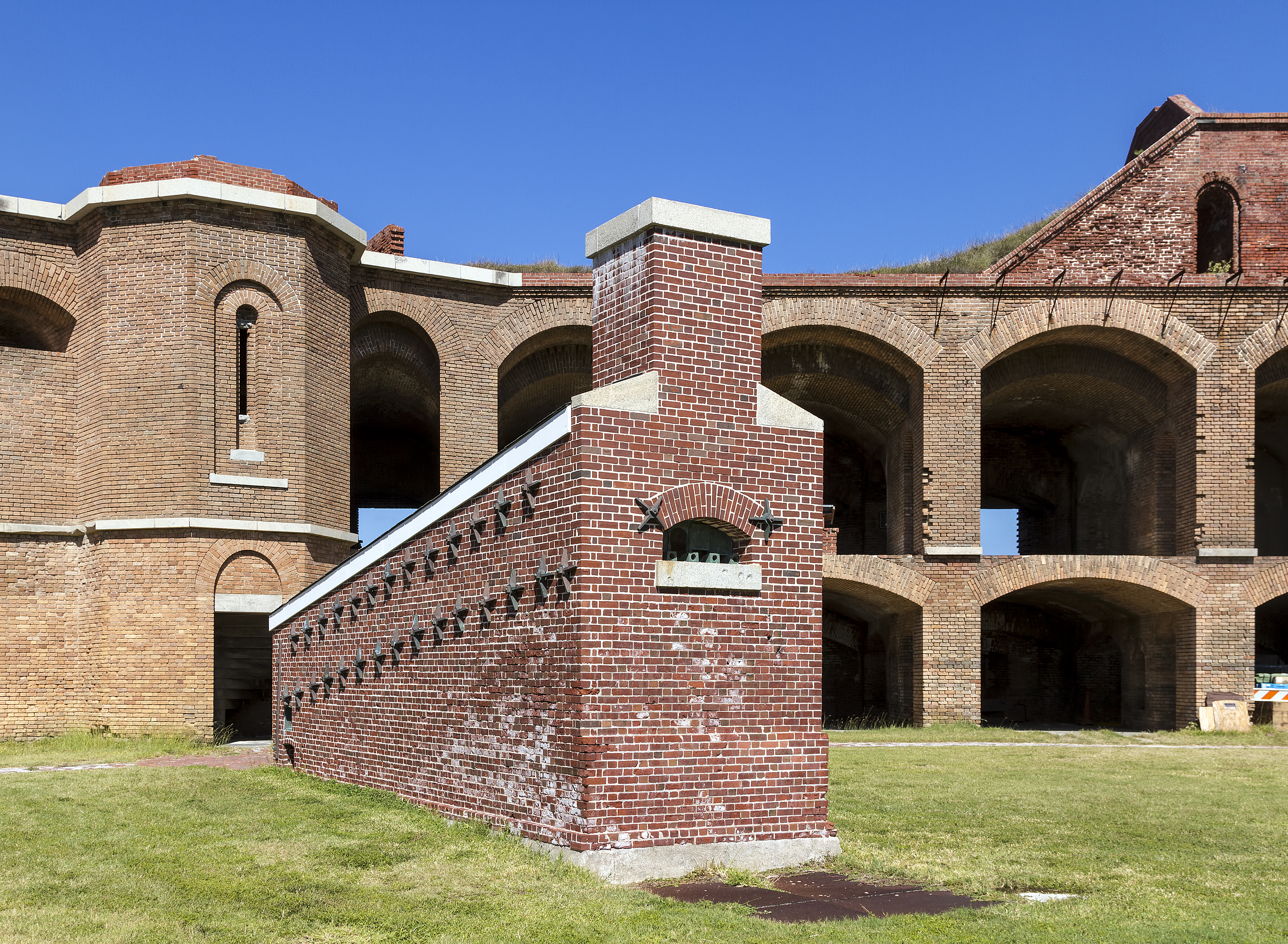
Fort Jefferson, Florida, USA

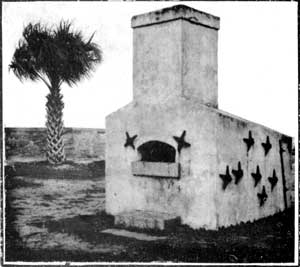
Fort Marion, Florida, U.S.

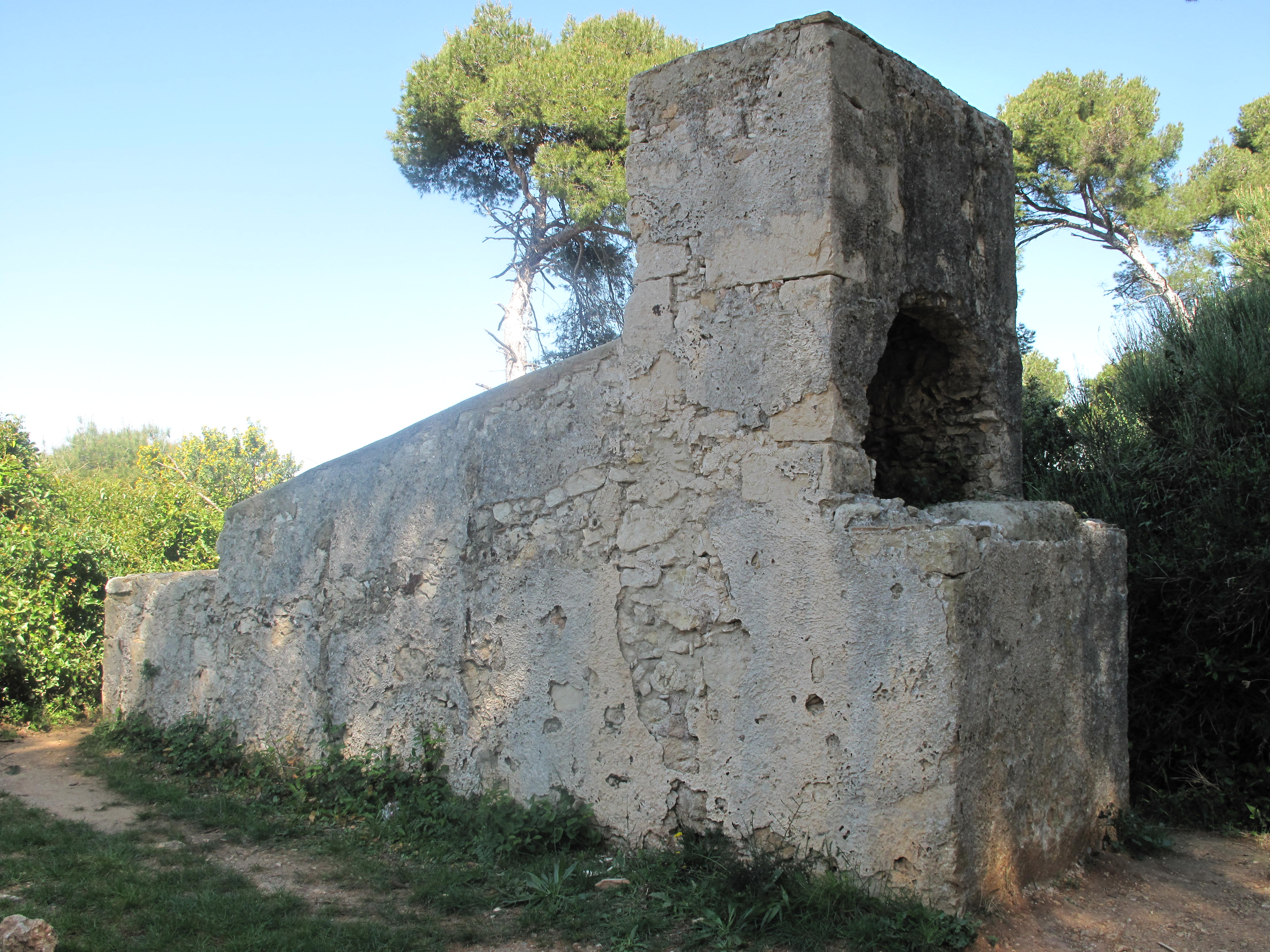
Île Saint-Honorat, France

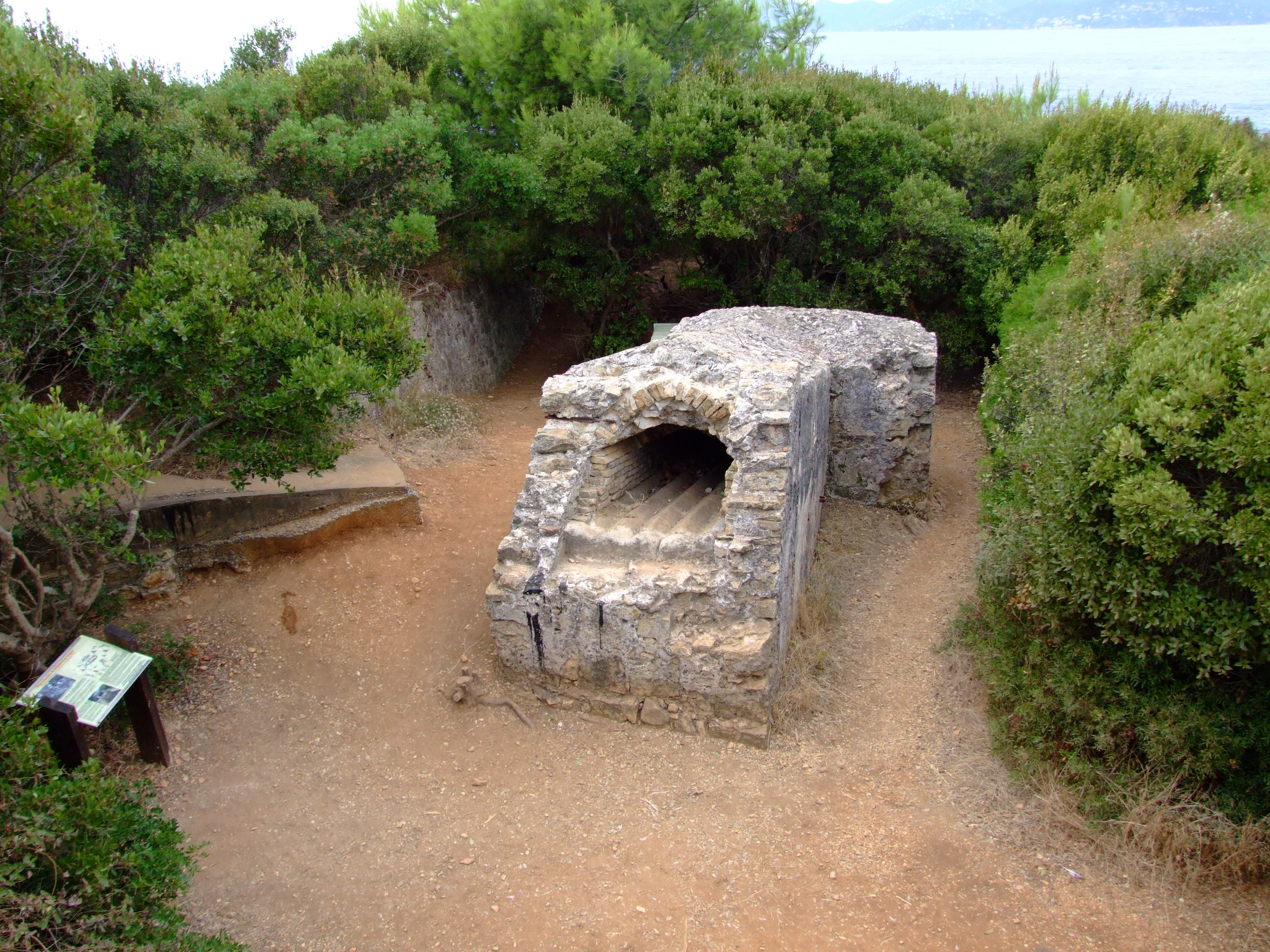
Île Sainte-Marguerite, France

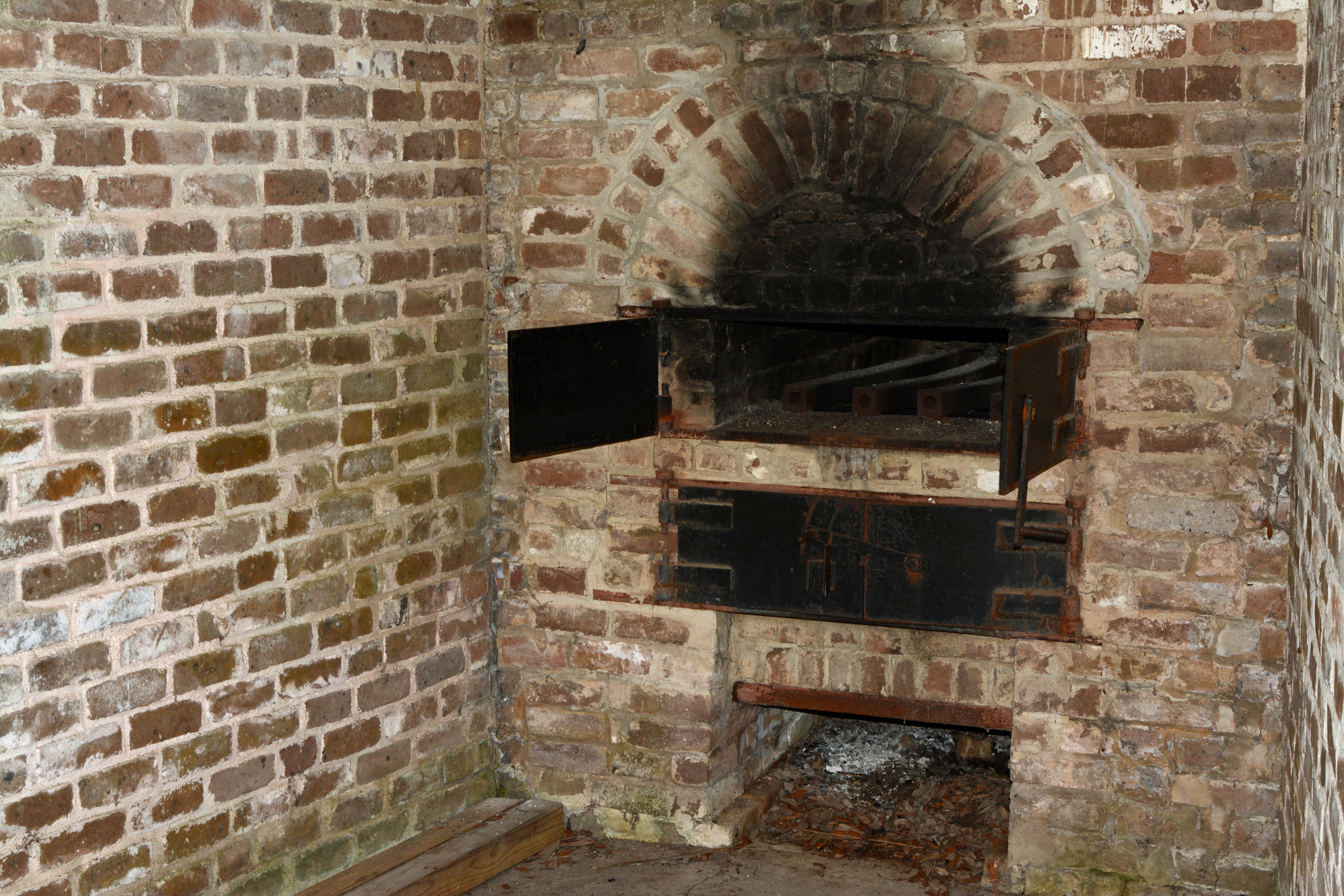
Hot Shot furnace at Fort McAllister

== See also ==
- Carcass (projectile)
- Chain-shot
- Grapeshot
- Round shot
- List of cannon projectiles
