= List of cannon projectiles =

A cannon is any large tubular firearm designed to fire a heavy projectile over a long distance. They were first used in Europe and China, and were the archetypical form of artillery. Round shot and grapeshot were the early projectiles used in cannon.

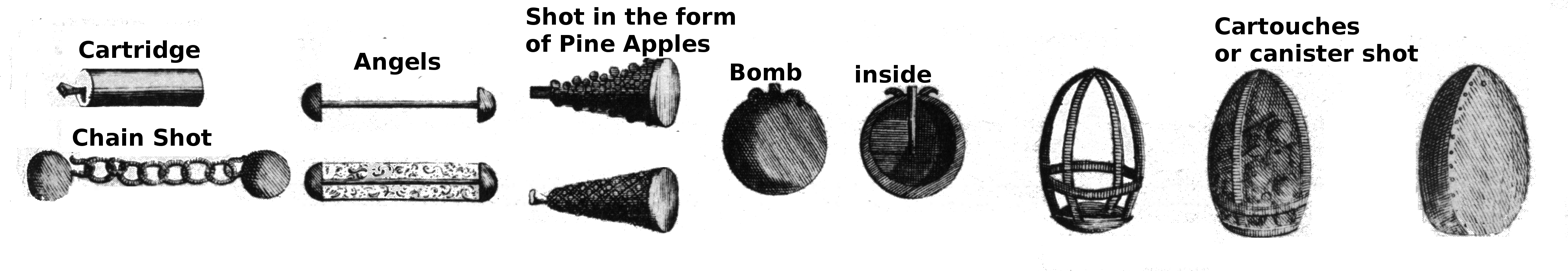
18th century cannon projectiles

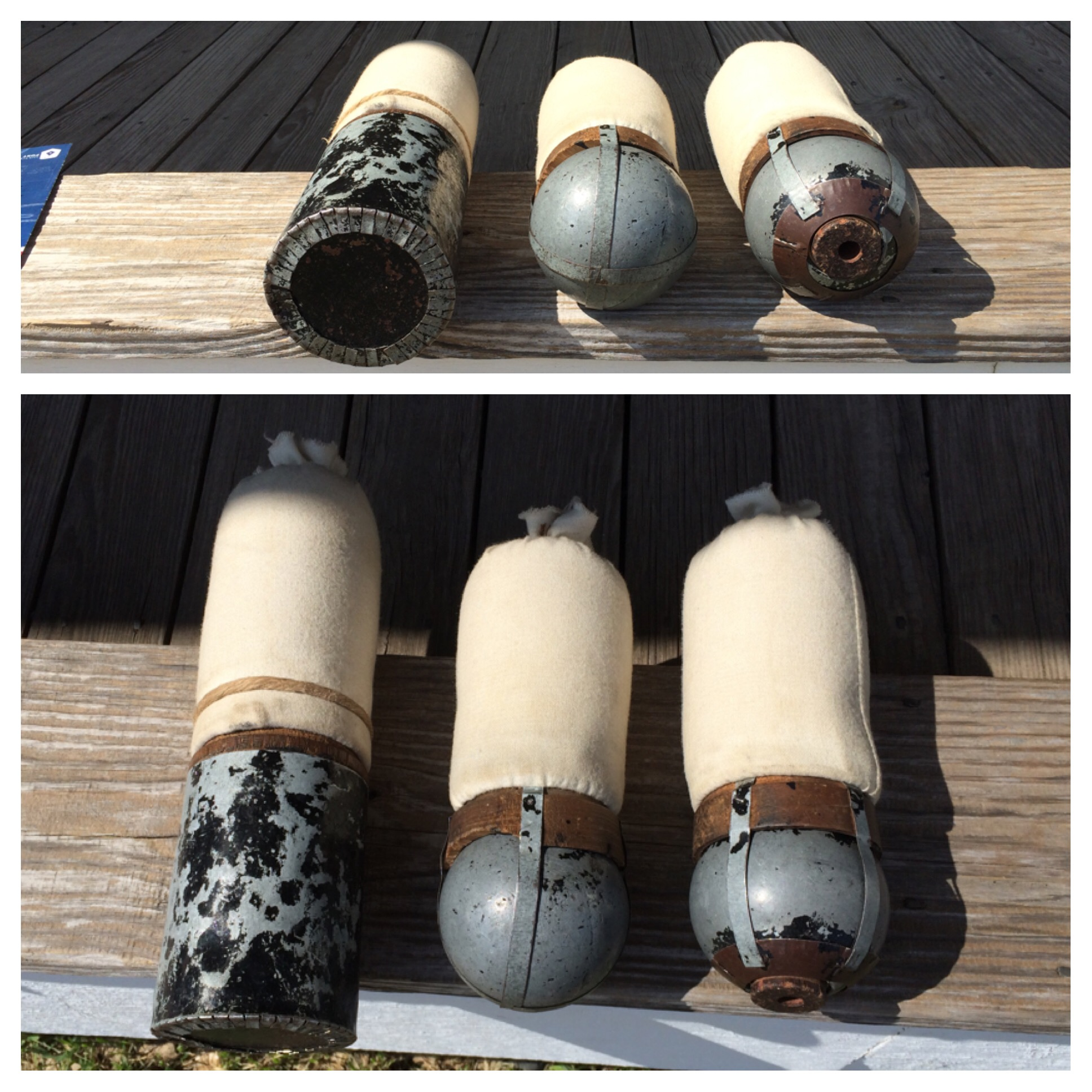
Three different cannon projectiles

== Projectiles fired from cannon ==
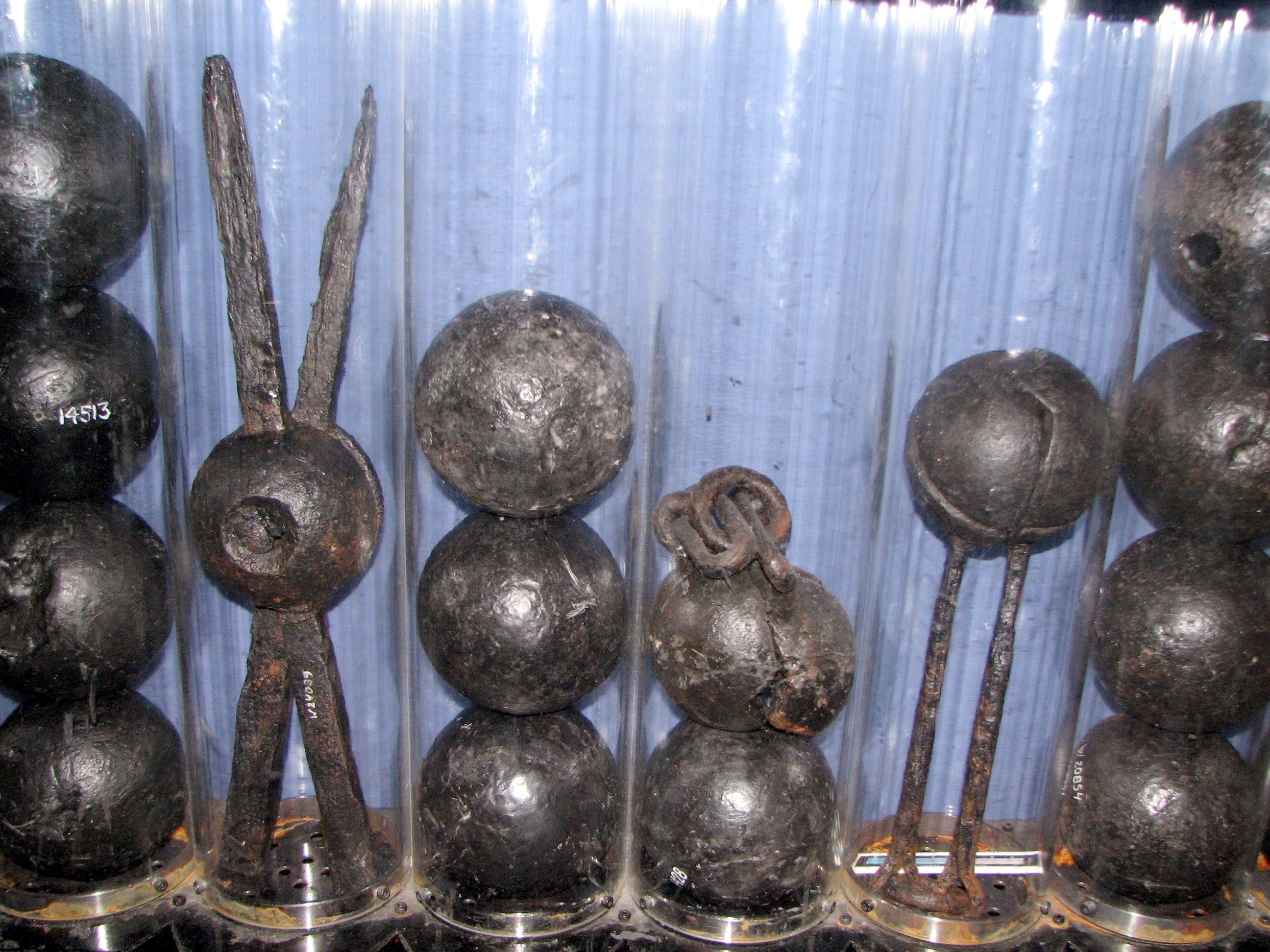
Different types of cannonballs recovered from the Vasa, sunk in 1628

Essential parts of a cannon: 1. the projectile or cannonball (shot) 2. gunpowder 3. touch hole (or vent) in which the fuse or other ignition device is inserted

Round shot or solid shot or a cannonball or simply ball
A solid spherical projectile made, in early times, from dressed stone but, by the 17th century, from iron. The most accurate projectile that could be fired by a smooth-bore cannon, used to batter the wooden hulls of opposing ships, forts, or fixed emplacements, and as a long-range anti-personnel weapon.
Chain shot or Split shot
Two sub-calibre round shot (a good deal smaller than the bore of the barrel) linked by a length of chain or a solid bar, and used to slash through the rigging and sails of an enemy ship so that it could no longer manoeuver. It was inaccurate and only used at close range. Two-headed bullets (angels) were similar but made of two halves of a ball rather than two balls.
Canister shot
An anti-personnel projectile which included many small iron round shot or lead musket balls in a metal can, which broke up when fired, scattering the shot throughout the enemy personnel, like a large shotgun.
Shrapnel or spherical case shot
An iron anti-personnel projectile containing an interior cavity packed with lead or iron round balls around a small bursting charge of just enough force to break open the thin-walled iron projectile. A powder train in a thin iron sleeve led to a time fuse inserted into a holder at the outer edge of the projectile. The fuse was designed to be ignited by flame from the propellant charge. Ideally the case shot fuse would detonate the central bursting charge when the projectile was six to ten feet above the heads of enemy infantry thereby showering them with the iron balls and fragments of the casing. (Invented 1784 by Lt. Henry Shrapnel, Royal Artillery, Great Britain).
Shell
An explosive anti-materiel and counter-battery projectile, of iron with a cavity packed with a high explosive bursting charge of powder used to destroy enemy wagons, breastworks, or opposing artillery. Two types of fuses were used—impact fuses that detonated the bursting charge by percussion, and time fuse cut to length measured in seconds and ignited by flame from the propellant charge.
Grapeshot
An anti-personnel weapon, similar to canister shot, but with the shot being contained in a canvas bag, and generally of a larger caliber. So called because of the resemblance of the clustered shot in the bag to a cluster of grapes on the vine. In one variation of this, the shot was held together by a coiled bar, and was spread by a fused charge in the same way as a shell. It was very effective against infantry, but its main shortcomings included very short range and ineffectiveness against infantry who had taken cover. Grapeshot was the starting point for the creation of shrapnel.
Carcass
An incendiary/antipersonnel projectile designed to burn fiercely and produce poisonous fumes. It was constructed of an iron frame bound with sack cloth and filled with various ingredients such as pitch, antimony, sulfur, saltpeter, tallow and venetian turpentine. It was ignited by the cannon's propellant charge, bursting on impact with the target and releasing noxious fumes while setting fire to its surroundings. It was effectively an early chemical weapon as well as an incendiary and area denial weapon. The name is possibly a reference to the medieval practice of hurling dead animals from trebuchet as a form of biological warfare, or because the circles which pass from one ring, or plate, to the other, were thought to resemble the ribs of a human carcass.
Heated (or hot) shot
A process where a solid iron cannonball is heated red hot in a specially designed wood- or coal-fired furnace and then is loaded in a muzzle-loading cannon, cushioned by a substantial thickness of wet wads, and is then fired while still red hot, at flammable targets with the intention of setting them on fire. This was a much advocated tactic (and many times a very successful one) for shore-based forts defending against attacks by wooden warships. Examples of these small brick furnaces may still be seen at permanently constructed pre-1860 forts in Europe and the United States. The adoption by most navies of iron-hulled ships generally made these obsolete. The shot was carried on a specially designed iron barrow or two-man litter and, in the era of black-powder cannon charges contained in cloth bags, occasioned much fanfare and notice as it was conveyed to the cannon muzzle as the red-hot projectile would easily ignite any carelessly handled loose powder. Any reckless or somewhat dangerous individual who seemed to draw trouble to themselves and those around them was referred to as a "Hot Shot", giving rise to the term in common use to this day.
Spider shot
Spider shot is a chain shot, but it has many chains instead of just one. It was not often used, despite its effectiveness against small ships and morale.
