= Spider shot =

Type of chain shot with multiple chains

- Type: Artillery ammunition

Production history
- Variants: Chain shot

Specifications
- Parent case: Chain shot

Spider shot was a variation of the chain shot artillery ammunition, but with additional chains. It was reportedly very underutilized, despite its apparent effectiveness against small ships.

== See also ==
- Round shot – Type of artillery projectile
- Heated shot – Ancient artillery technique
- Canister shot – Class of ammunition used by artillery
- Grapeshot – Type of ammunition consisting of multiple small balls
- Chain shot – Cannon projectile of two ball connected by chain
  - Bar shot – Cannon projectile of two balls connected by a rigid bar
