= Chain shot =

Cannon projectile of two ball connected by chain

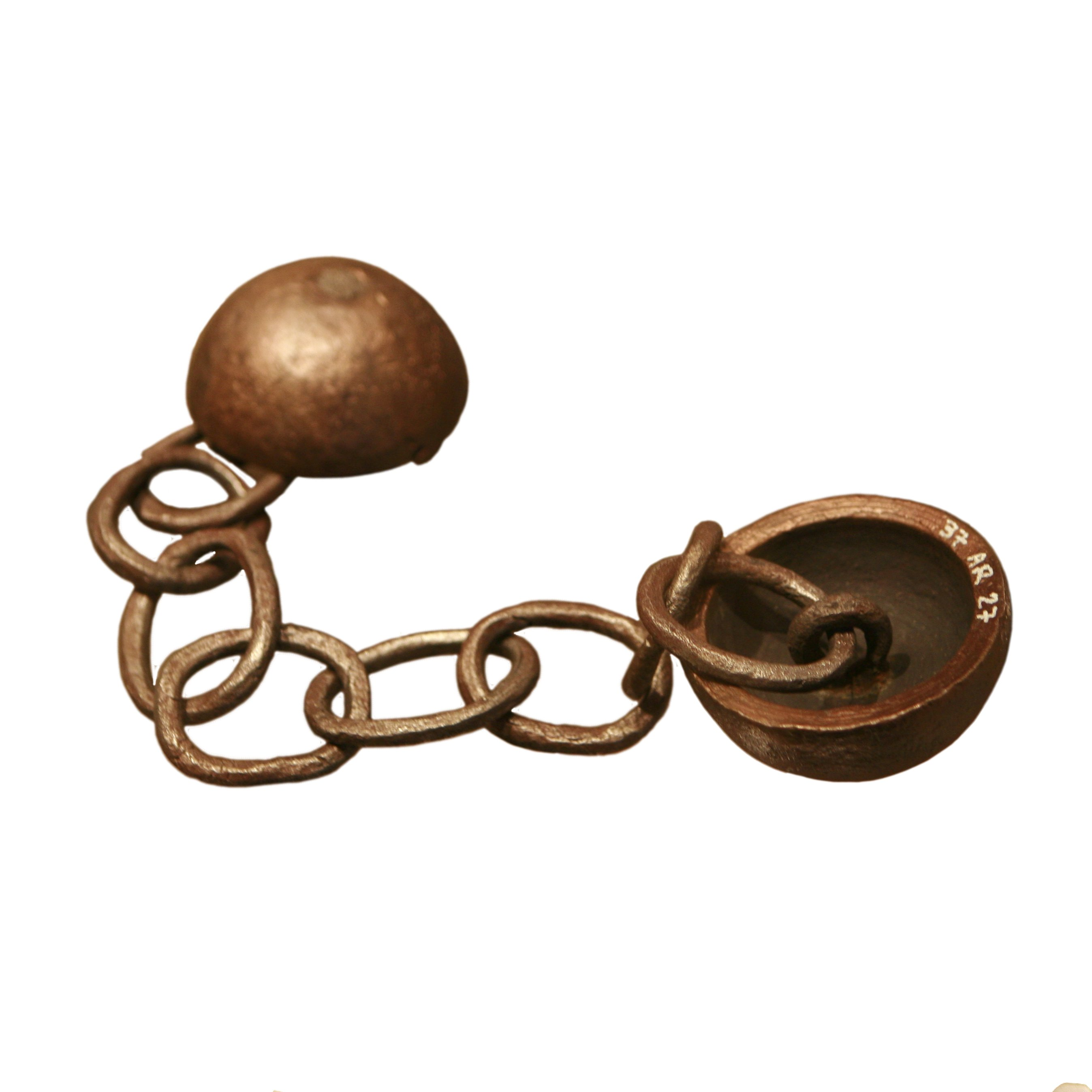
French chain shot

In artillery, chain shot is a type of cannon projectile formed of two sub-calibre balls, or half-balls, chained together. Bar shot is similar, but joined by a solid bar. They were used in the age of sailing ships and black powder cannon to shoot masts, or to cut the shrouds and any other rigging of a target ship.

When fired, after leaving the muzzle, the shot's components tumble in the air, and the connecting chain fully extends. In past use, as much as 1.8 m (6 ft) of chain would sweep through the target. However, the tumbling made both bar and chain shot less accurate, so they were used at shorter ranges.

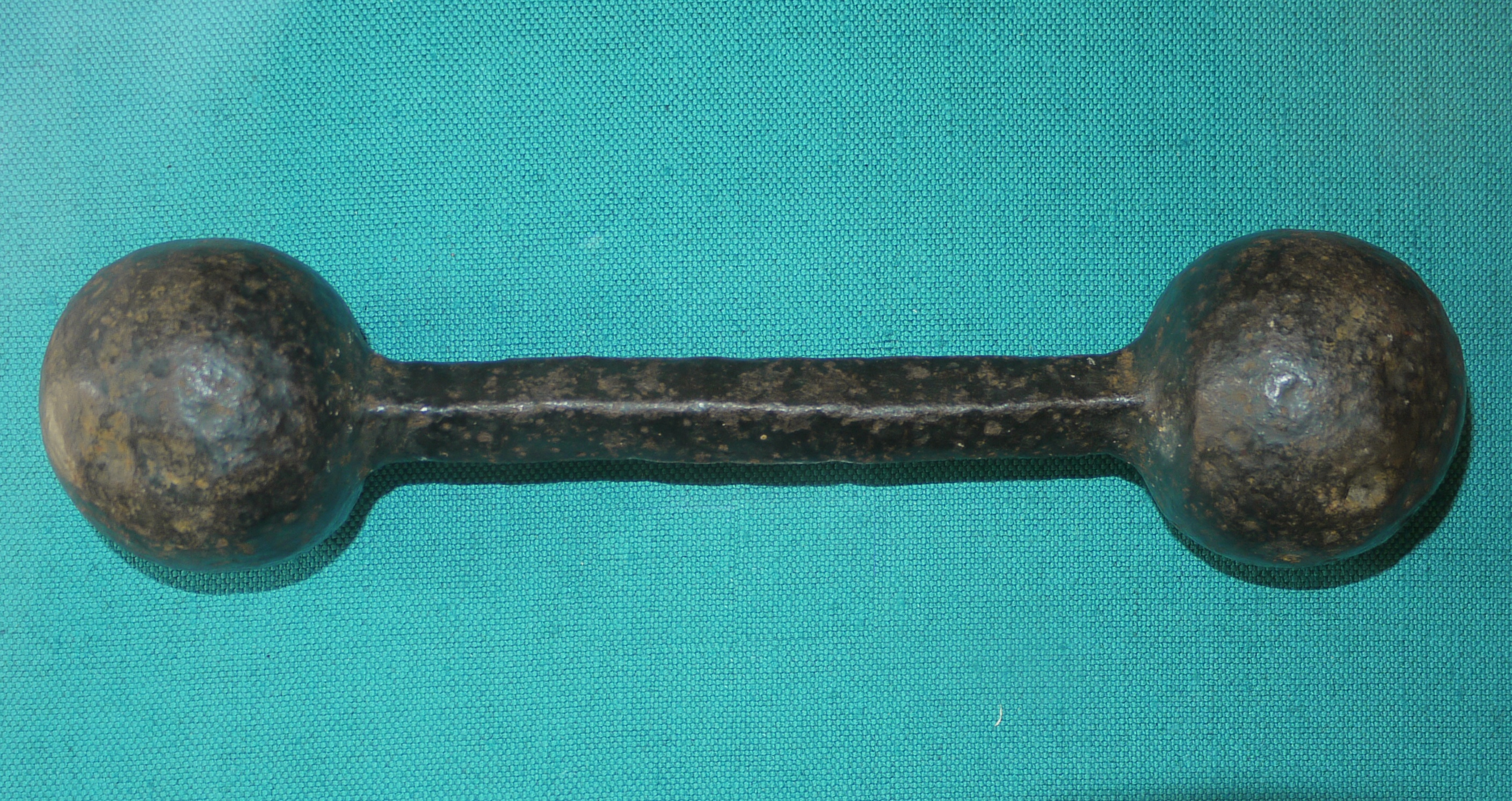
An example of bar shot

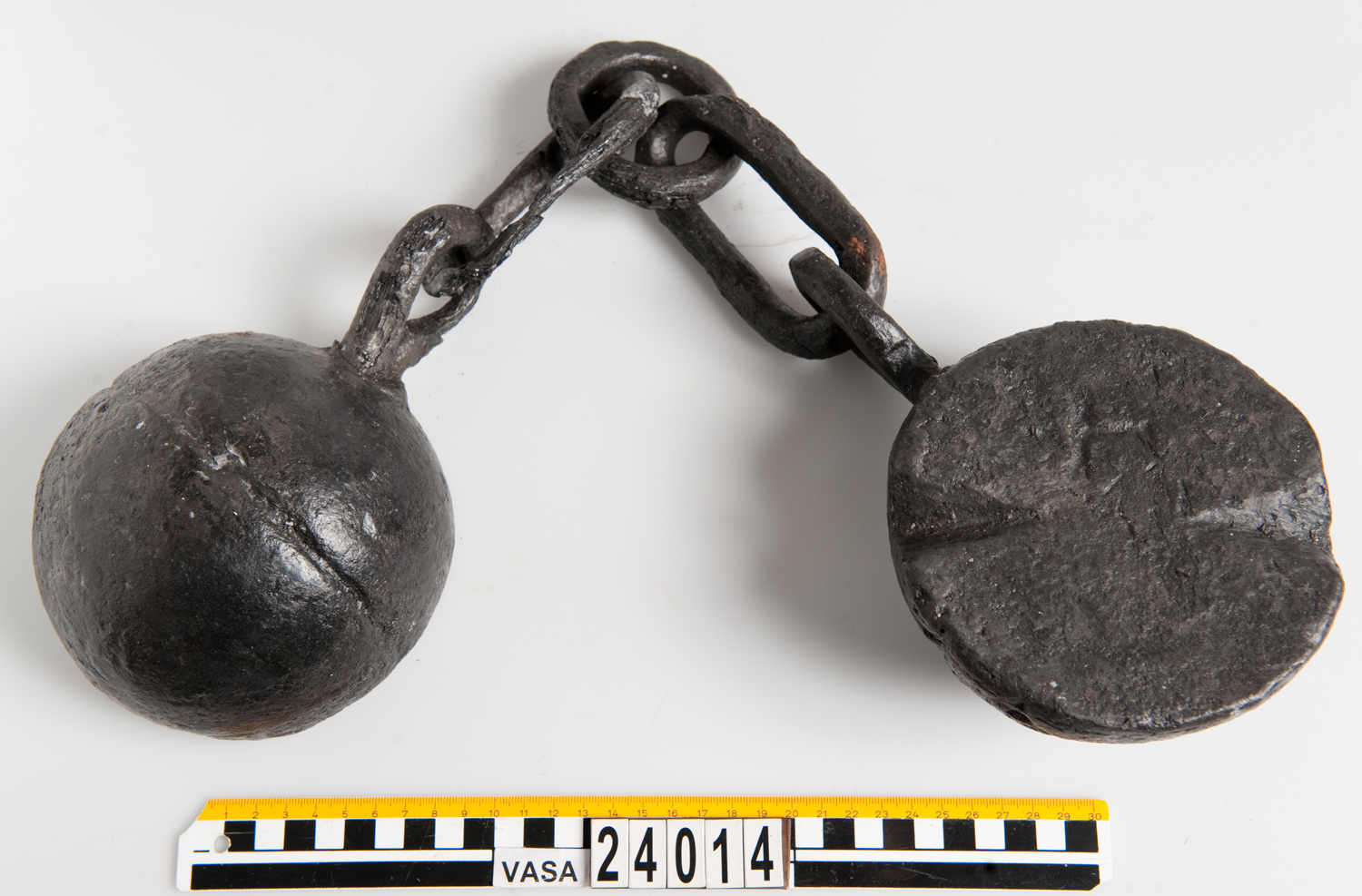
Chain shot salvaged from the Swedish warship Vasa which sank in 1628

Chain shot was sometimes used on land as an anti-personnel load. It was used by the defenders of Magdeburg in May 1631 as an anti-personnel load, which, according to counselor Otto von Guericke, was one reason for the extreme violence of the victorious attackers. It was also used against Parliamentarians in the first English Civil War, and against Cromwell in Ireland at the siege of Clonmel in 1650, against the 76th Regiment of Foot in India in 1803, and by the French against the Dutch at the Battle of Waterloo.

The military usefulness of chain shot died out as wooden sail-powered ships were replaced with armored steam ships—first among navies, and then among commercial fleets—which do not have rigging to serve as proper targets for chain-shot. Additionally, the conversion of naval armament from smoothbore, muzzle loaded, black powder cannon to rifled, breech-loaded guns further slowed the production of new chain shot ammunition; the chain would damage barrels (degrading maximum range, and further degrading effective range by degrading accuracy), and the new breech loading guns and their ammunition were meant to be effective against armored vessels as well as wooden sailing vessels.

In modern times, the effect is replicated in shotguns with the use of bolo shells, a pair of slugs connected by a strong wire. They are banned in several jurisdictions, including Florida and Illinois.

== See also ==
- Spider shot
