= Martha (given name) =

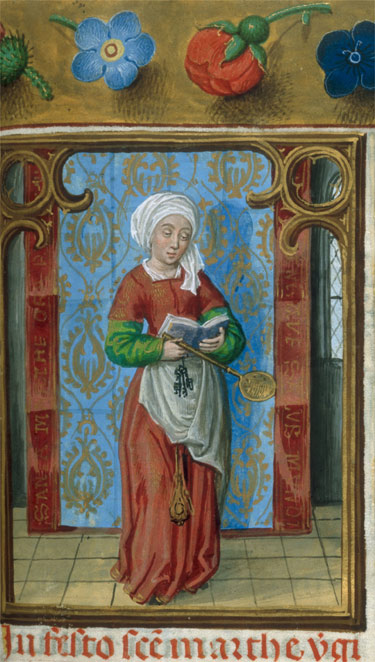
- Martha from the Isabella Breviary, 1497
- Gender: Female

Origin
- Origin: Greek & Aramaic
- Meaning: "mistress"

Other names
- Variant forms: Marfa, Marta, Marthe
- Related names: Marwa, Merve, Marva, Märta

Martha is a feminine given name (Latin from Ancient Greek Μάρθα (Mártha), from Aramaic מרתא (Mārtā) "the mistress" or "the lady", from מרה "mistress", feminine of מרי "master"). Patti, Patsy, and Patty were in use in Colonial America as English rhyming diminutives of the diminutive Mattie. Molly has been used as a diminutive of Martha since the 18th century.

Variants in different languages:

- Maata (Māori)
- Марфа (Marfa) (Russian and Belarusian), formerly spelled "Марѳа" from the Greek version of the name, that the Russians assimilate in F
- Márta (Hungarian)
- Marta, Martha (Indonesian)
- Marta (Catalan, Croatian, Czech, Danish, Estonian, Italian, Latvian, Norwegian, Polish, Portuguese, Romanian, Serbian, Slovak, Slovene, Spanish, Swedish)
- Марта (Marta) (Bulgarian, Macedonian, Ukrainian)
- Marthe (French, German, Dutch)
- Martta (Finnish)
- Moireach (Scottish Gaelic)
- Morta (Lithuanian)

== People with the name ==
- Saint Martha, several people
- Martha daughter of Boethus, 1st century Jewish woman
- Martha of Armagnac (1347–1378), French youngest child of John I, Count of Armagnac
- Martha of Denmark (1277–1341), Swedish Queen
- Princess Märtha Louise of Norway (born 1971), Norwegian princess and businesswoman
- Princess Märtha of Sweden (1901–1954), Swedish princess
- Martha A. B. Conine, American politician and women's suffragist
- Martha A. Boughton (1857–1928), American author, educator, poet, and clubwoman
- Martha A. Geer, American attorney, jurist, and former judge
- Martha A. Sandweiss (born 1954), American historian
- Martha A.Q. Curley (born 1952), American nurse
- Martha Abelsen (born 1957), Greenlandic politician
- Martha Ackelsberg (born 1946), American political scientist and women's studies scholar
- Martha Ackmann (born 1951), American author and journalist
- Martha Acosta (born 1962), Peruvian politician
- Martha Adelaide Holton (c. 1860-c. 1947), American writer
- Märtha Adlerstråhle (1868–1956), Swedish tennis player
- Martha Adusei (born 1976), Ghanaian-Canadian sprinter
- Martha Albertson Fineman (born 1943), American jurist, legal theorist, and political philosopher
- Martha Albrand (1914–1981), German-American novelist
- Martha Alf (1930–2019), American artist
- Martha Aliaga (1937–2011), Argentine statistics educator
- Martha Allan (1895–1942), Canadian pioneer of theater, actress, director, patron, and writer
- Martha Allen Sherwood (1948– 2020) – American lichenologist
- Martha Alter (1904–1976), American pianist, music teacher, and composer
- Martha Ama Akyaa Pobee, Ghanaian diplomat
- Martha Anderson, American research scientist, hydrologist, and remote sensing professional
- Martha Andresen Wilder (1944–2018), American Shakespearean scholar
- Martha Angélica Bernardino Rojas (born 1973), Mexican politician
- Martha Angélica Romo Jiménez (born 1961), Mexican politician
- Martha Angelici (1907–1973), French operatic soprano
- Martha Angle Dorsett (1851–1918), American lawyer
- Martha Ankomah (born 1986), Ghanaian film actress and entrepreneur
- Martha Ann Erskine Ricks (1817–1901), Americo-Liberian colonist, slave, and quilter
- Martha Anne Woodrum Zillhardt (1916–2002), American aviator
- Martha Ann Honeywell (1786–1856), American disabled artist
- Martha Annie Whiteley (1866–1956), English chemist and mathematician
- Martha Ansara (born 1942), American-born Australian documentary filmmaker, cinematographer, and screenwriter
- Martha Anthouli (born 2004), Greek professional volleyball player
- Martha Appiah (born 1965), Ghanaian sprinter
- Martha Araújo (born 1943), Brazilian sculptor and performance artist
- Martha Arendsee (1885–1953), German politician and women's rights activist
- Martha Argerich (born 1941), Argentine classical concert pianist
- Martha Ásdís Hjálmarsdóttir, Icelandic professor of biomedical science
- Martha Atwell (1900–1949), American radio director
- Martha Atwood (1886–1950), American operatic soprano and music educator
- Martha Austin Phelps (1870–1933), American chemist
- Martha B. Alexander (born 1939), American former politician
- Martha B. Briggs (1838–1889), American educator
- Martha B. Gould, American former government official
- Martha B. Sosman (1950–2007), American lawyer and jurist
- Martha Bablitch (1944–2007), American lawyer and jurist
- Martha Bachem (1924–2015), Austrian-German figure skater
- Martha Bailey, American professor of economics
- Martha Baillie (born 1960), Canadian poet and novelist
- Martha Baird Rockefeller (1895–1971), American pianist, philanthropist, and arts advocate
- Martha Baker (1838–1918), American Civil War nurse
- Martha Ballard (1735–1812), American midwife, healer, and mortician
- Martha Banks (born 1951), American clinical psychologist
- Martha Bárcena Coqui (born 1957), Mexican diplomat
- Martha Barnett (born 1947), American attorney
- Martha Barnette (born 1957), American writer, radio host, and public speaker
- Martha Barnhart, American civic leader
- Martha Bartlett, South African politician
- Martha Bass (1921–1998), American gospel singer
- Martha Batalha (born 1974), Brazilian writer and journalist
- Martha Bátiz (born 1971), Mexican-Canadian writer
- Martha Bayard Stevens (1831–1899), American philanthropist
- Martha Bayles (born 1948), American author, critic, and professor
- Martha Bayona (born 1995), Colombian track cyclist
- Martha Beauclerk (1709/1710-1788), British courtier
- Martha Beck (born 1962), American author, life coach, speaker, and sociologist
- Martha Beck (serial killer) (1920–1951), American nurse executed for murder
- Martha Beers, American traditional folk music singer
- Martha Benjamin (born 1935), Canadian Indigenous cross country skier
- Martha Bensley Bruère (1879–1953), American writer, painter, and reformer
- Martha Berenice Álvarez Tovar (born 1975), Mexican politician
- Martha Berkeley (1813–1899), Australian artist
- Martha Bernal, several people
- Martha Bernays (1861–1951), German-born Austrian wife of Sigmund Freud
- Martha Berry (1865–1942), American educator
- Martha Berry (artist), American Cherokee beadwork artist
- Martha Betz Shapley (1890–1981), American astronomer
- Martha Bielish (1915–2010), Canadian politician, farmer, feminist, and teacher
- Martha Biilmann (1921–2008), Greenlandic furrier and educator
- Martha Biondi, American historian and professor
- Martha Bissah (born 1997), Ghanaian athlete
- Martha Bissmann (born 1980), Austrian politician
- Martha Black (1866–1957), Canadian politician
- Martha Black (art historian) (born 1945), Canadian art historian
- Martha Blackford (1775–1846), pen name of Isabella Moncrieff, Scottish writer
- Martha Blackman (1927–2021), American musician and educator
- Martha Bloom, American artist and academic
- Martha Blount (1690–1762), English woman who befriended many English literary figures
- Martha Blue (born c. 1942), American lawyer and author
- Martha Blum (1913–2007), Austro-Hungarian Empire-born Canadian writer
- Martha Boaz (1911–1995), American librarian
- Martha Bodunrin (born 1952), Nigerian politician
- Martha Boesing (born 1936), American theater director and playwright
- Martha Bolaños de Prado (1897–1963), Guatemalan actress, musician, composer, and educator
- Martha Boneta, American policy advisor, commentator, and farmer
- Martha Boswell (1905–1958), American jazz singer, pianist, and member of the vocal group The Boswell Sisters
- Martha Boto (1925–2004), Argentine artist
- Martha Bowen (born 1980), American retired swimmer
- Martha Braddell, English contestant on Britain's Next Top Model (series 4)
- Martha Bradley, 18th century English food writer and chef
- Martha Bratton (c. 1749/1750-1816), American patriot during the Revolutionary War
- Martha Brill Olcott (born 1949), American scholar on Central Asian studies
- Martha Broadus Anderson (1875–1967), American singer, musician, music educator, and choral director
- Martha Brockenbrough, American author
- Martha Brookes Hutcheson (1871–1959), American landscape architect, lecturer, and author
- Martha Brooks (born 1944), Canadian writer of plays, novels, and short fiction
- Martha Brossier (1556-after 1600), French woman known for claiming demonic possession
- Martha Brown, several people
- Martha Bruce, Countess of Elgin and Kincardine (1739–1810), Scottish countess, governess, and educator
- Martha-Bryan Allen (1903–1985), American stage actress
- Märtha Brydolf (1868–1956), Swedish politician and journalist
- Martha Bucaram (1941–1981), Ecuadorian lawyer, feminist, and First Lady of Ecuador
- Martha Bulloch Roosevelt (1835–1884), American socialite
- Martha Bullock (1849–1939), American pioneer
- Martha Bunting (1861–1944), American biologist and teacher
- Martha Burk (born 1941), American political psychologist and feminist
- Martha Burkhardt (1874–1956), Swiss painter and photographer
- Martha Burns (born 1957), Canadian actress
- Martha Burton (1913–2007), American pioneer in bowling
- Martha Burton Williamson (1843–1922), American malacologist and journalist
- Martha Byrne (born 1969), American actress, singer, and television writer
- Martha C. Howell, American historian and emerita professor
- Martha C. Ruth, Guamanian politician
- Martha Cahoon (1905–1999), American artist
- Martha Callanan (1826–1901), American women's suffrage advocate, newspaper publisher, and philanthropist
- Martha Callison Horst (born 1967), American composer
- Martha Canga Antonio (born 1995), Belgian/Angolan actress and singer
- Martha Carrier (Salem witch trials) (1650–1692), American Puritan executed for witchcraft
- Martha Carrillo (born 1963), Mexican journalist and writer
- Martha Carson (1921–2004), American gospel-country music singer
- Martha Cartmell (1845–1945), Canadian Methodist/United Church missionary and educator in Japan
- Martha Cassell Thompson (1925–1968), American architect
- Martha Cecilia (1953–2014), Filipino writer of Tagalog romance pocketbook novels
- Martha Cecilia Díaz Gordillo (born 1967), Mexican politician
- Martha Cecilia Ruiz (born 1972), Nicaraguan poet, writer, journalist, and social activist
- Martha Chanjo Lunji (?-2021), Malawian politician
- Martha Chase (1927–2003), American geneticist
- Martha Chaves, Nicaraguan-Canadian comedian, actress, activist, and playwright
- Martha Chávez (born 1953), Peruvian politician and lawyer
- Martha Cheavens (1899–1975), American novelist, short-story writer, and poet
- Martha Chen (born 1944), American academic, scholar, and social worker
- Martha Cheney (born 1953), American author and lyricist
- Martha Cheung (1953–2013), Hong Kong researcher and scholar of translation studies
- Martha Chickering (1886–1988), American social work educator
- Martha Chikuni (1974–2021), Malawian journalist, television personality, and diplomat
- Martha Chizuma, Malawian lawyer
- Martha Choe (born 1954), American banker, politician, and foundation executive
- Martha Chol Luak, South Sudanese politician
- Martha Christensen (1932–2017), American mycologist, botanist, and educator
- Martha Christensen (Danish writer) (1928–1996), Danish writer and educator
- Martha Christie (born 1979), Australian model and violist
- Martha Christina Tiahahu (1800–1818), Moluccan freedom fighter and Indonesian heroine
- Martha Clare Morris (1955–2020), American nutritional epidemiologist
- Martha Clark, several people
- Martha Clarke (born 1944), American theater director and choreographer
- Martha Clayton (1915–1961), American who posthumously posted her husband's writings
- Martha Clokie, English professor of microbiology
- Martha Coakley (born 1953), American lobbyist, lawyer, and former politician
- Martha Codman Karolik (1858–1948), American philanthropist and art collector
- Martha Cohen (1920–2015), Canadian community activist and philanthropist
- Martha Colburn (born 1972), American filmmaker and artist
- Martha Coldwell (born 2010), Mexican rhythmic gymnast
- Martha Cole (born 1946), Canadian artist
- Martha Collins, several people
- Martha Collison (born 1996), British baker and food columnist
- Martha Combe (1806–1893), British art collector
- Martha Concepción Figueroa (born 1952), Honduran teacher and politician
- Martha Conger Neblett Hagar (1886–1973), birth name of Connie Hagar, American birdwatcher and naturalist
- Martha Constantine-Paton, American neuroscientist and professor
- Martha Cooksey (born 1954), American former long-distance runner
- Martha Coolidge (born 1946), American film- and television director
- Martha Cooper, American photojournalist
- Martha Cope, British actress
- Martha Copeland (c. 1891-1894-?), American classic blues singer
- Martha Copp, American sociologist and professor
- Martha Córdova Bernal (born 1967), Mexican politician
- Martha Corey (?-1692), American executed for witchcraft
- Martha Coston (1826–1904), American inventor and businesswoman
- Martha Crago, Canadian anthropologist, sociologist, linguist, and academic
- Martha Craig (1866–1950), Northern Irish explorer, writer, and lecturer
- Martha Craig Daughtrey (born 1942), American circuit judge
- Martha Crawford Heitzmann (born 1967), American businesswoman
- Martha Crenshaw (born 1945), American political scientist and professor of terrorism
- Martha Crone (1894–1989), American botanist and horticulturist
- Martha Crossley (1775–1854), British carpet manufacturer
- Martha Cunz (1876–1961), Swiss artist
- Martha Curnutt Casto (1812–1887), American convicted murderer
- Martha Custis, several people
- Martha D. Lincoln (1838–1911), American author and journalist
- Martha Dana Mercer (1872–1960), American art collector and philanthropist
- Martha Daniell Logan (1704–1779), American botanist
- Martha Darley Mutrie (1824–1885), British painter
- Martha Daunke (1899–1967), German chess player
- Martha Davis, several people
- Martha de la Torre (born 1957), Ecuadorian American publisher and entrepreneur
- Martha De Laurentiis (1954–2021), American film producer
- Martha Delgado Peralta (born 1969), Mexican environmentalist and politician
- Martha Del Valle (born 1988), Mexican dressage rider
- Martha deMey Clow (1932–2010), American writer of science fiction
- Martha Denny (1505–1572), English Catholic recusant
- Martha Derthick (1933–2015), American public administration scholar and academic
- Martha de San Bernardo, 17th century Filipino Roman Catholic nun
- Martha Desrumeaux (1897–1982), French militant communist
- Martha Dewing Woodward (1856–1950), American artist and art teacher
- Martha Diamond (born 1944), American painter
- Martha Diaz (born 1969), Colombian-American community organizer, media producer, archivist, curator, and social entrepreneur
- Martha Dilys Buckley-Jones, Canadian former diplomat
- Martha Diplock, Canadian athlete in the 1968 Winter Olympics
- Martha Dix (1895–1985), German goldsmith and silversmith
- Martha Doan (1872–1960), American chemist
- Martha Dodd (1908–1990), American journalist and novelist
- Martha Dodray, Indian polio worker
- Martha Dübber, German film editor
- Martha Dunagin Saunders, American professor and academic official
- Martha Durward Farquharson (1847–1929), Irish-born Australian administrator, nurse, and private hospital owner
- Martha E. Cram Bates (1839–1905), American writer, journalist, and newspaper editor
- Martha E. Forrester (1863–1951), American clubwoman, educator, and civil rights activist
- Martha E. Pollack (born 1958), American computer scientist
- Martha E. Sewall Curtis (1858–1915), American suffragist and writer
- Martha E. Sloan (born 1939), American electrical engineer
- Martha E. Whitten (1842–1917), American author
- Martha Edelheit (born 1931), American-born Swedish artist
- Martha Edgerton Rolfe Plassmann (1850–1936), American feminist and socialist
- Martha Ehlin (1977–2016), Swedish sports teacher
- Martha Elena García Gómez (born 1945), Mexican politician
- Martha Elena Ruiz Sevilla, Nicaraguan politician and lawyer
- Martha Elizabeth Burchfield Richter (1924–1977), American watercolorist
- Martha Elizabeth Duncan Walker Cook (1806–1874), American author, translator, and editor
- Martha Elizabeth Newton (1941–2020), British bryologist and botanist
- Martha Elizabeth Stebbins, American epidemiologist, zoologist, mechanical engineer, veterinarian, and Episcopalian prelate
- Martha Elizabeth Zitter, 17th century Roman Catholic German nun
- Martha Ellen Reeves, American professor and academic
- Martha Ellen Young Truman (1852–1947), American mother of U.S. president Harry S. Truman
- Martha Ellicott Tyson (1795–1873), American Quaker, college founder, and civil rights- and women's rights activist
- Martha Elvira Stone (1816–1900), American postmaster, genealogist, and teacher
- Martha Érika Alonso (1973–2018), Mexican politician
- Martha Eriksdotter, 13th century Swedish princess
- Martha Ernstdóttir (born 1964), Icelandic long-distance runner
- Martha Ertman (born c. 1964), American law professor and writer
- Martha Escutia (born 1957), American politician and attorney
- Martha Evens (born 1935), American emeritus professor and computer scientist
- Martha Ezzard (born 1938), American politician
- Martha F. Gerry (1918–2007), American racehorse owner
- Martha Farah (born 1955), American cognitive neuroscience researcher
- Martha Farkas Glaser (1921–2014), American manager, producer, civil rights activist, publicist, and author
- Martha Farmer Brewer (1928–2006), American wife of governor Albert Brewer
- Martha Farnsworth Riche (born 1939), American economist and census director
- Martha Farrell (1959–2015), Indian civil society leader
- Martha Feldman (musicologist) (born 1954), American musicologist and cultural historian
- Martha Feltus, American politician
- Marthã Fernando Gonçalves Pimenta (born 1997), Brazilian footballer
- Martha Field (born 1943), American legal scholar and professor
- Martha Fiennes (born 1964), English film director, writer, and producer
- Martha Fierro (born 1977), American-born Ecuadorian chess player
- Martha Finley (1828–1909), American teacher and author
- Martha Finnemore (born 1959), American constructivist scholar of international relations, and professor
- Martha Firestone Ford (born 1925), American businesswoman
- Martha Fleming (born 1958), Canadian museum professional and academic
- Martha Foley (1897–1977), American magazine editor and suffragist
- Martha Foote Crow (1854–1924), American educator and writer
- Martha Foster, several people
- Martha Fowke (1689–1736), English poet
- Martha Frankel (born 1953), American writer
- Martha Frayde (1920–2013), Cuban doctor, dissident, and revolutionary
- Martha Frederikke Johannessen (1907–1973), Norwegian politician
- Martha Frick Symington Sanger (born 1941), American writer
- Martha Friedman (born 1975), American sculptor and college professor
- Martha G. Scott (born 1935), American politician
- Martha G. Thorwick (1863–1921), Norwegian-born American clubwoman and medical doctor
- Martha G. Welch (born 1944), American physician and researcher
- Märtha Gahn (1881–1973), Swedish textile artist
- Martha Gallison Moore Avery (1851–1929), American socialist turned Catholic anti-Socialism activist
- Martha Gandy Fales (1930–2006), American art historian, museum curator, and author
- Martha García (rower) (born 1965), Mexican rower
- Martha Garcia (Arizona politician), American former politician
- Martha García Müller (born 1946), Mexican politician
- Martha Gardener (1905–1991), Australian radio presenter and television personality
- Martha Gay Masterson (1837–1916), American settler
- Martha Gehman (born 1955), American actress and acting coach
- Martha Gellhorn (1908–1998), American journalist, novelist, and travel writer
- Martha Genenger (1911–1995), German swimmer
- Martha "Geney" Crutchley (?-2002), American murder victim
- Martha George (1892–1987), Native American leader and politician
- Martha Gibson, Canadian actress
- Martha Giffard (1639–1722), English letter writer and biographer
- Martha Gillette, American chronobiologist and neurobiologist
- Martha Gilmore (born c. 1974), American planetary geologist and professor
- Martha Gilmore Robinson (1888–1981), American women's rights- and civic activist
- Martha Givaudan (born 1956), Mexican psychologist
- Martha Gladtved-Prahl (1891–1973), Norwegian politician
- Martha Gnudi (1908–1976), American medical historian and translator
- Martha Goldberg (1873–1938), German social activist and Jewish murder victim
- Martha Goldstein (1919–2014), American harpsichordist and pianist
- Martha Gonzalez (1971–2007), Colombian woman whose case instigated abortion reforms
- Martha Gonzalez (musician), Chicana artist, activist, musician, feminist music theorist, and professor
- Martha Goodway, American metallurgist
- Martha Goodwin Tunstall (1838–1911), American abolitionist and Unionist
- Martha Graham (1894–1991), American modern dancer and choreographer
- Martha Gray, American biomedical engineer and professor
- Martha Greenblatt (born 1941), Hungarian-born American chemist, researcher, and university faculty member
- Martha Greenhouse (1921–2013), American stage-, film-, and television actress
- Martha Greta Kempton (1901–1991), American White House artist
- Martha Grey, Countess of Stamford (c. 1838–1916), South African-born English countess
- Martha Griffiths (1912–2003), American lawyer and judge
- Martha Griggs (born 1953), Canadian equestrian
- Martha Grimes (born 1931), American writer of detective fiction
- Martha Grossenbacher (born 1959), Dutch retired sprinter
- Martha Grover, American chemical engineer and professor
- Martha Gruening (1889–1937), American-Jewish journalist, poet, suffragette, and civil rights activist
- Martha Gularte (1919–2002), Uruguayan dancer, poet and vedette
- Martha Gulati (born 1969), American physician and former university faculty member
- Martha Gultom (born 1939), Indonesian former swimmer
- Martha Gunn (1726–1815), English dipper
- Martha Gurney (1733–1816), English printer, bookseller, publisher, and abolitionist activist
- Martha Gustafson (born 1950), Mexican-Canadian Paralympic athlete
- Martha Guthrie (1894–1941), American tennis player
- Martha Gutiérrez Manrique (born 1960), Mexican politician
- Martha Guzmán Partida, Mexican mathematician
- Martha H. Mowry (1818–1899), American physician
- Martha H. Tingey (1857–1938), American Mormon leader
- Martha Hackett (born 1961), American actress
- Martha Haines (1923–2011), American AAGPBL player
- Martha Haines Butt (1833–1871), American author and suffragist
- Martha Hall Findlay (born 1959), Canadian businesswoman, entrepreneur, lawyer, and politician
- Martha Hall Foose, American chef and author
- Martha Harley, 18th century English novelist
- Martha Harpf (1874–1942), German politician
- Martha Harris (psychoanalyst) (1919–1987), British psychoanalyst
- Martha Harris (footballer) (born 1994), English footballer
- Martha Hart (born 1966), Canadian philanthropist, researcher, and charity benefactor
- Martha Hatfield (1640-?), English Puritan prophet
- Martha Haylett (born 1991), Australian politician
- Martha Hayne Talbot (born 1932), American conservation activist, biologist, author, and ecologist
- Martha Hedman (1883–1974), Swedish-American stage actress
- Martha Heesen (born 1948), Dutch writer
- Martha Helen Beal (1879–1931), American homesteader
- Martha Hellion (born 1937), Mexican visual artist, radical publisher, and freelance curator
- Martha Henderson (born 1968), Canadian sailor
- Martha Hennessey (born 1954), American politician
- Martha Hennessy (born 1955), American Catholic peace activist
- Martha Henry (1938–2021), American-born Canadian stage-, film-, and television actress
- Martha Herbert, American physician, assistant professor of neurology, and pediatric neurologist
- Martha Heredia (born 1991), Dominican singer
- Martha Hernández, Mexican former tennis player
- Martha Higareda (born 1983), Mexican actress, producer, and screenwriter
- Martha High (born 1945), American singer
- Martha Hilda González Calderón (born 1965), Mexican lawyer and politician
- Martha Hildebrandt (1925–2022), Peruvian linguist and politician
- Martha Hill (1900–1995), American dance instructor
- Martha Hill (skier), American Paralympic alpine skier
- Martha Himmelfarb (born 1954), American scholar of religion and Judaism
- Martha Hodes (born 1958), American historian
- Martha Blakeney Hodges (1897–1969), American political hostess
- Martha Hollander (born 1959), American poet and art historian
- Martha Holliday (1922–1970), American actress and dancer
- Martha Holmes, several people
- Martha Hooper Blackler Kalopothakes (1830–1871), 19th century American missionary, journalist, and translator
- Martha Hopkins Struever (1931–2017), American Indian art dealer, author, and scholar
- Martha Howe-Douglas (born 1980), English actress and writer
- Martha Seavey Hoyt, American biographer, newspaper correspondent, businesswoman
- Martha Hudson (born 1939), American retired sprinter
- Martha Hughes Cannon (1857–1932), American politician, physician, women's rights advocate, suffragist, and Mormon polygamous wife
- Martha Hunt (born 1989), American fashion model
- Martha Hyer (1924–2014), American actress
- Martha Imalwa, Namibian lawyer
- Martha Isaacs (?-1840), English painter
- Martha Isabel Ruiz Corzo (born 1953), Mexican environmentalist
- Martha Israel (1905-c. 1967), German clerk and politician
- Martha Issová (born 1981), Czech film-, television-, and stage actress
- Martha Ittuluka'naaq (1912–1981), Inuk artist
- Martha J. Bergmark, American attorney, civil rights advocate, and writer
- Martha J. Fleischman, American art dealer
- Martha J. Harvey, Canadian historian
- Martha J. Lamb (1826–1893), American author, editor, and historian
- Martha J. Ross (1923–2013), American oral historian
- Martha Jachi Umbulla (1955–2021), Tanzanian politician
- Martha Jackman, Canadian professor of law
- Martha Jackson (1907–1969), American art dealer, gallery owner, and collector
- Martha Jackson Jarvis (born 1952), American artist
- Martha Jane Bury (1850–1913), English suffragist
- Martha Jane Canary (1852–1903), birth name of Calamity Jane, American frontierswoman, sharpshooter, and storyteller
- Martha Jane Cunningham (1856–1916), Canadian missionary educator in Japan
- Martha Jane Knowlton Coray (1821–1881), American Mormon pioneer, record keeper, and educator
- Martha Jane Pettway (1898–2003), American artist and quilter
- Martha Janet Lafferty (1921–2007), birth name of Janet Blair, American big-band singer and actress
- Martha Jayne Keys (1892–1975), American Christian minister
- Martha Jean-Claude (1919–2001), Haitian writer, civil rights activist, entertainer, and composer
- Martha Jean Lambert (born 1973), American missing female
- Martha Jean Steinberg (1930–2000), American radio broadcaster and pastor
- Martha Jefferson (1748–1782), American wife of U.S. president Thomas Jefferson
- Martha Jefferson Carr, American sister of Thomas Jefferson
- Martha Jefferson Randolph (1772–1836), American oldest daughter of Thomas Jefferson
- Martha Jeffries (born 1978), New Zealand filmmaker
- Martha Jenks Chase (1851–1925), American doll designer, manufacturer, entrepreneur, and Progressive reformer
- Martha Jiménez, Cuban artist
- Martha Jiménez Oropeza (born 1964), Mexican politician
- Martha Joan Douglass (1924–2016), American politician
- Martha Johnson, several people
- Martha Josey (born 1938), American professional rodeo cowgirl
- Martha Joy (born 1990), Filipino-Canadian singer
- Martha Joy Gottfried (1925–2014), American-born Mexican landscape painter
- Martha Julia, Mexican actress
- Martha K. Schwebach (born 1939), American nurse practitioner
- Martha Kalifatidis, Australian contestant on Married at First Sight (Australian TV series)
- Martha Kanter, American former government official
- Martha Kantor (1896–1981), American glass painter
- Martha Kaplan (born 1957), American cultural anthropologist
- Martha Karagianni (1939–2022), Greek film actress
- Martha Karua (born 1957), Kenyan politician
- Martha Kay Renfroe (1938–2016), American writer of mystery and science fiction
- Martha Kearney (born 1957), British-Irish journalist and broadcaster
- Martha Kelly (born 1968), American stand-up comedian and actress
- Martha Kelner (born c. 1990), British journalist and sportswriter
- Martha Kennedy (born 1951), American author and curator
- Martha Keys (born 1930), American retired politician
- Martha Kimball (1840–1894), American philanthropist
- Martha King (c. 1803–1897), New Zealand botanical illustrator
- Martha Kinney Cooper (1874–1964), American librarian and wife of governor Myers Y. Cooper
- Martha Kinsey (1907-1910-?), American tennis player and golfer
- Martha Kirkpatrick (1925–2015), American psychoanalyst and clinical professor of psychiatry
- Martha Kleedörfer (born 1998), German politician
- Martha Klein, British philosopher
- Martha Kneale (1909–2001), British philosopher
- Martha Kneifel, German woman in the 1994 documentary film Martha & Ethel
- Martha Komu (born 1983), Kenyan runner
- Martha Koome (born 1960), Kenyan advocate, lawyer, and judge
- Martha Kostuch (1949–2008), Canadian veterinarian and environmentalist
- Martha Krebs, American theoretical physicist
- Martha Kreutz, American former politician
- Martha Krug-Genthe (1871–1945), German geographer
- Martha Kumsa, Ethiopian 1989 winner of the PEN American Center inactive awards
- Martha Kunig-Rinach (1898–1993), German actress and operetta singer
- Martha Kuwee Kumsa (born c. 1955), Canadian feminist and professor
- Martha Kwataine, Malawian health- and human rights activist
- Martha Kyrle (1917–2017), Austrian physician and philanthropist
- Martha L. Addis (1878–1942), American jeweler, businesswoman, and clubwoman
- Martha L. Campbell (born 1949), American retired ambassador and diplomat
- Martha L. Ludwig (1931–2006), American biochemist, crystallographer, and professor
- Martha L. Moore-Keish, American Presbyterian theologian
- Martha Ladly, Canadian academic, designer, musician, professor, and past member of the bands Martha and the Muffins and The Associates (band)
- Martha Laguette (born 1951), Mexican lawyer and politician
- Martha Lane Fox (born 1973), British businesswoman, philanthropist, and public servant
- Martha Langbein (born 1941), West German former sprinter
- Martha Langford, Canadian art historian
- Martha Laning (born 1962/1963), American businesswoman, activist, and politician
- Martha Lara, Mexican diplomat and politician
- Martha Larsen Jahn (1875–1954), Norwegian peace and women's activist
- Martha Laurens Ramsay (1759–1811), American memoirist and sister of John Laurens
- Martha Laurijsen (born 1954), Dutch former rowing cox
- Martha Lauzen, American academic and researcher
- Martha Lawley, American politician
- Martha Leeb Hadzi (1919–2003), American art historian and archeologist
- Martha Lee Walters (born 1950), American labor attorney and former judge
- Martha Leijonhufvud (1520–1584), Swedish noblewoman
- Märtha Leth (1877–1953), Swedish pharmacist
- Martha Leticia Rivera Cisneros (born 1965), Mexican politician
- Martha Leticia Sosa Govea (born 1950), Mexican politician
- Martha Levisman (1933–2022), Argentine architect, archivist, and historian
- Martha Lewis, several people
- Martha Liliana Hernández Florián (born 1988), Colombian Paralympic athlete
- Martha Lipton (1913–2006), American operatic mezzo-soprano
- Martha Lloyd (principal) (1860–1943), English school principal
- Martha Llwyd (1766–1845), Welsh poet and Methodist hymnwriter
- Martha Loane (1852–1933), English nurse and social commentator
- Martha Locke Hazen (1931–2006), American astronomer
- Martha Loftin Wilson (1834–1919), American missionary worker, journal editor, and American Civil War heroine
- Martha Long (born 1950s), Irish author
- Martha Longenecker (1920–2013), American artist, art educator- and collector, and museum director
- Martha Lopez (born 1968), Colombian road cyclist
- Martha Lorber (1900–1983), American dancer, actress, singer, model, and Ziegfeld Girl
- Martha Lou Gadsden (1930–2021), American chef and restaurateur
- Martha Louisa Cocke (1855–1938), American educator
- Martha Louise Morrow Foxx (1902–1985), American educator
- Martha Louise Rayne (1836–1911), American journalist and writer
- Martha Louise White (c. 1926–2002), birth name of Linda Taylor, American criminal
- Martha Lucas Pate (1912–1983), American administrator, educator, and philanthropist
- Martha Lucía Mícher (born 1954), Mexican politician
- Martha Lucía Ospina Martínez, Colombian epidemiologist and doctor
- Martha Lucía Zamora (born 1960), Colombian lawyer and politician
- Martha Luna, Venezuelan fashion designer, stylist, and television host
- Martha Lund Olsen (born 1961), Greenlandic politician
- Martha Lux-Steiner (born 1950), Swiss physicist
- Martha M. Gardner, American statistician
- Martha M. Pacold (born 1979), American district judge
- Martha M. Place (1849–1899), American executed murderer
- Martha M. Russell (1867–1961), American nurse in World War I
- Martha M. Simpson (1865–1948), Irish-born Australian educational theorist and poet
- Martha M. Vertreace-Doody (born 1945), American poet, short story author, and professor of English
- Martha M. Walz (born 1961), American former politician
- Martha MacCallum (born 1964), American journalist and news anchor
- Martha MacDonald (disambiguation), several people
- Martha MacGuffie (1924–2011), American reconstructive- and plastic surgeon
- Martha Macintyre (born 1945), Australian anthropologist and historian
- Martha MacIsaac (born 1984), Canadian actress
- Martha Mackintosh (born 1992), English actress
- Martha Madison (born 1977), American actress
- Martha Madrigal (1929–2021), Mexican poet and storyteller
- Martha Magee (c. 1755–1846), Irish Presbyterian and philanthropist
- Martha Manning Laurens (1757–1781), American wife of John Laurens
- Martha Mansfield (1899–1923), American actress
- Martha Manzano (born 1953), Colombian diver
- Martha Marek (1897–1938), Australian serial killer
- Martha Mariana Castro (born 1966), Mexican actress
- Martha Marlow, Australian singer, songwriter, artist, and musician
- Martha Márquez Alvarado (born 1984), Mexican politician
- Martha Mary O'Neill (1878–1972), Australian-Irish Roman Catholic nun
- Martha Mason (1937–2009), American writer
- Martha Masters, several people
- Martha Mataele (born 1999), New Zealand rugby union player
- Martha Matilda Harper (1857–1950), American businesswoman, entrepreneur, and inventor
- Martha Matoula (born 1997), Greek professional tennis player
- Martha Matsa (born 1987), Greek swimmer
- Martha Mattox (1879–1933), American silent film actress
- Martha Maxwell (1831–1881), American naturalist, artist, and taxidermist
- Martha May Eliot (1891–1978), American pediatrician and specialist in public health
- Martha Mayer Erlebacher (1937–2013), American painter
- Martha McBride Knight (1805–1901), American founding member of the Relief Society, and a wife of Joseph Smith
- Martha McCabe (born 1989), Canadian competition swimmer
- Martha McCarthy, Canadian lawyer
- Martha McCaughey (born 1966), American academic and author
- Martha McClintock (born 1947), American psychologist
- Martha McDonald (born 1964), American artist
- Martha McMillan Roberts (1919–1992), American photographer
- Martha McPhee (born 1965), American novelist
- Martha McSally (born 1966), American politician and former military pilot
- Martha McTier (1742/1743-1837), Irish school teacher, hospital visitor, and advocate
- Martha McWhirter (1827–1904), American religious leader and advocate for women
- Martha Mears (1910–1986), American radio and film contralto singer
- Martha Mears (author), 18th century British midwife and author
- Martha Medeiros (born 1961), Brazilian writer and journalist
- Martha Mednick (1929–2020), American feminist psychologist and professor
- Martha Meir Allen (1854–1926), Canadian temperance activist and writer
- Martha Menchaca, Mexican-American academic
- Martha Mendoza (born 1966), American journalist
- Martha Mercader (1926–2010), Argentine politician and writer
- Martha Merington (1831–1912), English politician
- Martha Merrow (born 1957), American chronobiologist
- Martha Mier (born 1936), American composer and retired independent piano teacher
- Martha Mijares (1938–2018), Mexican film actress
- Martha Minerva Franklin (1870–1968), American nurse and activist
- Martha Minow (born 1954), American legal scholar and professor
- Martha Mitchell (disambiguation), several people
- Martha Mmola (?-2020), South African politician
- Martha Mödl (1912–2001), German soprano
- Martha Montaner (1955–2016), Uruguayan politician
- Martha Montoya, Colombian-American cartoonist and businesswoman
- Martha Moody (born 1955), American author
- Martha Moore (footballer) (born 1981), American-born Mexican retired international footballer
- Martha Mori (born 1979), Peruvian former footballer
- Martha Morrison (1956–1974), American murder victim
- Martha Morton (1865–1925), American playwright
- Martha Mosse (1884–1977), German lawyer
- Martha Mott Kelly (1906–2005), pen name of Patrick Quentin, American mystery writer
- Martha Moulsworth (1577-c. 1646), English writer
- Martha Moxley (1960–1975), American murder victim
- Martha Moyano (born 1964), Peruvian nurse and politician
- Martha Mugler (born 1961), American politician
- Martha Munizzi (born 1968), American Christian music singer, songwriter, author, and pastor
- Martha Mvungi (1943–2017), Tanzanian novelist, short-story writer, academic, and teacher
- Martha Myers (1925–2022), American dance educator
- Martha'r Mynydd (fl. c. 1770), Welsh woman who convinced neighbours of the existence of invisible people
- Martha N. Brookings (1881–?), American politician
- Martha N. Hill (born 1943), American nurse
- Martha Namundjebo, several people
- Martha Naset (1947–1994), American pianist
- Martha Nasibù (1931–2019), Ethiopian writer, poet, and artist
- Martha Nause (born 1954), American LPGA Tour player
- Martha Needle (1863–1894), Australian serial killer
- Martha Nelson, several people
- Martha Nelumbu (born 1930), Namibian chief
- Martha Nessler Hayden (born 1936), American artist
- Martha Neumark (1904–1981), American Jewish rabbi
- Martha Ngano, Rhodesian independence activist
- Martha Nichols (born 1987), American choreographer and dancer
- Martha Nierenberg (1924–2020), Hungarian-born American businesswoman
- Martha Niquille (born 1954), Swiss jurist and judge
- Martha Nix Wade (born 1967), American actress, author, and speaker
- Martha Norelius (1909–1955), Swedish-born American competition swimmer
- Martha Nothmann (1874–1967), German Jewish art collector
- Martha Nussbaum (born 1947), American philosopher and professor of law and ethics
- Martha O'Driscoll (1922–1998), American film actress
- Martha Olckers (born 1941), South African retired politician
- Martha Oliver, several people
- Martha Olney (born 1956), American professor of economics
- Martha Ontaneda, Ecuadorian actress, producer, and director
- Martha Ormaza (1959–2018), Ecuadorian actress, writer, and director
- Martha Ortiz, Mexican chef and restaurant owner
- Martha Osamor, Baroness Osamor (born 1940), British-Nigerian politician, life peer, community activist, and civil rights campaigner
- Martha Ostenso (1900–1963), Norwegian-American novelist and screenwriter
- Martha P. Cotera (born 1938), Mexican librarian, nationalist, feminist, and writer
- Martha P. Falconer (1862–1941), American pioneer social reformer
- Martha P. Haynes (born 1951), American astronomer and professor
- Martha Palafox Gutiérrez (1949–2022), Mexican politician
- Martha Palmer, American computer scientist
- Martha Parmelee Rose (1834–1923), American journalist, social reformer, social leader, and philanthropist
- Martha Parsons (1869–1965), American businesswoman
- Martha Patricia Ramírez Lucero (1952–2021), Mexican lawyer and politician
- Martha Peckard (1729–1805), British poet
- Martha Peralta Epieyú, Colombian lawyer, specialist in environmental law, and politician
- Martha Perry Lowe (1829–1902), American poet, social activist, and organizer
- Martha Peterson (born 1945), American former CIA officer
- Martha Peterson (academic administrator) (1916–2006), American academic administrator
- Martha Piper (born 1945), Canadian academic administrator
- Martha Plimpton (born 1970), American actress, activist, and former model
- Martha Poe, American woman who owned the Martha Poe Dogtrot House
- Martha Poland Thurston (1849–1898), 19th century American social leader, philanthropist, and writer
- Martha Poma (born 1964), Bolivian politician, trade unionist, and textile artisan
- Martha Prescod Norman Noonan (born 1945), American civil rights activist
- Martha Priscilla Shaw (1904–1981), American educator and politician
- Martha Qorro, Tanzanian schoolteacher, writer, and linguist
- Martha Quinn (born 1959), American actress and radio- and television personality
- Martha R. Field (1854–1898), American journalist
- Martha Raddatz (born 1953), American TV reporter
- Martha Rainville (born 1958), American retired air force officer
- Martha Ramirez-Oropeza (born 1952), Mexican-born American muralist, painter, theater performer, and researcher
- Martha Randall (born 1948), American former competition swimmer
- Martha Ratliff (born 1946), American linguist and professor emerita
- Martha Ray (1746–1779), British singer of the Georgian era
- Martha Raye (1916–1994), American comic actress and singer
- Martha Reben (1906–1964), American writer
- Martha Redbone (born 1966), American blues and soul singer
- Martha Reeves (born 1941), American R&B and pop singer
- Martha Reeves (anchorite) (born 1941), American writer and ascetic
- Martha Remmert (1853–1941), German classical pianist, music educator, conductor, and music writer
- Martha Rendell (1871–1909), Australian executed murderer
- Martha Revuelta (born 1986), Mexican beach volleyball- and volleyball player
- Martha Reyes, Nicaraguan politician
- Martha Rhoads Bell (1941–1991), American archaeologist
- Martha Rhodes, American poet, teacher, and publisher
- Martha Rial (born 1961), American independent photographer
- Martha Ribi (1915–2010), Swiss politician
- Martha Richler (born 1964), English cartoonist and radio presenter
- Martha Ripley (1843–1912), American physician, suffragist, and professor of medicine
- Martha Rivera-Garrido (born 1961), Dominican Republic writer and poet
- Martha Rivers Ingram (born 1935), American businesswoman and philanthropist
- Martha Robertson, American candidate in the 2014 United States House of Representatives elections in New York
- Martha Roby (born 1976), American lawyer and politician
- Martha Rocha (1932–2020), Brazilian model and beauty pageant titleholder
- Martha Rockwell (born 1944), American retired cross-country skier and coach
- Martha Rofheart (1917–1990), American writer of historical novels, actress, and model
- Martha Rogers, several people
- Martha Rojas Urrego, Colombian-French biologist, ecologist, and humanitarian-, gender-, and environmental advocate
- Martha Roldós (born 1963), Ecuadorian economist and politician
- Martha Rommelaere (1922–2011), Canadian AAGPBL player
- Martha Ronk (born 1940), American poet
- Martha Root (1872–1939), American teacher of the Bahá'í Faith
- Martha Rose Shulman, American cookbook author, cooking teacher, and food columnist
- Martha Rosler (born 1943), American artist
- Martha Ross (1939–2019), British actress and radio presenter
- Martha Roth (1932–2016), Italian-born Mexican film actress
- Martha Rountree (1911–1999), American pioneering broadcast journalist and entrepreneur
- Martha Routh (1743–1817), British Quaker minister and writer
- Martha Ruben-Wolf (1887–1939), German physician, travel writer, political- and feminist activist, and family planning pioneer
- Martha Ruech, Austrian luger
- Martha Ruggles Bernhard Updike (1937–2023), American social worker and widow of author John Updike
- Martha S. Feldman, American organization theorist and professor
- Martha S. Hearron (1943–2014), American biostatistician
- Martha S. Jones, American historian, legal scholar, writer, and professor
- Martha S. Linet, American physician, epidemiologist, and scientist emerita
- Martha S. Pope (born 1945/1946), American public servant
- Martha Salazar (born 1970), Mexican retired boxer
- Martha Salcudean (1934–2019), Romanian-born Canadian physicist and Holocaust survivor
- Martha Salotti (1899–1980), Argentine educator and writer
- Martha Samuelson, American chief executive
- Martha Sandolo Belleh, Liberian former politician
- Martha Sarah Kahui Bragg (1895–1975), New Zealand dairy farmer and child welfare worker
- Martha Savage, New Zealand geology academic and professor
- Martha Savory Yeardley (1781–1851), English poet, Quaker minister, missionary, and author
- Martha Saxton (1945–2023), American professor of history and women's- and gender studies
- Martha Scanlan, American old-time singer-songwriter
- Martha Scanlan Klima (born 1938), American politician
- Martha Schlag (1875–1956), German politician
- Martha Schlamme (1923–1985), Austrian-born American singer and actress
- Martha Schneider-Bürger (1903–2001), German civil engineer
- Martha Schofield (1839–1916), American Hicksite Quaker abolitionist and suffragist
- Martha Schrader (born 1953), American politician and educator
- Martha Schrøder (1918–2009), Norwegian politician
- Martha Schwartz (born 1950), American landscape architect and educator
- Martha Schwendener, American past member of post-rock band Bowery Electric
- Martha Scott (1912–2003), American actress
- Martha Sears, American wife of William Sears (physician)
- Martha Seim Valeur (1923–2016), Norwegian politician
- Martha Serpas (born 1965), American poet and educator
- Martha Settle Putney (1916–2008), American educator and historian
- Martha Sharp (1905–1999), American Unitarian social worker and humanitarian
- Martha Sharp Joukowsky (1936–2022), American archaeologist of the Near East, writer, and academic
- Martha Sheil, American operatic soprano, voice teacher, and academic
- Martha Sheldon (1860–1912), American medical missionary in India, Nepal, and Tibet
- Martha Shelley (born 1943), American activist, writer, and poet
- Martha Sherman, English wife of James Sherman (minister)
- Martha Sherrill, American journalist, non-fiction writer, and novelist
- Martha Shoffner (born 1944/1945), American former politician
- Martha Siegel, American applied mathematician, probability theorist, and mathematics educator
- Laurence Canter and Martha Siegel (born 1948), American lawyer and Internet spammer
- Martha Sigall (1917–2014), American inker and painter
- Martha Silva (born 1992), Nicaraguan footballer
- Martha Simkins (1866–1969), American painter
- Martha Simmonds (c. 1624–1665), English Quaker and author
- Martha Sleeper (1910–1983), American film actress
- Martha Smith (disambiguation), several people
- Martha Snowden, 19th century American member of the Snowden Family Band
- Martha Somerman (born 1947), American researcher and educator in medicine
- Martha Sonntag Bradley-Evans (born 1951), American academic and professor
- Martha Soukup (born 1959), American science fiction author and playwright
- Martha Southgate (born 1960), American novelist and essayist
- Martha Sprackland (born 1988), British writer
- Martha Spurrier (born 1986), British barrister and human rights campaigner
- Martha Stahr Carpenter (1920–2013), American astronomer and academic
- Martha Stark, American politician
- Martha Stearns Marshall (1726–1771), American Separate Baptist preacher
- Martha Steffy Browne (1898–1990), Austrian American economist
- Martha Stephens (born 1984), American film writer and director
- Martha Stettler (1870–1945), Swiss painter and engraver
- Martha Stevens, American politician
- Martha Stewart (born 1941), American retail businesswoman, writer, and television personality
- Martha Stewart (actress) (1922–2021), American actress
- Martha Stewart Leitch (1918–2015), Canadian architect
- Martha Stone Hubbell (1814–1856), American author
- Martha Stout (born 1953), American psychologist and author
- Martha Strongin Katz (born 1943), American violist
- Martha Sturdy (born 1942), Canadian artist and designer
- Martha Summerhayes (1844–1926), American memoirist
- Martha "Sunny" von Bülow (1932–2008), American heiress and socialite
- Martha Susan Baker (1871–1911), American painter, muralist, and teacher
- Martha Swope (1928–2017), American photographer
- Martha Taboas (born 1989), American-born Puerto Rican retired footballer
- Martha Tabor (1939–2004), American educator, laborer, union organizer, photographer, and artist
- Martha Tabram (1849–1888), English sex worker and murder victim
- Martha Tagle Martínez (born 1973), Mexican politician
- Martha Takane, Mexican mathematician, professor, and researcher
- Martha Tamayo (born 1951), Mexican lawyer and politician
- Martha Tarhemba (born 1978), Nigerian footballer
- Martha Tedeschi (born 1958), American art historian and curator
- Martha Teichner (born 1948), American television news correspondent
- Martha Tembo (born 1998), Zambian footballer
- Martha Tenorio (born 1966), Ecuadorian retired long-distance runner
- Martha Thomas, several people
- Martha Thompson (1731–1820), English Methodist
- Martha Thomsen (born 1957), American model
- Martha Thorne (born 1953), American architectural academic, curator, editor, and author
- Martha Tilston (born 1975/1976), English folk singer-songwriter
- Martha Tilton (1915–2006), American singer
- Martha Tracy (1876–1942), American chemist, physician, and academic administer
- Martha Triana (1920–2011), Mexican singer
- Martha Turner (1839–1915), English-born Australian Unitarian minister
- Martha Tynæs (1870–1930), Norwegian feminist, social worker, and politician
- Molly Upton (born Martha Neill; 1953–1977), American painter, sculptor, and quilter
- Martha Urioste (1937–2022), American Montessori teacher
- Martha Valdés (1928–2014), Mexican actress
- Martha Van Coppenolle (1912–2004), Belgian artist and book illustrator
- Martha Van Rensselaer (1864–1932), American educator, school commissioner, author, and editor
- Martha van Wetteren (1646–1684), Flemish woman executed for witchcraft
- Martha Vasconcellos (born 1948), Brazilian beauty queen
- Martha Vaughan (1926–2018), American biochemist
- Martha Vázquez (born 1953), American judge
- Martha Veléz (born 1945), American actress and singer
- Martha Vicinus (born 1939), American scholar and professor of English literature and women's studies
- Martha Vickers (1925–1971), American model and actress
- Martha Villalobos (born 1962), Mexican former professional wrestler
- Martha Violet Ball (1811–1894), American educator, philanthropist, activist, writer, and editor
- Martha, Viscountess of Marsan (1228–1283), French vicomtess
- Martha Visser't Hooft (1906–1994), American painter and teacher
- Martha Vital (born 1963), Mexican politician
- Martha von Bülow (1932–2008), American heiress and socialite
- Martha Vonk-van Kalker (1943–2022), Dutch politician
- Martha von Sabinin (1831–1892), Russian composer and pianist
- Martha Voß-Zietz (1871–1961), German conservative and women's rights activist
- Martha W. Alibali, American cognitive scientist and educational psychologist
- Martha W. Bark (1928–2015), American politician
- Martha W. McCartney, American research historian and writer
- Martha Wadsworth Brewster (1710-c. 1757), 18th century American poet and writer
- Martha Wærn (1741–1812), Norwegian-Danish philanthropist
- Martha Wainwright (born 1976), Canadian-American folk-rock singer-songwriter and musician
- Martha Waldron Janes (1832–1913), American minister, social reformer, and columnist
- Martha Walker Freer (1822–1888), English writer of French history
- Martha Wall (1910–2000), American Christian medical missionary, philosopher, nurse, and author
- Martha Wallner (1927–2018), Austrian stage actress
- Martha Walter (1875–1976), American impressionist painter
- Martha Wardrop (born 1969), Scottish politician
- Martha Ware (1917–2009), American district court judge
- Martha Warren Beckwith (1871–1959), American folklorist and ethnographer
- Martha Wash (born 1953), American singer-songwriter, actress, and producer
- Martha Washington (1731–1802), American wife of U.S. president George Washington
- Martha Watson (born 1946), American retired track and field athlete
- Martha Watts (1848–1909), American missionary and school teacher
- Martha Wells (born 1964), American writer of speculative fiction
- Martha Wentworth (1889–1974), American actress
- Martha Wertheimer (1890–1942), German journalist, writer, rescuer of Jews, and Holocaust victim
- Martha West (born 1946), American attorney, legal scholar, and professor emerita
- Martha Whitehead, American politician
- Martha Whitmore Hickman (1925–2015), American author
- Martha Wiebe Owen, Canadian candidate in the New Democratic Party candidates in the 1997 Canadian federal election
- Martha Wilkerson (1918–1999), birth name of GI Jill, American disc jockey
- Martha Wilkinson (1941–2014), American businesswoman and politician
- Martha Williams (lawyer), American attorney and government official
- Martha Williamson (born 1955), American television producer and writer
- Martha Wilmot (1775–1873), Irish traveler and diarist
- Martha Wilson (born 1947), American feminist performance artist and arts administrator
- Martha Winch (born 1978), Australian former cricketer
- Martha Wintermute (1842–1918), American author and poet
- Martha Wise (1883–1971), American serial killer
- Martha Wolfenstein (1869–1906), Prussian-born American author
- Martha Wollstein (1868–1939), American physician
- Martha Wong (born 1939), American politician
- Martha Woodmansee (born 1944), American professor
- Martha Worst (1911–1981), American javelin thrower
- Martha Wray (1739–1788), English businesswoman
- Martha Wright, several people
- Martha Young, several people
- Martha Yujra (born 1964), Bolivian politician and trade unionist
- Martha Zeiger, American endocrine surgeon and scientist
- Martha Zeller (1918–2014), Mexican singer
- Martha Zelt (1930–2023), American printmaker
- Martha Ziegler (1899–1957), German actress
- Martha Zoller (born 1959), American columnist, media personality, author, and former politician
- Martha Zweig (born 1942), American poet

=== Fictional characters ===
- Martha, in the animated series Helluva Boss, voiced by Jinkx Monsoon
- Martha Boyd, in the US TV series Homeland, played by Laila Robins
- Martha Bozeman, in the US fantasy horror drama TV series True Blood, played by Dale Dickey
- Martha Bronson, in the US TV sitcom Leave It to Beaver, played by Madge Kennedy, Barbara Billingsley, and June Cleaver
- Martha Carter, in the UK radio soap opera The Archers
- Martha Connors, in Marvel Comics
- Martha Costello, in the UK TV drama series Silk, played by Maxine Peake
- Countess Martha Dracula, the deceased wife of Count Dracula and late mother of Mavis from the Hotel Transylvania franchise, voiced by Jackie Sandler
- Martha Cox, in the US franchise High School Musical, played by Kaycee Stroh
- Martha Day, in the US animated series These Are the Days, played by June Lockhart]
- Martha Foster, several characters
- Martha Fraser, in the UK TV soap opera Coronation Street, played by Stephanie Beacham
- Martha Hanson, in the US period spy drama TV series The Americans, played by Alison Wright
- Martha Huber, in the US comedy-drama series Desperate Housewives, played by Christine Estabrook
- Martha Jones, in the UK BBC series Doctor Who, played by Freema Agyeman
- Martha Kane, in the UK soap opera Hollyoaks, played by Carli Norris
- Martha Kaply, in the US franchise Jumanji, played by Morgan Turner
- Martha Kent, adoptive mother of Clark Kent (Superman) from DC Comics
- Martha Logan, in the US action drama TV series 24, played by Jean Smart
- Martha Longhurst, in the UK TV soap opera Coronation Street, played by Lynne Carol
- Martha MacDonald, in the UK TV drama series Monarch of the Glen
- Martha MacKenzie, in the Australian TV soap opera Home and Away, played by Burcin Kapkin and Jodi Gordon
- Martha Marceau, in the US TV soap opera The Edge of Night, played by Teri Keane
- Martha Masters, in the US medical drama TV series House, played by Amber Tamblyn
- Martha "Mattie" Franklin, the third Spider-Woman in Marvel Comics
- Martha McKee, in the US soap opera Ryan's Hope, played by Tovah Feldshuh
- Martha Prince, in the US animated TV series The Simpsons, voiced by Jo Ann Harris and Russi Taylor
- Martha Quimby, in the US animated TV series The Simpsons, voiced by Maggie Roswell
- Martha Riley, in the New Zealand soap opera Shortland Street, played by Jacque Drew
- Martha Rodgers, in the US crime mystery/comedy-drama TV series Castle, played by Susan Sullivan
- Martha Rose, in the UK medical soap opera Doctors, played by Lillian Hardy
- Martha Stewart, in the Australian TV soap opera Home and Away, played by Alison Mulvaney and Belinda Giblin
- Martha Wayne, mother of Bruce Wayne (Batman) from DC Comics
