= Marthe (given name) =

Marthe is a feminine given name. Notable people with the name include:

- Marthe Armitage, British wallpaper designer
- Marthe Bibesco (1886–1973), Romanian-French writer and socialite
- Marthe Bigot (1878–1962), French schoolteacher and activist
- Marthe Boyer-Breton (1879–1926), French artist
- Marthe Bretelle (1936–1995), French athlete
- Marthe Solange Achy Brou, Ivorian politician
- Marthe Chenal (1881–1947), French opera singer
- Marthe Cohn (1920–2025), French resistance member and writer
- Marthe Condat (1886–1939), French physician
- Marthe Cnockaert (1892–1966), Belgian spy and writer
- Marthe Cosnard, 17th-century French playwright
- Marthe de Kerchove de Denterghem (1877–1956), Belgian feminist
- Marthe Distel, French journalist
- Marthe Djian (born 1936), French athlete
- Marthe Donas (1885–1967), Belgian artist
- Marthe Dupont (1892–1979), Belgian tennis player
- Marthe Duvivier, 19th-century French opera singer
- Marthe Enger Eide (born 1989), Norwegian sailor
- Marthe Ekemeyong Moumié (1931–2009), Cameroonian writer and activist
- Marthe Emmanuel (1901–1997), French geographer, historian
- Marthe Flandrin (1904–1987), French artist
- Marthe de Florian (1864–1939), French courtesan
- Marthe Gautier (1925–2022), French pediatrician
- Marthe Gosteli (1917–2017), Swiss suffragist and archivist
- Marthe Hanau (1890–1935), French fraudster
- Marthe Jocelyn (born 1956), Canadian writer
- Marthe Keller (born 1945), Swiss actress and opera director
- Marthe Koala (born 1994), Burkinabé athlete
- Marthe Kristoffersen (born 1989), Norwegian cross-country skier
- Marthe Létourneau (1916–1998), Canadian soprano and teacher
- Marthe Mellot (1870–1947), French actress
- Marthe Mercadier (1928–2021), French actress
- Marthe Munsterman (born 1993), Dutch women's footballer
- Marthe Katrine Myhre (1985–2024), Norwegian triathlete and cross-country skier
- Marthe Niel (1878–1928), French aviator
- Marthe Rakine (1904–1996), Canadian painter
- Marthe Renard, née Leblanc (b. 1903), French pharmacist who worked in Marie Curie's laboratory on the separation of plutonium
- Marthe Richard (1889–1982), French prostitute, spy and politician
- Marthe Robert (1914–1996), French writer and translator
- Marthe Robin (1902–1981), French Roman Catholic mystic and stigmatist
- Marthe de Roucoulle (1659–1741), French Huguenot educator and salon holder
- Marthe Servine (died 1972), French-American classical composer and pianist
- Marthe Valle (born 1982), Norwegian singer-songwriter
- Marthe Villalonga (born 1932), French actress
- Marthe Vinot (1894–1974), French actress
- Marthe Voegeli, Swiss physician
- Marthe Vogt (1903–2003), German neuroscientist
- Marthe Weiss née Klein (1885–1953), French scientist and teacher, worked with Marie Curie
- Marthe Wéry (1930–2005), Belgian painter
- Marthe Yankurije (born 1994), Rwandan long-distance runner

== See also ==
- Martha (given name)
