= Martha Cecilia Ruiz =

Nicaraguan poet, writer, journalist, and social activist (born 1972)

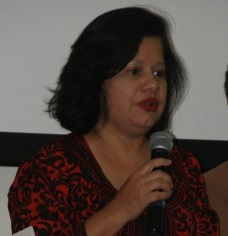
- Martha Cecilia Ruiz, 8 March 2016
- Born: 25 November 1972 (age 53); Managua
- Education: Central American University of Managua
- Occupations: Poet, writer, journalist, and activist
- Website: marthaceciliaruiz.com

Martha Cecilia Ruíz (born 25 November 1972) is a Nicaraguan poet, writer, journalist, and Social activist. She directs the El País Azul radio talk show, sits on the board of directors of Nicaraguan Association of Writers (ANIDE) as a member (2015–2018), is a consultant in Communication and Human Rights, and has founded both Three Times Three (Three Women, Three Poets, Three Journalists) and the Forum of Cultural Journalists of Nicaragua (FPCN). Ruiz's writings have been included in numerous anthologies and she has published a single narrative book as of November 2017.

== Biography ==
Ruiz was born in Managua, and holds degrees in journalism, Communication, Child Rights, Gender and Human Development, all from the Central American University of Managua.

In the early 2000s, Ruiz founded the group Three Times Three: Three Women, Three Poets, Three Journalists with Esther Picado and Vilma Duarte. She also founded the Forum of Cultural Journalists of Nicaragua and the Network of Communicators to broach the topic of HIV and AIDS in Nicaragua.

=== Radio ===
Ruiz hosts the El País Azul talk show broadcast on Radio La Primerísima every Sunday from 7 to 8 am CST.

== Bibliography ==
=== Book ===
In 2016, Ruiz published her first narrative book Familia de Cuchillos.

- Ruiz, Martha Cecilia (5 August 2016). Familia de Cuchillos [Family of Knives] (in Spanish). Managua, Nicaragua: ANIDE. ISBN 1536853283.

=== Anthologies ===
The writings of Martha Cecilia Ruíz have been included in many anthologies, all listed below.

- Antología Mujeres Poetas en el País de las Nubes. Mizteca Culture Studies Center. Mexico, 2008
- De Azul a Rojo. Voces de poetas nicaragüenses del Siglo XXI. Managua, 2011.
- Nosotras también contamos. Muestra de Narrativa. ANIDE. Managua, 2013
- Esta palabra es nuestra. ANIDE. Managua, 2014
- Hermanas de tinta. Muestra de poesía multiétnica de mujeres nicaragüenses. ANIDE. Managua, 2014
- Antología Cuentos nicaragüense de ayer y hoy. Lacayo, Chamorro César y Valle-Castillo. USA, 2014
- 99 Palabras de Mujer. Microrrelatos y otras especies. Marianela Corriols editora. Managua, 2016
