= Martha Collins =

Martha Collins may refer to:

- Martha Collins (poet) (born 1940), American poet, translator, and editor
- Martha Layne Collins (1936–2025), American politician
