= Martha Cohen =

Canadian activist and philanthropist (1920–2015)

Martha Ruth Cohen
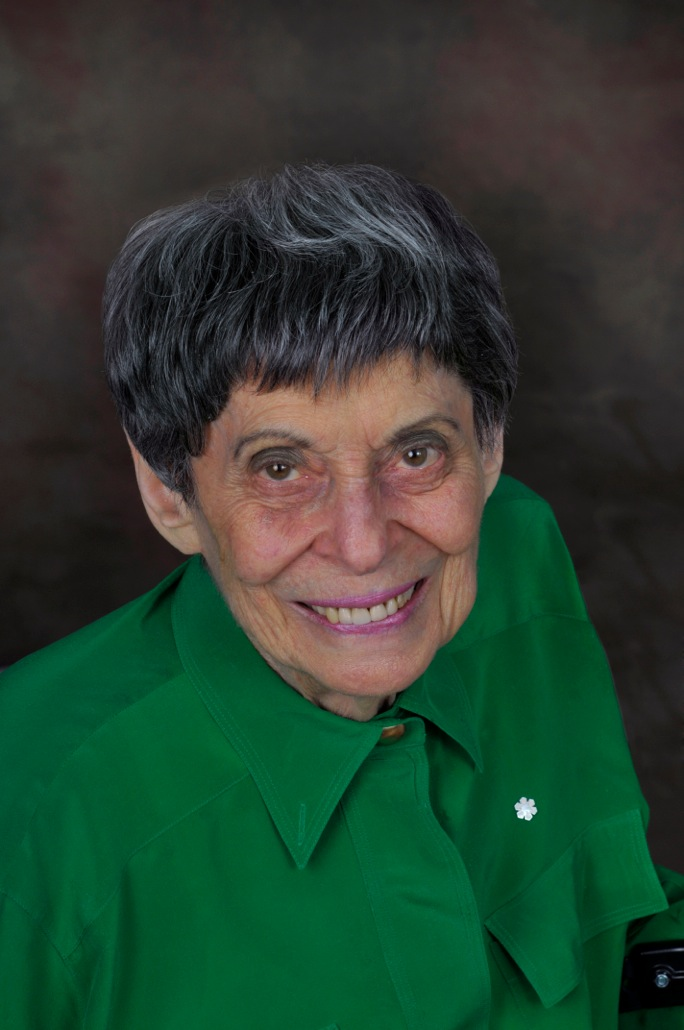
- Born: Martha Ruth Block; 1920; Calgary, Alberta
- Died: February 26, 2015 (94-95 years old)
- Known for: Philanthropy and activism

Martha Ruth Cohen, CM, LLD (née Block; 1920 – February 26, 2015) was a Canadian community activist and philanthropist. She spearheaded a variety of major civic projects, including construction of the $45 million Calgary Centre for the Performing Arts. As chairwoman of the board of directors at Mount Royal College, she oversaw the construction of a new campus and was the first woman to head a higher educational institution in Alberta. She was a member of the Order of Canada and received an honorary doctorate from the University of Calgary in 1982.

== Life and education ==
Cohen was born in 1920 in Calgary, Alberta to parents Rebecca and Peter Block.

She received a Bachelor of Arts from the University of Alberta in 1940, and a Master Diploma of Social Work from the University of Toronto in 1945. Cohen has four children. In 1982, she received an honorary doctorate from the University of Calgary and in 1995 received an Honorary Bachelor of Applied Communications from Mount Royal College.

Cohen died on February 26, 2015. Her 30-piece art collection made headlines when it was auctioned off.

== Achievements ==
- Chairwoman of the Board for the Calgary Centre for the Performing Arts during creation of the centre.
- Chairwoman of the Mount Royal College Board of Governors during the construction of a new campus, becoming the first woman to head a higher educational institution in Alberta.
- Founder/Past Executive Director of the Jewish Family Service in Calgary.
- President of the National Council of Jewish Women of Canada
- Councillor, Alberta Order of Excellence (1980–1985)

== Philanthropy ==
The Harry & Martha Cohen Foundation is a private family foundation which provides grants primarily to Calgary-based charities. She founded it with her husband Harry B. Cohen (1912–1990), who was also a philanthropist.

Cohen and five other women primarily were the ones to fundraise $45 million to build the Calgary Centre for the Performing Arts.

In 1983, Cohen's husband Harry donated $1 million to have a theatre named at the Calgary Centre for the Performing Arts in honor of Martha Cohen's birthday.

After her death on February 26, 2015, the Dr. Martha Cohen School was named in her honour. On May 4, 2015, the Calgary Board of Education (CBE) announced that it would name a new Middle School (located in New Brighton/Copperfield) after Martha Cohen and described her as one of the city's foremost humanitarians and philanthropists. In April, 2017, the CBE formally opened the Dr. Martha Cohen School at 1750 New Brighton Drive S.E. It will provide educational programming for approximately 900 students (Grades 5–9).

== Honorary degrees ==
- Honorary doctorate, University of Calgary (1982)
- Honorary Bachelor of Applied Communications, Mount Royal College (1995)

== Awards ==
- Prime Minister Medal, State of Israel Bonds (1970)
- Order of Canada (1975)
- Queen Elizabeth II Silver Jubilee Medal (1977)
- Calgary Citizen of the Year (1979)
- Boy Scouts of Canada Medal (1984)
- Variety Club International Lifeliner Medal (1984)
- City of Calgary, Centennial Award of Merit (1985)
- Scopus Award, Canadian Friends of the Hebrew University of Jerusalem (1994)
- Distinguished Citizen Award, Mount Royal College (1995)
- Angel Award, International Society for the Performing Arts (ISPA), New York (1995)
- Great Minds Banner, 175th Anniversary, University of Toronto (2002)
- Alberta Centennial Medal (2005)
- Distinguished Alumni Award, Calgary Board of Education (2006)
- Best of Alberta Award, Calgary Herald (2008)
- Global News Woman of Vision (2009)
- Western Legacy Award, 100 Outstanding Albertans, Calgary Stampede (2012)

== Sources ==
- Lumley, Elizabeth (2003). Canadian Who's Who, 2003. University of Toronto Press. ISBN 9780802088659.
- "The Best of Alberta, Calgary Herald, 2008".
- "Global Woman of Vision, Global News, 2009".
- "Alberta 150: The Wrestlers, The Team Builder, and The Professor, Calgary Herald, 2017".
