= Martha Zeller =

Background information
- Also known as: Marta Zeller "La Novia de la Radio" (The Sweetheart of Radio)
- Born: 14 March 1918; Pachuca, Hidalgo, Mexico
- Died: 6 September 2014 (aged 96) Veracruz, Veracruz, Mexico
- Genres: Bolero
- Occupation: Singer
- Instrument: Vocals

Martha Zeller (14 March 1918 – 6 September 2014) was a Mexican singer who was known as "La Novia de la Radio" (The Sweetheart of Radio) for her beauty, voice, and success on Mexican radio.

Born in Pachuca, the capital of Hidalgo, Zeller began her career after she won an amateur contest (sponsored by the Mexico City radio station XEW) with her performance of the bolero "Perfidia". She became an exclusive artist of radio station XEW and later performed at the famous Mexico City nightclub El Patio.

She recorded 35 singles, 3 LP records, and 2 extended plays, and toured United States, Cuba, Puerto Rico, Venezuela, Panama, and Brazil. She also participated in Mexican films such as Una mujer con pasado (1949) and Vagabunda (1950).

On 31 July 2013, the culture institute of Veracruz (Instituto Veracruzano de la Cultura) paid tribute to her at the Agustín Lara house museum in Boca del Río, Veracruz.

On 16 October 2013, the state government and city council of Veracruz awarded her the Toña la Negra Medal for her 80-year career and her cultural contribution to Mexico and the world.

On 11 November 2013, Mexico's national sound library (Fonoteca Nacional) paid tribute to her at the Agustín Lara house museum.

She died on 6 September 2014 in Veracruz.
