= Martha Montoya =

American cartoonist

- Known for: Cartoonist and businessperson
- Notable work: Los Kitos

Martha Montoya is a Colombian-American cartoonist and businessperson. She is best known for her cartoon, Los Kitos.

== Early life and education ==
Montoya grew up in Bogotá, Colombia and spent many years in the children's hospital where she was being treated for a kidney problem. While in the hospital, she began drawing to amuse herself and other children. When she was 15, she used her drawing skills to help teach English at the school her parents ran. Later, she went to college where she majored in biology and chemistry.

== Career ==
At age 23, Montoya moved to Newport Beach, California, where she worked as a maid. She quickly got a new job as a high school librarian, and then later on became an international agricultural development consultant. In 1995, she licensed her characters, collectively called "Los Kitos." Her comic strip began to run in dozens of publications in 1996. By 1999, the strip was featured in 222 newspapers. The newspaper La Opinión gave her her first break. Montoya branched out into working with corporate partners, such as Bank of America who commissioned her to create a bilingual coloring book that would teach children about banking services.

Montoya licensed her characters to appear on radio, working with the Canal Continental radio network. In 1999, she was in negotiations to have Los Kitos turned into an animated show. In 2001, she partnered with Stauffer Biscuit Company to create various baked goods featuring the characters from Los Kitos. Montoya partnered with La Opinion in 2002 to help create Notikitos (News 4 Kids).

Montoya went back into agriculture in 2010, founding Los Kitos Produce and Farms in Orange, California. Montoya was appointed to the advisory board of the California Department of Food and Agriculture, with a term ending in January 2020. Montoya has also served as president of the National Association of Hispanic Publications (NAHP).

Montoya is the creator of AG tools, a software for agricultural data used by cultivators and buyers to increase production efficiency.
