= Martha Ontaneda =

Ecuadorian actress, producer, and director

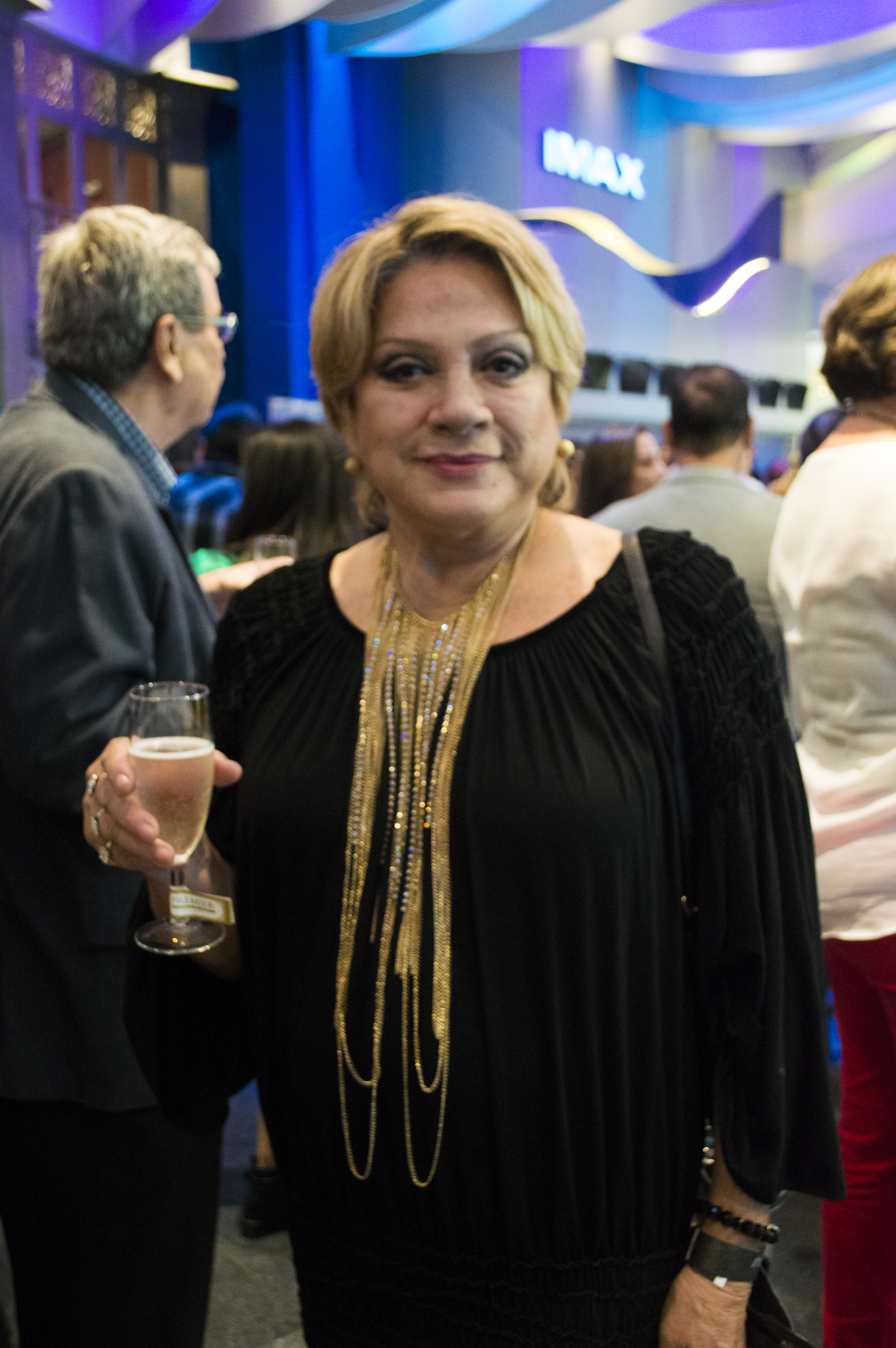
- Occupation: Actress
- Spouse: Roberto Mastalir Divisek

Martha Ontaneda Miranda is an Ecuadorian actress, producer, and director.

== Biography ==
Martha Ontaneda was born to Miguel Ángel Ontaneda and Colombia Miranda. She has three daughters, and has been married twice, currently to Roberto Mastalir.

Ontaneda entered the theatrical world in 1983 with her participation in the puppet theater group Arcoiris. She began acting in 1986 as a substitute for another actress in the play La casa de Bernarda Alba in Teatro Experimental de Guayaquil. Her first performance as a television actress was for Ecuavisa productions such as El cholito, La pareja feliz, 3 familias. In 2006, Ontaneda formed her own production company, MO Producciones Teatrales, which has since produced plays like Ocho mujeres, una ronda de arpías, an adaption of the original theatre play by Cristian Cortez.
