= Martha Bernal =

Martha Bernal may refer to:

- Martha E. Bernal (1931–2001), American clinical psychologist
- Martha Patricia Bernal (born 1965), Mexican politician
