= Martha Steffy Browne =

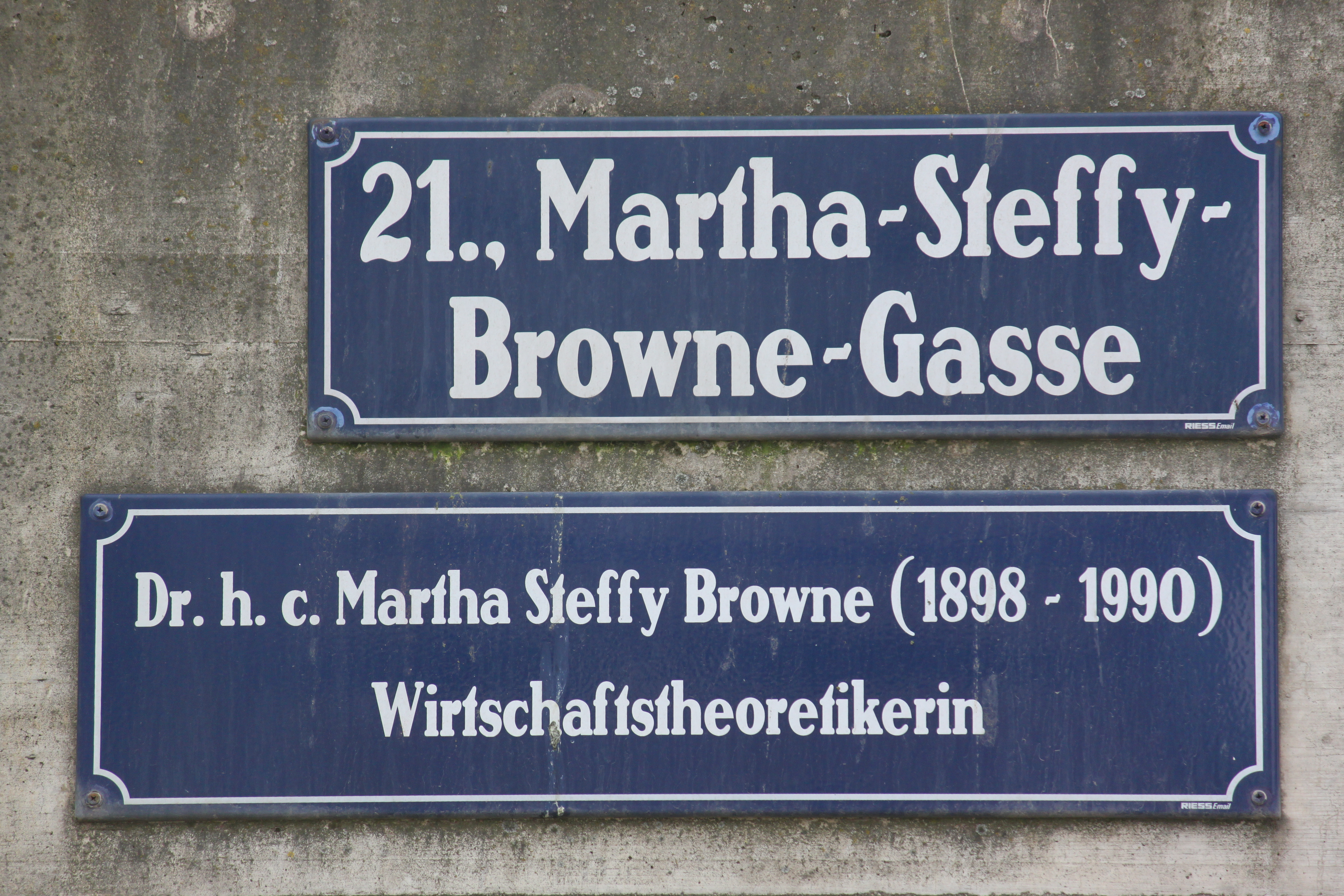
Martha-Steffy-Browne Gasse in Vienna.

Martha Steffy Browne (anglicized from Martha Stephanie Braun née Herrmann; 12 December 1898 – 2 March 1990) was an Austrian American economist. A student of Ludwig von Mises, she earned a doctorate in political economy in 1921 from the University of Vienna, one of the first women to do so. Of Jewish descent, Browne emigrated to the United States in 1939, later becoming a professor of economics at Brooklyn College (1947–1969).
