= Martha Delgado Peralta =

Mexican environmentalist

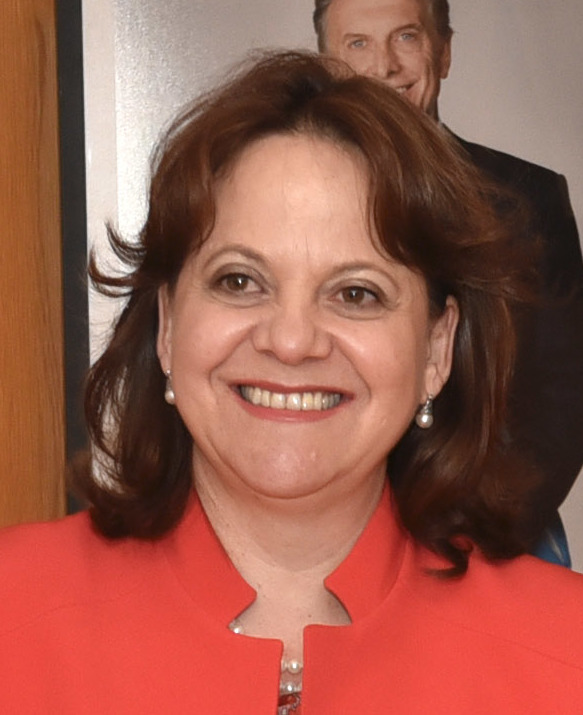

Undersecretary for Multilateral Affairs and Human rights

Personal details
- Born: 26 April 1969 (age 56)
- Party: Partido de la Revolución Democrática
- Website: http://martha.org.mx/

Martha Delgado Peralta (born 26 April 1969) is an environmentalist and the Undersecretary for Multilateral Affairs and Human Rights at the Mexican Ministry of Foreign Affairs. Delgado Peralta was elected to local congress in 2003. From 2006-2012 she served as Minister of the Environment of Mexico City. During her time as Minister of the Environment she helped to develop environmental policies including Green Plan of Mexico City, the Climate Action Program and a bike sharing program called ECOBICI.

== Publications ==
Delgado has contributed as a regular and guest columnist for the newspaper Reforma, and has published over 50 articles on environmental issues in various magazines and books. Her publications include:

- A critique of the Partido Verde Ecologista de México for its empty stance on environmental protection.
- Coordinator of Manual para el Acceso y Uso de Información sobre emisiones y transferencia de contaminantes (1999).
- Author of Educación y Democracia: Consideraciones Teóricas sobre la Educación Cívica (2000).
- Co-author of Guía Ciudadana para promover el acceso a la información ambiental y la participación social (2002).
- Coordinator of the quarterly magazine Alternativa Ciudadana 21, a national political association focused on citizenship and water governance in Mexico (2005).
- Manual para el acceso y uso de información sobre emisiones contaminantes*, coordinated by Martha Delgado Peralta, Presencia Ciudadana, Mexico City, 1999.
- Co-author of La Gota de la Vida: Hacia una Gestión Sustentable y Democrática del Agua (2006), published by the Heinrich Böll Foundation.
- Los errores de la contingencia Atmosférica(2016), published in the magazine EstePaís.
- Qué hacer para combatir la contaminación del atmosférica en la ZMVM (2016), also published in EstePaís.
- Delgado is a columnist for the digital newspaper La Silla Rota.

=== International publications ===
- Author of Chapter 11, "Water, Energy and Food Security in Mexico City" in Otto-Zimmermann, K. (Ed.). (2012). *Resilient Cities 2: Cities and adaptation to climate change: Proceedings of the Global Forum 2011. Dordrecht.
