= Martha Oliver =

Martha Oliver may refer to:

- Martha Capps Oliver (1845-1917), American poet and hymnwriter
- Martha Cranmer Oliver (1834-1880), English actress and theatre manager
