= Saint Martha =

Saint Martha may refer to:

- Martha of Bethany, Biblical character and contemporary of Jesus
- Saints Maris, Martha, Abachum and Audifax, third-century martyrs killed for their faith
- Saint Martha, mother of Simeon Stylites the Younger, saint in the Eastern Orthodox church
- Saint Martha (French), fourth-century nun, wife of St Amator
- St Martha, Surrey, a civil parish in England
