= Martha Masters =

Martha Masters may refer to:

- Martha Masters (musician) (born 1972), American classical guitarist
- Martha Masters (House), a fictional character on the American TV series House
