= Marthe Solange Achy Brou =

Ivorian politician

Marthe Solange Achy Brou was an Ivorian politician.

Born Marthe Solange Biley, she was Minister of Solidarity and Social Affairs in 2000 in the Seydou Diarra government, and vice-president of the National Assembly. She was a member of the National Assembly from 1976 to 1980 and from 1986 to 1990, and also mayor of Grand-Bassam from 1985 to 1990. She died in 2011.
