= Martha J. Ross =

American historian

Martha Jackson Ross (July 18, 1923 – April 5, 2013) was a leading voice in the field of oral history. She conducted oral histories and educated students and peers on best practices and techniques. Ross was the president of the Oral History Association and a founding member and president of the Oral History Association of the Mid-Atlantic Region (OHMAR).

== Early life and education ==
Ross was born in Selma, Alabama. She graduated from Selma High School in 1941. During high school, Ross edited her school newspaper.

Ross attended Montevallo College for Women. Ross wrote for the school newspaper and was an editor of the yearbook. She earned bachelors degrees in English and history in 1945.

Ross returned to school after working and raising her family. In 1969, she enrolled at George Washington University’s Developing New Horizons for Women program. During this 15 week program, she initially thought she wanted to do something in the field of Communications, potentially educational television or program development. However, she read an article in the Washington Post about the Library of Congress’ collection of Federal Writers Project oral history interviews with formerly enslaved peoples in the 1930s and became very interested in the field of oral history; this article was her first encounter with the term “oral history.” Ross wrote a paper for her program on oral history and was later asked by her professor to conduct an oral history project for the Developing New Horizons program.

She later attended the University of Maryland and earned a Masters of Arts degree in 20th Century American History. She earned this degree in 1978.

== Career ==
Ross wrote for her hometown newspaper and as a freelance writer for the Birmingham newspaper.

She moved to Oak Ridge, Tennessee, after her undergraduate graduation to work at the Oak Ridge National Laboratory. She worked as a project staff member on the Manhattan Project.

After raising her six children, Ross went back to school and work, studying and teaching oral history. She taught an oral history course at George Washington University as a part-time staff member from 1971-1972. She taught the course with her peer Meta Armstrong. The course featured several guest speakers that were notable in the field, including Forrest Pogue.

While Ross was a student at the University of Maryland, her historiography instructor Walter Rundell Jr. asked her to teach a seminar on oral history. Her teaching career at the University of Maryland spanned from 1972-1987.

In 1976, Ross co-founded the Oral History Association of the Mid-Atlantic Region. Ross served as president of OHMAR from 1978-1979. She is regarded by some as the “mother” of oral history in the Mid-Atlantic region.

Ross was involved in the drafting of the Oral History Association’s first Evaluation Guidelines. Ross went to Racine, Wisconsin in 1979, and there she and other oral historians set professional standards and created best practices guidelines for the field.

From 1984-1985, Ross was the president of the Oral History Association.

Ross worked with several organizations and provided oral history services to them, including Washington Press Club Foundation, the National Park Service, National History Day, and Society of American Archivists. She presented on many different panels and conferences throughout her career. Ross was also a mentor and an influence to her students, many of whom are regarded voices in the field now.

== Personal life ==
Ross met her husband Dr. Donald M. Ross in Oak Ridge, Tennessee, where they both were working on the Manhattan Project. They were married on August 10, 1946. They had six children together.

Ross died in Fremont, Ohio. She was 89 years of age.

== Awards and legacy ==
Ross was presented with the OHMAR’s Forrest C. Pogue award in 1982. At the OHMAR meeting on November 6, 1982, where she was the awardee and guest of honor, she presented on “Oral History: Teaching and Learning.”

In 1988, Ross’ undergraduate alma mater, University of Montevallo, recognized her as a Distinguished Alumnus.

The Martha Ross Teaching Award was established by the Oral History Association in 2001 in Ross’ honor for her major contributions and impact on the field. In 2007, the University of Maryland, Baltimore County founded the Martha Ross Center for Oral History in her honor. There is also an OHMAR scholarship offered in her name, the Martha Ross Memorial Prize, for students in the field.

== Archival collections ==
- Olch, Peter (September 15, 1982). "Peter Olch Interview 9/15/1982 -- Draft Transcript" (Interview). Interviewed by Martha Ross. Baylor University Libraries.
- Wasserman, Manfred (September 22, 1984). "Manfred Wasserman Interview 9/22/1984 -- Draft Transcript" (Interview). Interviewed by Martha Ross. Baylor University Libraries.
- Greenbelt Oral History Project collection at the University of Maryland libraries
- 16.1.1.1895, Ross, Martha (oral historian): Manuscript, oral history transcript copy with Martha Ross by Mary Jo Deering, February 13, 1974, 2/13/1794-2/13/1974, item: 1895. Maryland Manuscripts collection, 0047-MDHC. Special Collections and University Archives. https://archives.lib.umd.edu//repositories/2/archival_objects/324874 Accessed October 22, 2020.
- UMBC Oral History collection at the University of Maryland, Baltimore County Albin O. Kuhn Library & Gallery
- Oral History Association Records, 1958-2015 (bulk 1970-1999) at the University of North Texas

== Other resources ==
- Lanman, B. A., & University of Maryland, Baltimore County. Martha Ross Center for Oral History. (2009). Baltimore county : celebrating a legacy 1659-2009. Martha Ross Center for Oral History at the University of Maryland, Baltimore County. https://umaryland.on.worldcat.org/oclc/320250416
