= Martha Marek =

Austrian serial killer

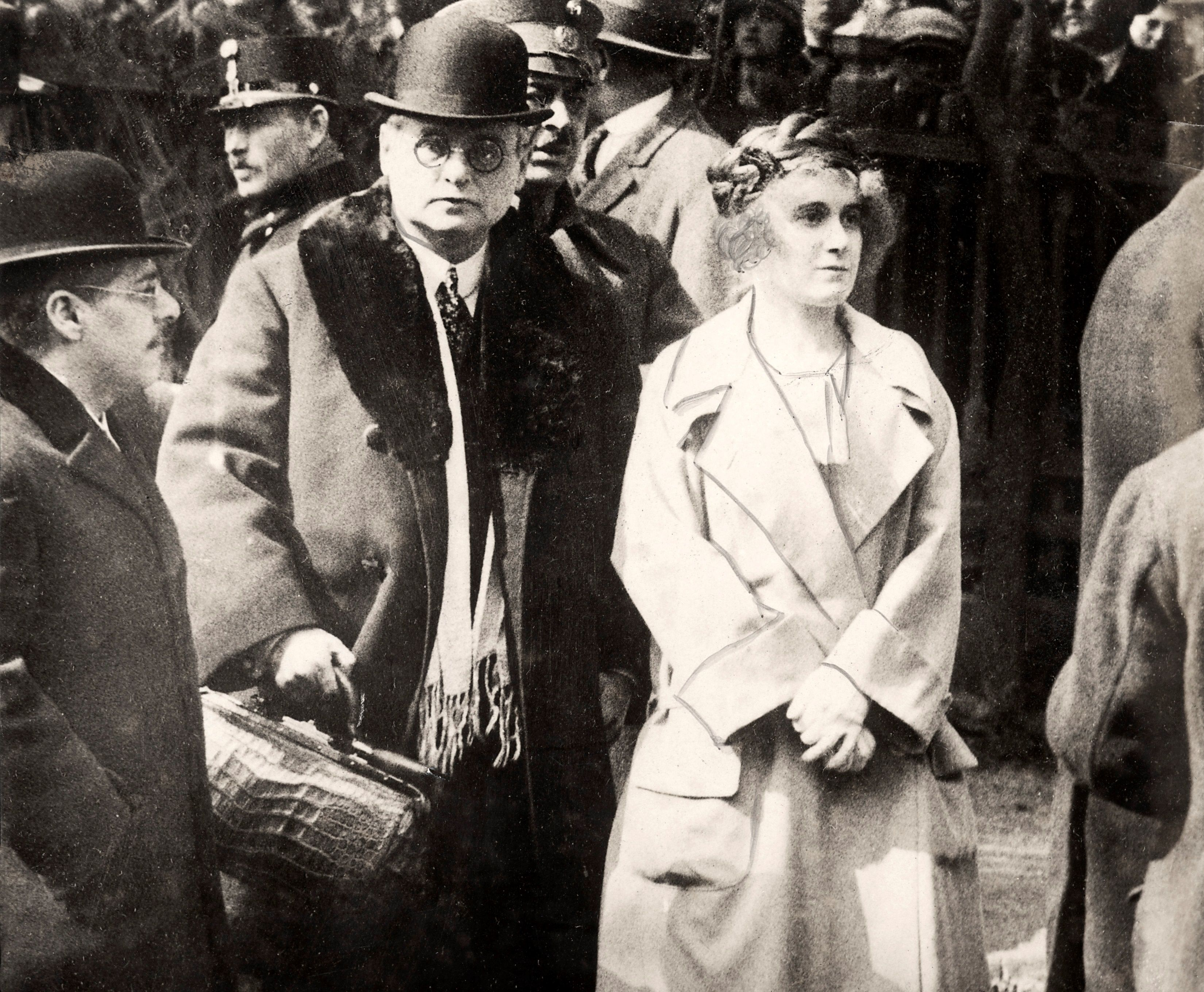
- Born: Martha Löwenstein; 10 October 1897; Vienna, Austria
- Died: 6 December 1938 (aged 40); Vienna, Nazi Germany
- Cause of death: Execution by guillotine
- Conviction: Murder
- Penalty: Death

Details
- Victims: 4
- Span of crimes: 1932–1937
- Country: Austria
- Date apprehended: 1938

Martha Marek (née Löwenstein; 10 October 1897 – 6 December 1938) was an Austrian serial killer who caused media attention during the interwar period.

== Early life ==
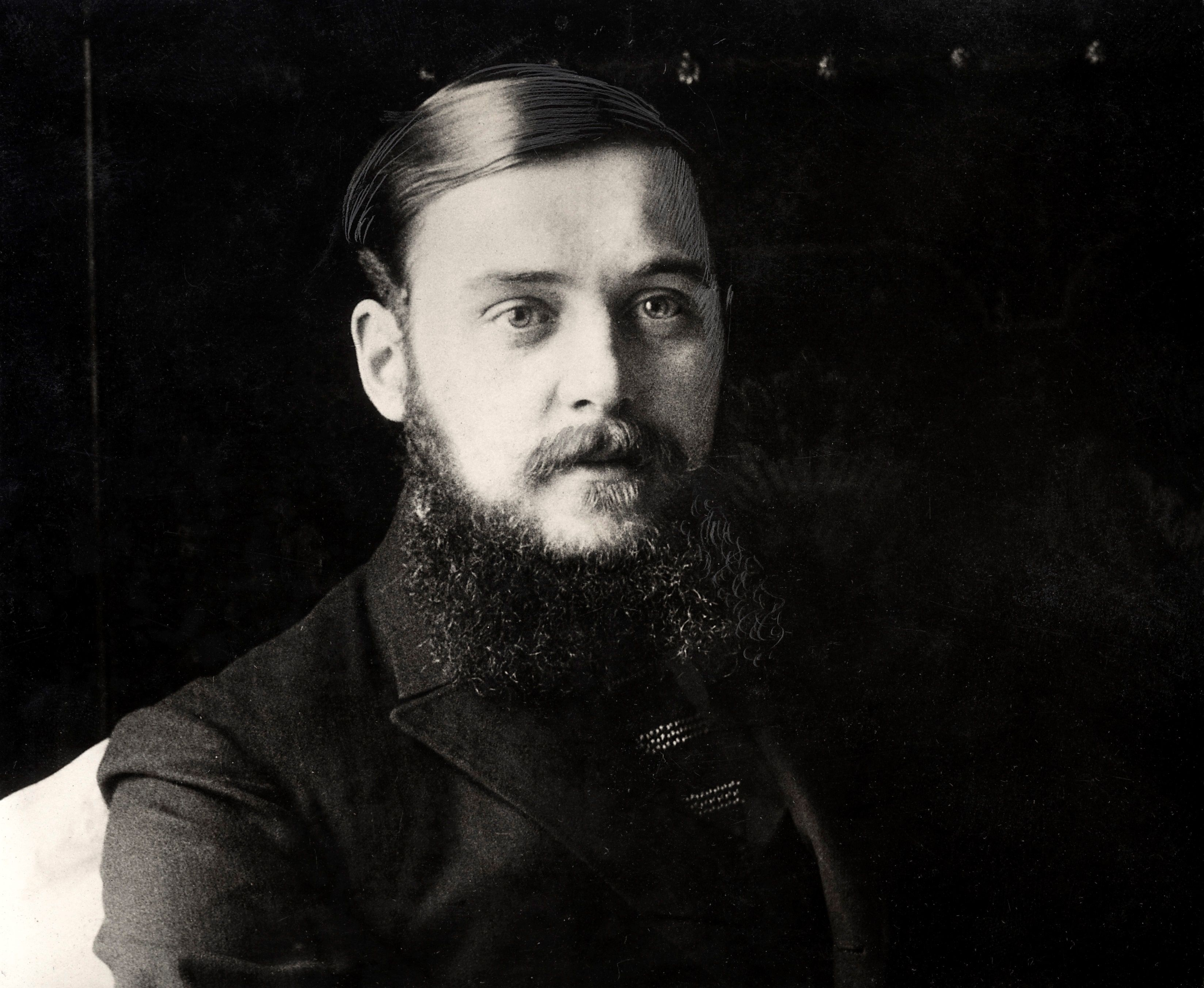
Emil Marek in 1927

Martha was born in Vienna in 1897 but was orphaned at an early age. She was then cared for by a relatively poor family.

In 1919 she was working in a dress shop when she met 74-year-old Mortice Fritch, the rich owner of a department store and 50 years her senior. The following year (aged 23) she became his lover. He sent her to expensive finishing schools in France and England where she got a taste for the rich life. She returned to Vienna to live with Fritch but met engineer Emil Marek and had an affair with him. Fritch died and left Martha his entire estate in the Vienna Woods in August 1923. Martha married Emil in 1924. However, within two years, the money was used up by the couple.

In 1925 Martha and her husband Emil first entered the mass media coverage: Emil had lost his leg while chopping wood on 25 June 1925, a day after Martha had put an insurance policy on him. As the circumstances were very strange to the insurance company, they refused to pay the sum and a lawsuit began. In the course of which, forensics experts were able to clearly prove by multiple traces on the leg that it was self-mutilation. It was ruled that Emil Marek, who was almost fully obedient to his wife, had purposely injured himself to get the insurance benefit.

In a protracted case in April 1927, the court found the Mareks not guilty of insurance fraud but guilty of bribing public officials. A four-month sentence was imposed. As they had already spent over 4 months on remand they were released. The coroner's assistant who was bribed received a 6-week sentence.

The public were largely on the beautiful Marek's side and suspected that the insurance company wanted to suppress the payment through legal mishaps. Despite the announcement of at least partial guilt, the insurance company (having lost their part of the case) agreed to settle the matters out of court and paid a large sum of money.

== After the settlement ==
Legend has it that Martha Marek spent the short prison time in a cell with the poisoner Leopoldine Lichtenstein, who in 1925 had poisoned her husband with the thallium-containing rat paste "Zelio". This allegedly inspired Martha to do her other deeds. As Martha was only ever held on remand, the story does not hold water.

Eventually the media popularity subsided, but the insurance company had paid only 30% of the insured sum, and half of this was paid out in legal fees, so Martha Marek had much less money than she hoped for.

Emil's entrepreneurial plans as an inventor failed, and then the Mareks used up the settlement money, which led to experienced economic hardship.

== Murders ==
After Emil Marek, who had always been sick after the leg amputation, died unexpectedly on 31 July 1932, public attention returned to the widow when her two children developed similar symptoms and their 7-year-old daughter died shortly after Martha had insured their lives. Martha was able to play off the role of a long-suffering widow and mother, and she was given a broad wave of compassion, including financial donations. An aunt of hers, Susanne Löwenstein, even went so far as to appoint her as her sole heir, and promptly died thereafter in 1934. Her symptoms echoed those of Emil and the daughter.

After Marek had used up the inheritance, she found in tailor Felicitas Kittenberger another victim. Kittenberger was taken in by Marek as a subtenant and was persuaded to take life insurance in Martha's favour. Kittenberger died shortly after, which, however, aroused the suspicion of her son, who filed charges. The subsequent investigation and exhumation of the bodies revealed that Marek had murdered all four victims with the toxic Zelio paste, which was then freely available.

In a further insurance fraud, Martha faked the theft of expensive paintings, and for this crime, she was arrested. The publicity from this brought Kittenberger's son to report his suspicions and the various bodies were exhumed and discovered to have been poisoned with thallium. Her surviving son Alfonse was also found to have been poisoned following insurance and was saved.

== Conviction ==
Back in court, Martha Marek faked seizures and blindness, and had to be carried to the courtroom in a specially-constructed chair. The jury sentenced her to death on 19 May 1938, with the court assuming that Marek, a woman, would, in accordance with Austrian tradition, be pardoned by the Federal President and have her death sentence commuted to one of life imprisonment. In the meantime, however, Austria had been annexed to the German Reich and Adolf Hitler rejected the petition for clemency.

Marek was executed on 6 December 1938, as the first delinquent on the guillotine recently brought from Berlin to Vienna. The execution was carried out on the premises of the Vienna Regional Court by the executioner Johann Reichhart.

== Literature ==
- Harald Seyrl: Tatort Wien. Band 2: Die Zeit von 1925–1944. Scharnstein, Wien 2007, ISBN 978-3-90169-709-8.
- Hans-Dieter Otto: Lexikon der ungesühnten Morde. Unaufgeklärte Fälle, Unentdeckte Verbrechen, Umstrittene Freisprüche p. 129 ff, F.A. Herbig, München 2007, ISBN 978-3-7766-2533-2.
- Helga Schimmer: Mord in Wien. Wahre Kriminalfälle. Haymon-Verlag, Innsbruck 2012, ISBN 978-3-85218-876-8. pp. 61–69.
- Christoph Nettersheim: Schrecklich nette Frauen, Bucher, München 2011, ISBN 978-3-7658-1883-7, pp. 10–16

== See also ==
- List of serial killers by country
