= Martha Thomas =

Martha Thomas may refer to:

- M. Carey Thomas (1857–1935), American educator, suffragist, and linguist
- Martha Gibbons Thomas (1869–1942), American politician, suffragist, and dairy farmer
- Martha J. B. Thomas (1926–2006), American chemical engineer and analytical chemist
- Martha Nelson Thomas (1915–2013), American folk artist
- Martha Thomas Fitzgerald (1894–1981), American educator and politician
- Martha Thomas (footballer) (born 1996), Scottish footballer
