= Martha Namundjebo =

Martha Namundjebo can refer to:

- Martha Namundjebo-Tilahun, Namibian business magnate, born Martha Namundjebo
- Lady May (Namibian singer) (born 1986), real name Martha Namundjebo, Namibian singer
