= Martha MacDonald (disambiguation) =

Martha MacDonald or McDonald may refer to:

- Martha MacDonald, Canadian feminist economist
- Martha MacDonald (Monarch of the Glen), a fictional character in the British TV series Monarch of the Glen
- Martha McDonald, artist
