= Martha Mears (author) =

Martha Mears was an eighteenth-century midwife and author.

Mears was a midwife, mother, and author in London, England. Her work, Pupil of Nature, was published in 1797. The full title is Pupil of Nature: or Candid advice to the fair sex, on the subjects of pregnancy, childbirth, the diseases incident to both, the fatal effects of ignorance and quackery, and the most approved means of promoting health, strength and beauty of their offspring. It consists of 11 essays, each divided into numbered sections, about topics from the state of the womb before and after conception, to the effect of music on nerves. She depicted the pregnant woman as a cluster of symptoms to be managed, particularly with regard to her psychological state. Mears subscribed to the common notion that "irritability" of the pregnant woman’s uterus induced a heightened "sensibility". The organization and broad scope of the text mirrored this representation of the body as a bundle of potential pathologies. A contemporary review of her work describes its purpose being to teach women the important advantages of pursuing nature's plans in everything that relates to the pregnant state. Mears' studied the writings of Harvey, Leake, Smellie and Denman.

== Legacy ==
Mears' was the last major contributor to the eighteenth-century midwifery dispute. Her work is considered an eighteenth-century version of the popular prenatal guide What to Expect When You’re Expecting.

In 1979, the American feminist artist Judy Chicago paid tribute to Mears by including her in her major work The Dinner Party.
