= Martha Clark =

Martha Clark may refer to:

- Martha Fuller Clark (born 1942), member of the New Hampshire Senate
- Martha Strickland Clark (1853–1935), American lawyer

== See also ==
- Martha Clarke (born 1944), American theater director and choreographer
- Martha Clark Kent, fictional character in Superman stories
