= Martha deMey Clow =

American novelist

- Born: November 16, 1932; Columbus, Ohio, United States
- Died: June 16, 2010 (aged 77)
- Writing career
- Period: 1970–2010
- Genre: Science fiction
- Notable work: Starbreed

Martha deMey Clow (1932–2010) was an American writer of science fiction, author of the 1970 novel Starbreed.

== Biography ==
Clow was born November 16, 1932, in Columbus Ohio, daughter of Charles deMey and Amelia Smith. She earned her BA from Smith college in 1954, and began a career as a commercial artist and architect, though she maintained a lifelong interest in the hard sciences, stating in an interview in Science Fiction and Fantasy Literature, "I have always had a strong bent for science and math." She noted that this made her unusual among her female peers, and regarding gender bias in the world of science fiction, said, "I think women read science fiction as much as men ... If women were trained more generally in science and math, perhaps their writing would run to that field, also." She credited her interest in science fiction on her father, an engineer, who would read only that genre.

Clow was married to accountant John W. Clow and had five children. Clow died on June 16, 2010, in Marin County, CA.

== Critical response ==
San Rafael's Daily Independent Journal described the book as "an imaginative, well-constructed, suspenseful tale... National and international politics are skillfully integral with interstellar heroics".

Writing for Luna Monthly, Samuel Mines emphasized Clow's potential as a writer, calling her debut (and, ultimately, sole) novel Starbreed (about a band of half-human, half-Centaurean orphans who rise to prominence on Earth due to their exceptional intelligence and physical strength) "an ambitious undertaking." Although the novel suffered in his view for failing to fully realize its own potential, he called it "quite good" overall, and concluded, "I expect we'll hear a good deal more from this author."

== Bibliography ==
- Starbreed (1970) OCLC 3154666
