= Martha Burton =

US sport bowling pioneer (1913–2007)

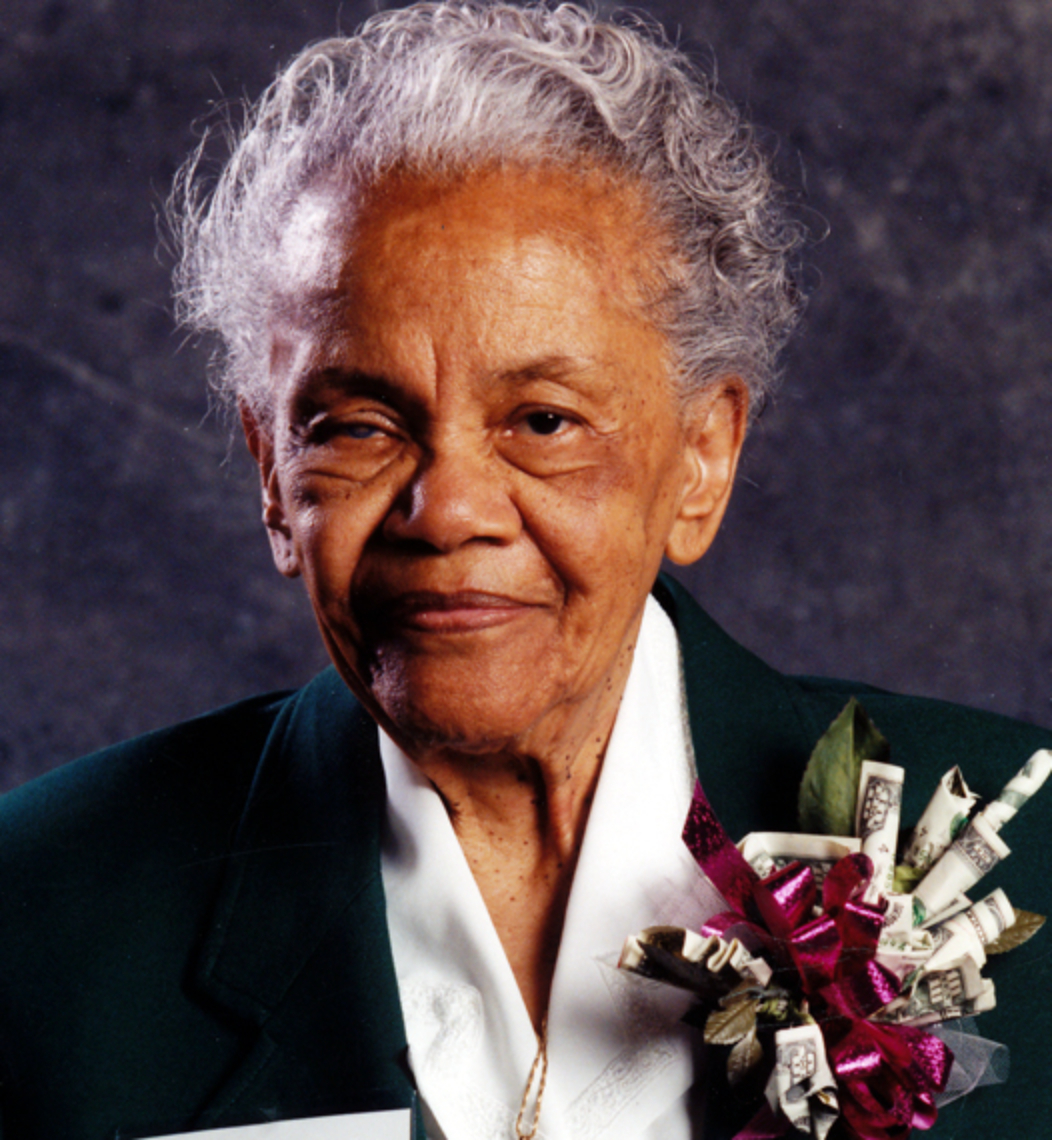
Martha Burton, Bowling Hall of Famer

Martha Edna Mae Burton (February 4, 1913 – August 7, 2007) was a pioneer in the sport of bowling, advancing the sport through racial tensions that divided African-Americans and Caucasians during World War II and contributing to its growth for over five decades. Through her extensive work and support of minorities in bowling, Martha became one of the most respected bowling advocates in the nation and is noted for bridging the gap between Black and White bowlers.

== Personal life ==
Martha was born on February 4, 1913, to parents Paul and Mary Burton (née Barlow) in Washington D.C. She had one older sister, Mary. Martha would go on to marry William W. Burton.

In addition to her love of bowling, Martha loved children, and was a beloved and dedicated Kindergarten teacher, coach, and mentor, helping to motivate youths to excel on and off the lanes. Her dedication to youth bowlers inspired her to serve as a coach and volunteer for the Washington D.C. Area Young American Bowling Alliance. She also served as director of the former American Junior Bowling Congress and was a charter member of the Vir-Mir-District YABA board, where she served for 32 years helping to broaden the sport's awareness to youths. Additionally, Martha also served on many local, state and national youth boards, organized leagues, ran tournaments and spent countless hours on the lanes teaching kids how to bowl. In addition to teaching, Martha was a riveter, helping to build airplanes during the war, as well as an active volunteer with the U.S. Signal Corps.

Martha died on August 7, 2007, at the age of 93. She was laid to rest next to her husband, William Burton, at Quantico National Cemetery in Virginia.

=== Contributions and legacy ===
Martha fell in love with tenpin bowling at a young age after being invited to bowl with friends on the lanes at St. Christopher's Church in Chicago. Her work with the Signal Corps relocated her to Washington D.C., where she become instrumental in the organization and development of the Washington D.C. Area Women's Bowling Association, the Greater Washington Bowling Senate, and a number of other bowling clubs and leagues.

Martha promoted tenpin bowling for over 55 years as a volunteer and member of the Women's International Bowling Congress (WIBC) and the National Bowling Association (TNBA), serving as chairman of the National TNBA Hall of Fame and Eastern representative of the National TNBA junior ro. She was the first Black delegate to attend a WIBC Convention, and the only Black member at the formation of the Virginia State Women's Bowling Association of which she was instrumental in instituting.

She organized the first black league in the nation's capital, and the first National Bowling Association Senate. She bowled with the first all-black women's team in her city and state associations, became the first black president of a WIBC local association, and was a driving force in TNBA. She was the first black delegate to the WIBC Convention in 1954.

She was an active member of the WDCAWBA, joining the board of Directors in 1951, acting director for 12 years, elected 3rd vice-president for eight years, then served as president elect for another 8 years.

=== Awards and accomplishments ===
Among her many honors, Burton was inducted into the Virginia WBA Hall of Fame in 1980, the Washington, D.C. Area WBA Hall of Fame in 1983, the TNBA Hall of Fame in 1989 and granted WIBC Member Emerita status in 1997. She was also inducted into the United States Bowling Congress (USBC) Hall of Fame posthumously in 2007 as a Pioneer of the sport she loved.
