= Martha Young =

Martha Young may refer to:

== Name ==
- Martha Ellen Young Truman (1852–1947), mother of U.S. president Harry Truman
- Martha Strudwick Young (1862–1941), American writer
- Martha Young-Scholten, linguist

== Other ==
- Young Martha, American collaborative extended play
