= Martha Vital =

Mexican politician

- Born: 20 September 1963 (age 62); Chiapas, Mexico
- Occupation: Deputy
- Political party: PVEM

Martha Edith Vital Vera (born 20 September 1963) is a Mexican politician affiliated with the PVEM. As of 2013 she served as Deputy of the LXII Legislature of the Mexican Congress representing Chiapas.
