= Martha Gillette =

Chronobiologist and neurobiologist

Martha Ulbrick Gillette is a chronobiologist and neurobiologist with research focusing on the effects of circadian clocks on integrative brain functions metabolism and the molecular mechanisms involved in signaling pathways. She is a fellow of the American Association for the Advancement of Science.

== Education and career ==
Gillette attended Grinnell College, where she received a B.A. in biology. She went on to receive an M.S. in zoology from the University of Hawaiʻi and a Ph.D. in developmental biology from the University of Toronto in 1976. Gillette conducted postdoctoral research at the University of California, Santa Cruz. In 1978, Gillette began her professorship at University of Illinois at Urbana-Champaign where she has remained as both a researcher and a professor.

== Research ==
Gillette's research at the University of Illinois, Urbana-Champaign (UIUC) focuses on the relationship between the suprachiasmatic nucleus (SCN) and cells in the hippocampus, as well as how those interactions are influenced by the changes in the circadian rhythm. Gillette's research has shown that the suprachiasmatic nucleus (SCN) generates ~24h neuronal oscillations in rat hypothalamic brain slice in vitro, and she has investigated temporal windows of sensitivity to circadian phase-shifting by different resetting stimuli, including secondary messengers, hormones, and neuropeptide. Gillette has demonstrated how melatonin, a nonphotic Zeitgeber, can directly reset the rat SCN in vitro, and described how E-box mediated transcriptions of Per1 and Per2 are necessary for proper melatonin signaling during the resetting of SCN clock at dusk. Gillette first discovered that SCN redox state exhibits self-sustained circadian oscillations, which requires the functional molecular clockwork of the Bmal1 gene. This ~24hr redox oscillation of SCN dictates its own neuronal excitability via non-transcriptional modulation of potassium (K+) channel.

== Selected publications ==
- Ding, Jian M.; Chen, Dong; Weber, E. Todd; Faiman, Lia E.; Rea, Michael A.; Gillette, Martha U. (1994-12-09). "Resetting the Biological Clock: Mediation of Nocturnal Circadian Shifts by Glutamate and NO". Science. 266 (5191): 1713–1717. Bibcode:1994Sci...266.1713D. doi:10.1126/science.7527589. ISSN 0036-8075. PMID 7527589.
- McArthur, Angela J.; Gillette, Martha U.; Prosser, Rebecca A. (1991-11-22). "Melatonin directly resets the rat suprachiasmatic circadian clock in vitro". Brain Research. 565 (1): 158–161. doi:10.1016/0006-8993(91)91748-P. ISSN 0006-8993. PMID 1773352. S2CID 15501781.
- McArthur, Angela J.; Hunt, Amanda E.; Gillette, Martha U. (1997-02-01). "Melatonin Action and Signal Transduction in the Rat Suprachiasmatic Circadian Clock: Activation of Protein Kinase C at Dusk and Dawn*". Endocrinology. 138 (2): 627–634. doi:10.1210/endo.138.2.4925. ISSN 0013-7227. PMID 9002996.
- Gillette, Martha Ulbrick; Reppert, Steven M. (1987-07-01). "The hypothalamic suprachiasmatic nuclei: Circadian patterns of vasopressin secretion and neuronal activity in vitro". Brain Research Bulletin. 19 (1): 135–139. doi:10.1016/0361-9230(87)90176-6. ISSN 0361-9230. PMID 3651837. S2CID 2542479.

== Awards and honors ==
Gillette was named a fellow of the American Association for the Advancement of Science in 1995. In 2004, Gillette received the Mika Salpeter Lifetime Achievement Award from the Society for Neuroscience. In 2021, she won the Beckman Institute's Vision and Spirit award.
