= Martha Meir Allen =

Canadian temperance activist and writer

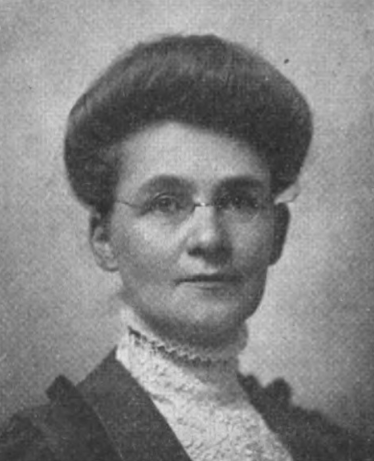
- Born: March 31, 1854; Owen Sound, Ontario, Canada
- Died: 1926 (aged 71–72)
- Occupation(s): Temperance activist, writer
- Spouse: James E. Allen (m. 1880)

Martha Meir Allen (March 31, 1854 – 1926) was a Canadian temperance activist and writer.

== Biography ==
Allen was born at Owen Sound, Ontario. She married Rev. James E. Allen in June, 1880 and they moved to New York in 1885. She became active in the temperance movement. In 1889, Allen was appointed Superintendent of the Department of Non-Alcoholic Medication for the National Woman's Christian Temperance Union. In 1906, she became Superintendent of the Department of Medical Temperance.

Allen campaigned against the medical use of alcoholic liquors and against soft drinks containing drugs. To determine alcohol content Allen took samples of proprietary remedies to the Massachusetts State Board of Health for analysis. The chemists found that the preparations contained from 5 to 40 percent alcohol. She presented the results in 1887 at a convention in Buffalo, New York. Allen published the results in an article, "The Danger and Harmfulness of Patent Medicines" in the Christian Advocate which revealed the presence of alcohol in patent medicines. She campaigned against the use of whisky in the treatment of tuberculosis. Allen attempted to persuade the Massachusetts Medical Association to denounce the use of alcohol and narcotics.

As Superintendent of the Department of Medical Temperance she was involved in a national program that exposed dangerous patent medicines and liquid foods. The department aimed to convince medical authorities to discontinue prescribing alcohol. The national department sent 25,000 leaflets to local and state unions outlining their objectives. Allen reported that non-alcoholic medicine was "growing in favor" and new members were specializing in activism. The department was responsible for generating a large amount of pure drink and temperance literature.

Allen represented the United States at the Twelfth International Congress on Alcoholism held in London in 1909. She authored Alcohol a Dangerous and Unnecessary Medicine, in 1900. A new issue was published in 1910 and copies were placed in medical libraries across Canada and the United States. A review in the Journal of the American Medical Association commented that it is "worthy of respectful consideration by physicians, though all may not accept fully its conclusions". It has been described as the first book that provided evidence against fraudulent patent medicine testimonials.

== Selected publications ==
- Alcohol: A Dangerous and Unnecessary Medicine (1900)
