= Martha Lux-Steiner =

Swiss physicist

Martha Christina Lux-Steiner, (née Steiner; December 18, 1950, Bern), is a Swiss physicist. From 1995 to 2016 she was the first female tenured professor in the department of physics at the FU Berlin. Lux-Steiner holds a Federal Cross of Merit, 1st class.

== Life und Works ==
=== Early years ===
Martha Steiner grew up in Eastern Switzerland from 1952. She attended the gymnasium at the cantonal school St. Gallen. From 1970 to 1975 she studied physics and mathematics at the ETH Zürich and completed her foundational studies at the Institute for Biomedical Technology, with a diploma on the subject of computed tomography. Subsequently, she transferred to the Institut for Toxicology at the ETH Zürich, where she worked on her doctoral thesis on the topic of atomic emission spectroscopy (ICP-OES) titled "Entwicklung und Anwendung des induktiv gekoppelten Hochfrequenzplasmas als emissionsspektroskopische Messmethode für die Spurenelementanalytik in organischem Material". She performed the experiments for her thesis at the former Philips Natuurkundig Laboratorium (NatLab) in Eindhoven, The Netherlands. For this work she was awarded a doctorate from the ETH Zürich in 1981.

In addition to her scientific work, from 1987 to 1955 she was active as a certified ski teacher at the ski school St. Gallen and later in the Schwäbischer Skiverband.

=== Scientific career ===
1980 she accepted a position as a researcher at the faculty of physics of the University of Konstanz. Her research and development themes focussed on the single crystal growth of new semiconductor materials and high temperature superconductors as well as the epitaxis of metal-metal and metal-insulator multilayers and their possible applications in optoelectronics with focus in photovoltaics and in solarthermics, especially in high-temperature solar collectors and in thermoelectric generators. 1990 to 1991 she suspended her activities to accept a guest stipend for a research visit to Princeton University, Dept. of Electrical Engineering (USA). After her return and her habilitation at the University of Konstand with "venia legendi in experimental physics" she was appointed temporary extraordinary professor at the faculty of physics.

1995 Lux-Steiner received an offer as ordinary professor at the Free University Berlin in connection with a position as head of the Abteilung Heterogene Materialsysteme in the area solid-state physics at the former Hahn-Meitner-Institut (HMI), Berlin. This made her the first woman to hold a professorship at the FU Berlin. After the merging of the HMI and the BESSY and the associated internal reorganization of the newly created Helmholtz-Zentrum Berlin für Materialien und Energie (HZB) she continued her research activities, now as the director of the Instituts Heterogene Materialsysteme in the division of solar energy of the HZB, until her retirement in 2016.

== Awards ==
1999 Lux-Steiner received the Federal Cross of Merit, first class from the then president Johannes Rau, handed over in Schloss Bellevue in Berlin "for her scientific achievements in the area of solar energy gain and her special engagement for the regional cooperation between industry and research".

== Further Awards and Honors ==
- 1990 guest stipend for a one-year research visit at Princeton University, Department of Electrical Engineering.
- 2004 Hahn-Meitner-Technologie-Transfer-Preis
- 2015 Deutscher Solarpreis 2015 in Form des "Sonderpreises für persönliches Engagement" für ihr Lebenswerk als engagierte Wissenschaftlerin in der Energieforschung und Lehre
- 2016 Nomination for the Lehrpreis der FU Berlin 2015

== Publications ==
- Martha Lux-Steiner, H.H. Hohl: Aufgabensammlung zur Festkörperphysik. Springer-Verlag, 1994. ISBN 978-3-642-78288-6
