= Martha Elizabeth Zitter =

Martha Elizabeth Zitter (Born in the 17th century) was a Roman Catholic German nun who later in life converted to Lutheranism. Her letter to her parents regarding her conversion is often cited by present-day Protestants as a powerful argument for Protestantism over Catholicism. She returned to the Catholic faith and life as a nun 3 months after conversion.

== Biography ==
Zitter was sent to the White-Ladies convent of the Ursuline Order in Erfurt by her mother when she was 14 years old. She was sent to the convent under coercion to learn the French language, womanly virtues, and respectable work that was suited for women during this time. At 22 years old Zitter decided that she was unhappy with the Catholic faith and made the decision to leave the church and follow the Protestant reformation, and become a Lutheran. When her mother got word of her leaving the convent and the Catholic Church she made her announce her reasons of conversion publicly through a letter.

Zitter complied with her mother's demand and wrote a letter describing why she had decided to leave the Ursuline order and dedicate her life to professing the “true evangelical religion”, Lutheranism. In her letter, Zitter decried the mortification of the flesh that was practiced at the convent. She believed that this type of worship had no basis in the scriptures. She goes on to tell her mother that the practice of indulgences, praying to saints, and the notion of purgatory contradict the Bible and are therefore all ideas adopted by men and not of the Lord. She backs up her claim with the Protestant view of preferring Christian good works as well as keeping the Lord's commandments to show faith.

Already a few months later, in June 1678, she renounced her conversion and returned to Catholicism, joining the St. Ursula convent in Kitzingen in Bavaria. She described the reasons for her return to Catholicism in an autobiographical pamphlet.

== Legacy ==
To this day some Protestant religions use Zitter's letter to her mother as a document of detailed argumentation of the Protestant faith and views compared to those of the catholic religion, and its persuasive points on converting to the reformed belief.
