= Martha Foster =

Martha Foster may refer to:

- Madame Foster, Martha "Madame" Foster, in the animated TV series Foster's Home for Imaginary Friends
- Martha Foster, in the 1949 mystery film Alias Nick Beal
- Martha Foster Crawford (1830–1909), American writer and missionary
- Martha M. Foster, American founder and executive director of Living Earth Television
