= Martha Friedman =

American sculptor

- Born: 1975 (age 50–51); Detroit, Michigan
- Education: B.F.A.: The School of the Art Institute of Chicago (1998); M.F.A.: Yale University (2003)
- Notable work: Cucumbers (2005), Nails (2005), Melons (2005), Plug (2006), Laid (2006), Bangers (2007), Waffle (2008), Rubbers (2008), Tongue Flap (2010), Pucker (2010)
- Website: Martha Friedman Work

Martha Friedman is a sculptor and college professor residing in New York City. Her work has been exhibited throughout the world in both solo and group exhibitions. Her primary exhibitor is Wallspace in New York. She has taught classes at The Cooper Union, Pratt Institute, Princeton University, Rutgers University, Wesleyan University and Yale University.

== Solo exhibitions ==
=== 2012 ===
- Caught, Wallspace, New York, NY

=== 2010 ===
- Museum of Contemporary Art Detroit, MI
- DeCordova Museum and Sculpture Park, Lincoln, MA
- Shane Campbell Gallery, Chicago, IL

=== 2009 ===
- The Organization of Batter, Wallspace, New York, NY

=== 2007 ===
- Not Simply Connected, Wallspace, New York, NY

== Group exhibitions ==
=== 2010 ===
- Rock Garden, Salon 94 Freemans, New York, NY
- Herd Thinner-organized by David Hunt, Charest-Weinberg Gallery, Miami, NY

=== 2009 ===
- New York Minute—organized by Kathy Grayson, MACRO, Rome
- In the Between—organized by Suzanne Egeran, Istanbul, Turkey
- Offset—curated by Matthew Spiegelman, Mt Tremper Arts, Mt Tremper, NY
- Time-Life Part Two, Taxter & Spengemann, New York, NY
- From Yarn to Yucca-A Continuation of the Dialogue Between Abstraction and Figuration, John Connelly Presents, New York, NY
- Submerging Artists—curated by General Store, The Dark Fair, Koelnischer Kunstverein, Cologne, Germany
- Presents, Rowley Kennerk Gallery, Chicago

=== 2008 ===
- The Station—curated by Nate Lowman and Shamim M, Momim, Miami, FL
- Public Art Fund at Metrotech, Metrotech Center, Brooklyn, NY
- Lost in the Supermarket, Armand Bartos Fine Art, New York, NY
- Thank You for Coming Triple Candie, Triple Candie, New York, NY

=== 2007 ===
- Bunch, Alliance and Dissolve, Contemporary Art Center, Cincinnati, OH

=== 2006 ===
- Mystic River II, Arcadia University Art Gallery, Glenside, PA.
- EAF 06, Socrates Sculpture Park, Long Island City, NY
- Mystic River, curator Noah Sheldon, SouthFirst Gallery, Brooklyn, NY
- Space Between The Spokes, KS Art, New York, NY
- Dynasty, curator Omar Lopez-Chahoud, Gallery MC, New York, NY

=== 2005 ===
- Excitations curator Matt Keegan, Andrew Kreps Gallery, New York, NY
- North Drive Press Issue 2, collaboration with Rachel Harrison

=== 2004 ===
- The Reality of Things, Triple Candie, New York, NY
- Buy American, curator Joe Scanlan, Galerie Chez Valentin, Paris, France
- G C G, Art in the Office, 22 Courtland St. New York, NY

== Reviews and publications ==
- "500 Words: Martha Friedman," Artforum.com, September 10, 2010.
- Douglas, Sarah, “Summer in the City: Group Shows,” Artinfo, July 24, 2009
- Robinson, Walter, “Weekend Update,” Artnet, July 22, 2009
- Rochelle Steiner and Abigail Clark, Trapdoor, Public Art Fund, April 2009.
- Momin, Shamim M., “Future Greats,” Art Review, March 2009.
- Vogel, Carol, ‘Inside Art: Appetite For Sculpture,’ The New York Times, November 7, 2008
- ‘Bunch, Alliance and Dissolve, exhibition catalogue, November, 2006
- Saltz, Jerry, ‘The Undead of Art History,’ The Village Voice, October 30, 2006
- Fry, Naomi, ‘EAF06: 2006 Emerging Artist Exhibition,’ Critics’ Pick, Artforum.com Oct 6, 2006
- Alemani, Cecilia, ‘Mystic River,’ Critics’ Pick, ArtForum.com, May 31, 2006
- ‘Mystic River’ exhibition catalogue, May 2006
- Cotter, Holland, ‘Art in Review: Mystic River,’ The New York Times, May 19, 2006
- ‘Dynasty’ exhibition catalogue, March 2006
- ‘ETC.’ exhibition catalogue, September 2005
- Cotter, Holland, ‘Art in Review: ‘Justin Lowe,’ The New York Times, August 5, 2005
- Johnson, Ken, ‘The Reality of Things,’ The New York Times, June 18, 2004
- Ammirati, Domenick, ‘Art in the Office,’ Critics’ Picks, ArtForum.com, April 13, 2004
- Selbach, Gerard, ‘Buy American,’ Paris Art, March 6, 2004
