= Martha Rogers =

Martha Rogers may refer to:

- Martha E. Rogers (1914–1994), American nurse, researcher, theorist and author
- Martha Rogers (professor) (born 1955), American author and adjunct professor at Duke University
- Mattie Rogers (Martha Ann Rogers, born 1995), American weightlifter

== See also ==
- Martha Rodgers, Castle character played by Susan Sullivan during 2009–2016
