= Martha Takane =

Mexican mathematician

Martha Yoko Takane Imay is a Mexican mathematician whose research topics include linear algebra, representation theory, and algebraic combinatorics. She is a professor at the National Autonomous University of Mexico (UNAM) and a researcher in the UNAM Institute of Mathematics.

== Education and career ==
Takane studied mathematics at UNAM, earning a bachelor's degree in 1986, master's degree in 1988, and PhD in 1992. Her doctoral dissertation, Propiedades espectrales de las matrices de Coxeter y las matrices de adyacencia de las algebras hereditarias de tipo salvaje, was supervised by José Antonio de la Peña.

She has been a faculty member at UNAM since 1991 and a researcher in the Mathematical Institute since 1992. She was a postdoctoral researcher at Bielefeld University and the University of Trondheim, and has taught at the Autonomous University of Mexico State since 2006.

She has also been active in encouraging women in mathematics in Mexico, and co-founded a center for gender studies at UNAM.

== Recognition ==
Takane won the 1992 Weizmann Prize for the best doctoral thesis in the exact sciences in Mexico. She was elected to the Mexican Academy of Sciences in 1998. In 2007 UNAM gave her their Sor Juana Inés de la Cruz prize.
