= Martha Ittuluka'naaq =

Inuk artist

- Born: 1912 near Kazan River, Nunavut, Canada
- Died: 1981 (aged 68–69)

Martha Ittuluka'naaq (1912–1981) was an Inuk artist known for her drawings and prints.

Ittuluka'naaq was born near the Kazan River, Nunavut and her family relocated to Baker Lake in 1961.

Her work is included in the collections of the National Gallery of Canada and the McMichael Canadian Art Collection.
