= Martha McCaughey =

American academic and author (born 1966)

- Born: October 25, 1966 (age 59)
- Education: University of Michigan (B.A.); University of California, Santa Barbara (PhD)
- Occupation: Academic
- Writing career
- Language: English
- Period: Late 1990s–present
- Subjects: Feminism, self-defense, film, cyberactivism, Evolution, movie violence
- Notable work: Real Knockouts

Martha McCaughey (born October 25, 1966) is an American academic and author. She was the director of Women's Studies at Appalachian State University at, prior to that, at Virginia Tech. Her research and writings have dealt extensively with evolutionary psychology as applied to gender. She is the author of The Caveman Mystique: Pop-Darwinism and the Debates over Sex, Violence, and Science (2008, Routledge), which takes an original perspective on the "science wars" and also challenges both evolutionary psychologists and their feminist critics to think about masculinities as textual.

== Writings ==
Among McCaughey's writings are two similarly titled books: Real Knockouts: the Physical Feminism of Women’s Self-Defense (ISBN 0-8147-5577-1) in 1997 and Reel Knockouts: Violent Women in the Movies (ISBN 0-292-75251-2), which she co-edited in 2001 with Neal King.

Real Knockouts made McCaughey's mark in feminist theory, as the first comprehensive attempt to bridge the gap between academia and mainstream women's self-defense. In it, she defines the self-defense movement serves as a form of feminist empowerment and consciousness raising that can be used to make feminist theory accessible to women who would otherwise be unreceptive. She also proposes the idea that by participating in self-defense, women change the definition of femininity and alter the gender roles, both male and female, that support existing rape culture. Although McCaughey takes a generally positive stance regarding self-defense, and dedicates a chapter to countering various criticisms of women's self-defense from within feminist theory, she does acknowledge and examine several practical and legal concerns with self-defense. As part of that, she analyzes the legal repercussions of violent self-defense, including consideration of the way that racism, classism, sexism, and stereotypes concerning battered wife syndrome affect the legal system's judgement on whether or not a woman's self-defense is legitimate.

Reel Knockouts (co-edited with Neal M. King) is a collection of essays that examine portrayals of violent women in film.

She is also the co-editor, with Michael D. Ayers, of Cyberactivism: Online Activism in Theory and Practice (2003, Routledge), and the editor of Cyberactivism on the Participatory Web (2014, Routledge).

Most recently, McCaughey has written a number of essays on feminism, academic freedom, and the purpose of the university.
