= Martha Kwataine =

Malawian health and human rights activist

- Education: University of Malawi, Bunda College (BSc Agriculture, Diploma) University of Malawi, Chancellor College (MA Economics) University of Roehampton, London (Postgraduate Certificate in Public Health)
- Occupations: Health and Human rights activist
- Years active: 2006–present
- Known for: Former Executive Director, Malawi Health Equity Network

Martha Kwataine is a Malawian health and human rights activist, and the former executive director of the Health Equity Network (MHEN).

In October 2006, Kwataine joined the Malawi Health Equity Network (MHEN), and became its executive director. She succeeded the late Paul Msoma who was MHEN's first Executive Director(National Coordinator). MHEN is an "independent alliance of organizations and individuals promoting equity and quality" in health care, and is based in Lilongwe, the capital of Malawi.

In 2010, a MHEN report showed that the government's health department had spent 50–60% of its budget on activities at its headquarters, rather than on facilities across the country. Kwataine commented: "This is money spent on allowances and four-wheel drive vehicles that race in the streets of the capital, yet 80 percent of Malawians are in the rural areas where health problems are forever acute".

In 2012, Kwataine moved to Washington D.C. in the United States to lobby the US government for help and support.

In 2012, Kwataine was chosen by the former president Joyce Banda to become the board chair of Malawi communications Regulatory authority MACRA. At MACRA she remained controversial and continued to question the government as an activist at one point she contradicted Banda whose government had wanted to rehire the then director general.

In November 2015, Kwataine unexpectedly resigned as executive director of the Malawi Health Equity Network. She is reported to have left MEHN to take up a job with ActionAid.

In 2016, Kwataine left ActionAid and went on to head the Baobab Health Trust (BHT). In BHT, she worked hand-in-hand with Malawian hospitals to ensure that the hospitals would have electronic medical records they were doing well till when their biggest donor pulled out. At MHEN, she was succeeded by George Jobe, the former Executive Director of the Creative Centre for Community Mobilization (CRECCOM).

In October 2020, Kwataine left BHT, having been appointed by Lazarus Chakwera to be the presidential advisor on Civil Society Organization, and from her remarks she seemed to be pro-ruling party.
