= Martha Lewis =

Martha Lewis may refer to:

- Martha Lewis (skipjack), a Chesapeake Bay fishing boat built in 1955
- Martha Lena Morrow Lewis (1868–1950), American orator, political organizer, journalist, and newspaper editor
- Martha S. Lewis (1924–2007), African American government official and social worker
- Martha D Lewis (born 1967), British-born Cypriot recording artist
