= Martha Custis =

Martha Custis may refer to:

- Martha Washington (1731–1802), married name Martha Custis, widow of Daniel Custis and First First Lady of the United States
- Martha Parke Custis (1756–1773), daughter of above
- Martha Parke Custis Peter (1777–1854), née Martha Custis, granddaughter of Martha Washington and niece of above
