= Martha Araújo =

Brazilian sculpture and performance artist

Martha Araújo (born 1943) in Maceió, Brazil is a Brazilian sculptor and performance artist. She lives and works in Maceió the capital of Alagoas in Brazil. The style of her work was performance and sculpture art. She also explored her body with her performances. Her art emerged at the end of a military dictatorship that lasted from 1964 to 1985. She used their experiences during the dictatorship in her artwork to show how they felt trapped. Using textiles Araújo demonstrates the limit of the body through the play between repression and freedom. However, sculptures and performances were not her only interest she has also explored photography and video.

== Education ==
Martha Araújo studied education at Universidade Federal do Rio de Janeiro and graduated in the year of 1970. She earned a degree in pedagogy at Universidade Federal do Rio de Janeiro. She earned her master's degree in education from Pontifícia Universidade Católica do Rio de Janeiro. She was able to work under Haroldo Barroso, a sculptor, at the Museu do Ingá in Niterói throughout 1984 and 1987. In 1986 she went on to study at the Escola de Artes Visuais do Parque Lage in Rio de Janeiro.

== Artwork ==
=== Hábito/Habitante, 1985 ===
Araújo had two solo exhibitions where her performance of Hábito/Habitante was performed by participants. Araújo had a series of photographs that made up Hábito/Habitante. The performers used textile (cloth) in the shape of a half-moon stuck to a wall, another large cloth that two or more people can participate as a whole and the participants in capacete (helmet). The performers are inside a piece of cloth and move around to free themselves from repression. They try to separate from each other, so they need to work together as a whole to be able to escape. Capacete is a performance from the Hábito/Habitante series. In the Capacete performance the performers have helmets made out of cloth that are tied together.

=== Quardo Dobrável Espaço Real,1985 ===
Quardo Dobrável Espaço Real, are metal plates stitched together that can be manipulated by the movement of the performer. It takes the shape of the performer when it is moving. This sculpture can be seen as plastic art because it can create a new shape.

=== Para um corpo nas suas impossibilidades, 1985 ===
In this art piece she uses a ramp, a body suit with Velcro, and herself to stick herself or others to show how they feel free. They jump onto the ramp and are stuck there experiencing repression and freedom because once a person is stuck it is hard to detach themselves until they fight for freedom.

== Exhibitions ==
=== Solo exhibitions ===
1. 1986 Martha Araújo: Hábito/Habitante, Galeria do Centro Empresarial, Rio de Janeiro
2. 1994 Martha Araújo: Galeria de Arte Associação Cultural Brasil, United States, El Salvador, Brazil
3. 2002 Martha Araújo: Entrópicos, Pinacoteca da Universidade Federal de Alagoas, Maceió, Brazil
4. 2015 Martha Araújo: Hábito/Habitante, Galería PM8, Vigo, Spain
5. 2015 Martha Araújo: Para um corpo pleno de vazios, Galeria Jaqueline Martins, São Paulo

=== Group exhibitions ===
1. 2014 Artevida, organized by Adriano Pedrosa and Rodrigo Moura at the Escola de Artes Visuais do Parque Lage.
2. 2018 Moving Stones Kadist Art Foundation / Paris, Ile-de-France, France

== Collection ==
- Galeria do Centro Empresarial, Rio de Janeiro
- Galeria de Arte Associação Cultural Brasil, United States, El Salvador, Brazil
- Escola de Artes Visuais do Parque Lage
- Galería PM8, Vigo, Spain
- Pinacoteca da Universidade Federal de Alagoas, Maceió, Brazil
- Para um corpo pleno de vazios, Galeria Jaqueline Martins, São Paulo
- Paris, Ile-de-France

== Honors and awards ==
In 1986 Araújo was granted an award at the tenth Solão Carioca de Artes in Rio de Janeiro.

== Bibliography ==
- Araújo, Martha, and Manuela Moscoso. Martha Araújo: Para um corpo pleno de vazios. São Paulo: Galeria Jaqueline Martins, 2015.
- Molina, Camila. "Artista Martha Araújo vive o resgate de sua obra performática." O Estado de São Paulo, February 15, 2015.
- Munder, Heike, ed. Resistance Performed: An Anthology on Aesthetic Strategies under Repressive Regimes in Latin America. Zurich: Migros Museum für
- Gegenwartskunst, 2015.
- Pedrosa, Adriano, ed. Artevida. Vol. 1. São Paulo: Cobogó, 2015.
