= Martha Wright =

Martha Wright may refer to:

- Martha Coffin Wright (1806–1875), American feminist, abolitionist, and signatory of the Declaration of Sentiments
- Martha Wright (actress) (1926–2016), American Broadway- and television actress and singer
- Martha Wright Griffiths (1912–2003), American lawyer and judge
