= Martha Biilmann =

Furrier/consultant/teacher

- Born: 1921
- Died: 2008 (aged 86–87); Maniitsoq
- Occupations: Furrier and educator

Martha Biilmann (1921-2008) was a Greenlandic furrier known for her expertise in animal skins and their care. She worked as a consultant for the government of Greenland and a teacher in several institutions. Throughout her career, she promoted awareness and education about traditional methods of working with sealskin. In 1990, Biilmann published Amminik Suleriaaseq, a guide to sealskin.

In recognition of her work, Biilmann was awarded the Danish Medal of Merit and Greenlandic Nersornaat. She also received the Greenlandic Culture Prize in 1988.
