= Martha Holmes =

Martha Holmes may refer to:

- Martha Holmes (photographer) (1923–2006), American photographer and photojournalist
- Martha Holmes (broadcaster), British BBC TV journalist, known for her underwater movies
