= Martha Poe Dogtrot House =

Historic house in Georgia, United States

- U.S. National Register of Historic Places
- Location within Georgia Location within the United States
- Location: 0.75 W of jct of Twelve Mile Post Rd. and GA 19, near Metcalf, Georgia
- Coordinates: 30.69124°N 83.84932°W
- Area: 5 acres (2.0 ha)
- Built: c.1850-1876
- Architectural style: Dogtrot
- NRHP reference No.: 98000569
- Added to NRHP: May 20, 1998; 28 years ago

The Martha Poe Dogtrot House, also known as Mayhar Plantation Stage Stop, in Thomas County, Georgia near Metcalf, Georgia, was built c.1850-1876. It is a dog trot house which is believed to have served as a stage stop.

It was built with two hewn log pens covered by a single roof, with a breezeway space in between, but the breezeway was later enclosed.

The house with four acres of land was bought in 1876 by Martha Poe, an African-American woman, from William Vaughn for $24. She later purchased an additional acre for $5.

The property was absorbed, along with others, into Mayhaw Plantation, created in 1946 as a hunting and shooting preserve which had an area of 4,000 acres (16 km^{2}) in 1998. Modifications in c.1946 added two brick chimneys to the two ends of the house, replaced flooring, and added a frame storage barn.
