= Connie Hagar =

American birdwatcher and naturalist

- Connie Hagar from a 1956 magazine
- Born: 14 June 1886; Corsicana, Texas, USA
- Died: 24 November 1973 (aged 87)
- Occupation(s): Bird watcher, naturalist

Martha Conger Neblett Hagar (June 14, 1886 – November 24, 1973), known as Connie Hagar, was an American birdwatcher and naturalist whose observations were valued by professional ornithologists, particularly her early observations of hummingbirds on the Texas coast.

== Childhood and personal life ==
Born Martha Conger Neblett in Corsicana, Texas, Hagar was the first of three children born to Robert Scott and Mattie Yeater Neblett. Her father was mayor at the time of her birth and was by profession a lawyer, and her mother was the daughter of Reverend A.J. Yeater. At home, the children learned to play piano, enjoyed reading, and history. Their home in Corsicana was a three-story pillared white house with fourteen rooms, six halls, and two verandas, with fine woodwork, linens, and silver.

After graduating from high school in 1903, Hagar attended Forest Park College, a girls' school in St. Louis emphasizing music and literature. Hagar married her childhood sweetheart Lynn Brooks, who worked for Southern Pacific Railroad, and moved to Ennis, Texas. During this time, she discovered she was going blind and was prescribed a dietary supplement of malted milk with an egg, which cured her sight problems. During her marriage to Lynn Brooks, the couple moved to New Orleans, but after 14 years of marriage at the age of 35 Hagar went home to take care of her ill mother. On her journey home, she met oil man and realtor Jack Hagar, who courted her for five years, during which time Hagar began watching birds in her yard. They married on April 2, 1926. In 1940, Hagar experienced vision problems and was diagnosed with cataracts that the doctor attributed to malnutrition; he prescribed Hagar three beers a day to hydrate her and provide nutrition. Her vision improved and she continued the habit of drinking three beers a day for the rest of her life.

Hagar made presentations to schoolchildren and clubs about numerous subjects, including shells, butterflies, stars, trees and wildflowers, and reptiles and amphibians. She was a lifelong piano player who, although not a member of the church, played accompaniment at the Aransas Pass Christian Science Church.

== Birdwatching ==
Hagar began birdwatching after returning to Corsicana at the age of 35. She and her sister Bert began Nature Club in January 1923, with eighteen members, affiliated with the National Audubon Society and the Texas Federation of Women's Clubs. After marrying Jack Hagar, she became more serious and volunteered for a bird-banding effort promoted in a magazine article. She wrote an article for the ornithological journal Wilson Bulletin on the nesting habits of red-winged blackbirds.

In 1928, she began her "Nature Calendar," a journal of observations that she would end up keeping for more than thirty-five years with very few breaks.

In 1933, Hagar visited Aransas Bay for the first time with her sister Bert. In 1935, after numerous visits to Rockport as well as birdwatching at High Island with friends, Connie and Jack Hagar moved to Rockport as the new owners of the Rockport Cottages, a tourist motel on eleven acres of land. In 1936, Hagar published a five-column article in the San Antonio Express-News under the headline "Texas Gulf Coast is Haven for Bird Life." Hagar's notes on migrants caught the attention of Harry C. Oberholser, who questioned her identifications of species who he believed were outside their breeding ranges. After corresponding over several sightings, Oberholser visited Hagar in 1937 and subjected her to a lengthy bird identification quiz. After she proved her competence at identifying birds, Obersholser had faith in her observations. The two had an ongoing correspondence, and Oberholser visited several more times over the years. He recommended Connie and Jack (despite Jack's lack of interest in birds) to the American Ornithologists' Union (AOU).

Over the years, Hagar and her husband hosted numerous birdwatchers and naturalists who accompanied Hagar on her rounds: Roy Bedichek, Guy Emerson, Dr. Dillon Ripley, Richard Pough, Edwin Teale, Burt Monroe, Ludlow Griscom, Dr. Arthur Augustus Allen, John W. Aldrich, Dorothy E. "Dot" Snyder (curator at the Peabody Museum), Ivan Sanderson, J. Frank Dobie, and Roger Tory Peterson who visited for the first time in 1948 and sought Hagar's assistance regarding details for his Texas field guide. Hagar published bird accounts in journals and bulletins, and contributed to local newspaper columns including her own columns in local papers. She published a checklist of the birds of the central coast of Texas in 1962.

Alfred Eisenstaedt photographed Hagar in the field for a September 10, 1956 feature titled "An Eminent Company of Amateur Naturalists" in Life Magazine, he worried that her silk dress would detract from her authenticity. In 1962, the National Audubon Society annual meeting was held in Corpus Christi so that Hagar would be able to attend and receive a special award for her achievements in ornithology and conservation.

== Death and legacy ==
Hagar's health problems became numerous in the late 1960s and in 1971 she was put in a nursing home, where she died in 1973. She was buried in the Rockport Cemetery, overlooking the Connie Hagar Wildlife Sanctuary. Two sanctuaries bear her name: the Connie Hagar Wildlife Sanctuary on the shoreline of Little Bay, and the six acre Connie Hagar Cottage Sanctuary in Rockport at the site of the cottages that she and Jack owned. Peterson unveiled the first trail sign along the Great Texas Coastal Birding Trail in 1994 at the Connie Hagar Cottage Sanctuary.
