= Martha McMillan Roberts =

American photographer

Martha McMillan Roberts (1919-1992) was an American photographer.

Her work is included in the collections of the Museum of Fine Arts Houston and the Los Angeles County Museum of Art.
