= Martha Nelson =

Martha Nelson may refer to:

- Martha Nelson-Grant (born 1954), Canadian Olympic swimmer
- Martha Nelson Thomas (1950–2013), American folk artist
