= Martha Mitchell (disambiguation) =

Martha Mitchell may refer to:

== People ==
- Martha Mitchell (1918-1976), wife of John N. Mitchell, United States Attorney General under President Richard Nixon
- Martha Reed Mitchell (1818-1902), American philanthropist and socialite
- Martha Mitchell (author) (died 2011), American librarian and archivist
- Martha Mitchell (director), American television director

== Other ==
- Martha Mitchell effect, process by which a medical professional labels a patient's accurate perception of real events as delusional
