= Martha Qorro =

Linguist

Martha A. S. Qorro (pronunciation: /KORroʊ/, KORro) was a linguist and an associate professor at the Centre for Communication Studies of the University of Dar es Salaam, known for her research into the use of the Kiswahili language as preferable language of instruction in Tanzania, and the Iraqw language. She died in May 2025.

She obtained her doctoral degree in 1999 at the University of Dar es Salaam with the thesis A qualitative study of the teaching and learning of writing of English in Tanzania secondary school in relation to the writing requirements of tertiary education. Before working at the University of Dar es Salaam since 1983, Qorro was a teacher of English and Kiswahili in Tanzanian secondary education. She lectures and performs research on language education and policy, while playing a role in the societal debate on language teaching and the choice of language of instruction in education.

== Publications ==
Qorro published many scholarly articles and books, including:

- with Zaline M. Roy-Campbell: Language crisis in Tanzania : the myth of English versus education. Mkuki Na Nyota Publishers, Dar es Salaam, Tanzania, 1997.
- with Maarten Mous and Roland Kiessling: Iraqw-English dictionary : with an English and a thesaurus index. Rüdiger Köppe, Köln, 2002.
- Davidson, Euan (July 2004). "Language of instruction in Tanzania and South Africa". International Journal of Educational Development. 24 (4): 451. doi:10.1016/j.ijedudev.2004.01.008.
- with Zubeida Desai and Birgit Brock-Utne (Eds): Educational challenges in multilingual societies : LOITASA phase two research. African Minds, [South Africa], 2010.
- Qorro, Martha A. S. (2013). "Language of instruction in Tanzania: Why are research findings not heeded?". International Review of Education. 59 (1): 29–45. Bibcode:2013IREdu..59...29Q. doi:10.1007/s11159-013-9329-5. JSTOR 42636126.
- with Shemilis Mazengia, Esayas Desta, Wondimu Gaga Gashe, Josephat Maghway, and Fugich Wako: A unified standard orthography for Cushitic languages : (Ethiopia, Somalia, Djibouti, Eritrea, Kenya, & Tanzania) : Afar, Borana, Burji, Gede'o, Hadiyya, Iraqw, Kambata, Konso, Oromo, Saaho, Sidaama, Somali. Monograph Series No. 258 Year 2014. Centre for Advanced Studies of African Society (CASAS), Cape Town, South Africa, 2014.
- Language of instruction for public schools in Tanzania : the missing link between research and policy, HakiElimu, Dar es Salaam, 2017.
