= Leila (name) =

- Pronunciation: /ˈleɪlə/ Arabic: [ˈlajlaː,ˈleː-] Hebrew: [ˈlajla]
- Gender: Female

Origin
- Meaning: "Dusk" or "night"
- Region of origin: Middle East

Other names
- Related names: Lila, Layal

Leila (Arabic: لَيْلَى, Hebrew: לילה, Syriac: ܠܹܠܝܵܐ), also spelt Layla, is a feminine given name of Arabic origin. It is popular in the Middle East, including Arabic-speaking countries, Iran, Turkey, and Palestine, as well as the Nordic countries, India and the Anglosphere. In the Latin alphabet, the name is commonly spelled in multiple ways, including Leila, Layla, Laylah, Laila, Leyla, and Leylah.

Laila comes from the Arabic word layl (لَيْل), which means "night", or "dark".

The story of Qays and Layla or Layla and Majnun is based on the romantic poems of Qais Ibn Al-Mulawwah (Arabic: قيس بن الملوح) in 7th century Arabia, who was nicknamed Majnoon Layla (مجنون ليلى), Arabic for "madly in love with Layla", referring to his cousin Layla Al-Amiriah (ليلى العامرية). His poems are considered the paragon of unrequited chaste love. They later became a popular romance in medieval Iran, and use of the name spread accordingly. The name gained popularity further afield in the Persianate world such as Iran and Pakistan also amongst Turkic peoples and in the Balkans and India.

The Indian name Leela or Lila is of Sanskrit origin and related to Hindu religion and philosophy. The name in Sanskrit translates to "play" or "divine play". It can also mean "act of God". Leela is also associated with the Hindu goddess Durga. The concept of "Leela" is rooted in Hindu philosophy and cosmology. The most famous example is "Ramleela", related to Lord Ram and "Rasleela", related to Lord Krishna. Layla or Leila, although similar sounding to Leela, have no connection to the name and its origin. Leela/Lila is of Sanskrit origin, and Leila is of Arabic origin. The word "Leela" and "Leila" have different origins, meanings and cultural significance, though they are phonetically similar.

In the Nordic countries, Laila or Lajla is derived from the Sami name Láilá, the Sami variant of Helga which means "holy".

== People with this name ==
=== Laila ===
- DJ Laila (born 1978), Filipino radio and television presenter
- Laila Akhmetova (born 1954), Kazakh doctor of historical sciences
- Laila Ali (born 1977), boxer and daughter of Muhammad Ali
- Laila Ali Abdull Mohamed (born 1965), First Lady of the Maldives
- Laila Bagge (born 1972), Swedish manager and songwriter
- Laila Bērziņa (born 1965), Latvian politician
- Laila Bjurling (born 1947), Swedish politician
- Laila Bugaighis, Libyan physician and human rights activist
- Laila Edwards (born 2004), American ice hockey player
- Laila El Khalifa (better known as Leila K) (born 1971), Swedish singer and rapper
- Laila Ezzat (born 1935), Egyptian painter
- Laila Freivalds (born 1942), Swedish Social-Democrat
- Laila Garin (born 1978), Brazilian actress and singer
- Laila Harré (born 1966), New Zealand politician
- Laila Hirvisaari (1938–2021), Finnish author and writer
- Laila Ireland, American LGBTQ activist and non-commissioned military officer
- Laila Kinnunen (1939–2000), Finnish singer
- Laila Lalami (born 1968), Moroccan-American novelist and essayist
- Laila Mehdin (born 1980), Indian actress
- Laila Morse (born 1945), English actress
- Laila Pakalniņa (born 1962), Latvian director
- Laila Phelia (born 2002), American basketball player
- Laila Smith (born 2006), American singer
- Laila Soueif (born 1956), Egyptian human and women's rights activist
- Laila Stien (born 1946), Norwegian writer
- Laila Wasti (born 1977), Pakistani actress and director
- Laila Woozeer, British author and activist

=== Layla ===
- DJ Layla, a Romanian music project
- Layla al-Akhyaliyya, 8th-century Umayyad Arab poet
- Layla Andrews (born 1997), English painter
- Layla Balabakki (1934–2023), Lebanese writer and activist
- Layla El (born 1977), British wrestler, dancer, model, actress, and entrepreneur
- Layla Handbury (born 1982), Australian MC
- Layla Iskandar (born 2002), Lebanese footballer
- Layla Kayleigh (born 1986), host on the US television program, Attack of the Show!
- Layla Kaylif (born 1971), British Emirati singer
- Layla McCarter (born 1979), American boxer
- Layla Moran (born 1982), British Liberal Democrat politician
- Layla Palmer, singer and keyboardist for the band Amity Lane
- Layla Taj, American-Egyptian dancer
- MC Layla (born 1982), Australian rapper
- Sultana Yesmin Layla (born 1993), Bangladeshi singer

=== Laylah ===
- Laylah Ali (born 1968), American visual artist
- Laylah Ali Othman (born 1986), Nigerian businesswoman

=== Leila ===
- Leila Abashidze (1929–2018), Georgian actress
- Leila Aboulela (born 1964), Sudanese writer
- Leila Ahmed (born 1940), Egyptian-American professor
- Leila Al Solh (born 1946), Lebanese public figure
- Leila Anderson (born 1984), South African performance artist
- Leila Arab (born 1971), London-based musician of Persian descent
- Leila Barros (born 1971), Brazilian volleyball player
- Leila Beaudoin (born 1996), Canadian boxer
- Leila Bela (born 1970), Iranian-American musician, actress, and writer
- Leïla Ben Ali (born 1956), Tunisian political figure
- Leila Ben-Gacem (born 1969), Tunisian social entrepreneur
- Leila Bolukat, Iranian actress
- Leila Bordreuil, French-American experimental musician
- Leila Borjali, Iranian karateka
- Leila Boucetta (born 1986), Algerian table tennis player
- Leila Bozorg, American public servant
- Leïla Chaibi (born 1982), French politician
- Leila de Lima (born 1959), Filipino human rights activist
- Leila Denmark (1898–2012), American pediatrician
- Leila Ernst (1920–1970), American actress
- Leila Esfandyari (1971–2011), Iranian mountain climber
- Leila Farzad (born 1981), British actress
- Leila Forouhar (born 1959), Iranian singer and actress
- Leila Goldkuhl (born 1991), American model
- Leila Hatami (born 1972), Iranian actress
- Leila Hayes (1940–2025), Australian actress
- Leila Herbert (1868–1897), American author
- Leila Hoteit (born 1974), Lebanese management consultant
- Leila Hyams (1905–1977), American film actress
- Leïla Jaffel (born 1960), Tunisian politician and jurist
- Leila Josefowicz (born 1977), American violinist
- Leila Kasra (1939–1989), Iranian poet and lyricist
- Leila Khaled (born 1944), Palestinian hijacker and PFLP member
- Leila Khan (actress), British actress
- Leila Khan, Pakistani politician
- Leila Lopes (actress) (1959–2009), Brazilian actress, journalist and television presenter
- Leila Lopes (born 1986), Miss Universe 2011 from Angola
- Leila Luik (born 1985), Estonian long-distance runner
- Leila Mardanshina (1927–2017), Soviet and Russian gas and oil operator
- Leïla Marouane (1960–2026), Tunisian-born French Algerian journalist and writer
- Leila McKinnon, Iranian-Australian journalist
- Leila Mimmack (born 1993), English actress
- Leila Mourad (1918–1995), Egyptian singer and movie star
- Leila Negra (1930–2025), Afro-German singer and actress
- Leila Ouahabi (born 1993), Spanish footballer
- Leila Pahlavi (1970–2001), Princess of Iran
- Leila Pärtelpoeg (1927–2025), Estonian interior architect and pedagog
- Leila Säälik (born 1941), Estonian actress
- Leila Shahid (1949–2026), Palestinian diplomat
- Leïla Slimani (born 1981), French-Moroccan writer and journalist
- Leila Sobral (born 1974), Brazilian basketball player
- Leila Stockmarr (born 1982), Danish politician
- Leila Tong (born 1981), Hong Kong actress and singer
- Leila Vaziri (born 1985), Iranian-American swimmer, world record holder
- Leila Waddell (1880–1932), mistress of British occultist Aleister Crowley

=== Leilah ===
- Leïla Sy (born 1977), French film director
- Leilah Assunção (born 1943), Brazilian dramatist, actress, and writer
- Leilah Mahi (1890–1932), French writer
- Leilah Nadir, Canadian writer
- Leilah Weinraub (born 1979), American filmmaker and conceptual artist

=== Lejla ===
- Lejla Agolli (born 1950), Albanian composer
- Lejla Basic (born 1994), Swedish footballer
- Lejla Hot (born 1986), Serbian pop singer, musician, and songwriter
- Lejla Kalamujić (born 1980), queer writer from Bosnia and Herzegovina
- Lejla Tanović (born 1994), Bosnian mountain bike racer

=== Lelia ===
- Lelia N. Morris (1862–1929), American hymnwriter

=== Leyla ===
- Leyla Achba (1898–1931), princess at the Ottoman Empire court
- Leyla Bağcı (born 1990), Turkish-Dutch footballer
- Leyla Chihuán (born 1975), Peruvian volleyball player
- Leyla Gencer (1928–2008), Turkish soprano opera singer
- Leyla Güngör (born 1993), Turkish-Swedish footballer
- Leyla Kazim (born 1985), British food and travel writer and media personality
- Leyla Mamedbekova (1921–2006), Azerbaijani pathologist
- Leyla Mammadbeyova (1909–1989), the first female Azerbaijani aviator
- Leyla Milani (born 1982), Canadian model of Iranian descent
- Leyla Neyzi (born 1961), Turkish academic
- Leyla Öztürk (born 1991), Turkish hockey player
- Leyla Pınar, Turkish harpsichordist and musicologist
- Leyla Qasim (1952–1974), Kurdish activist in Iraq
- Leyla Saz (1850–1936), composer, poet, and writer of Cretan Turkish descent
- Leyla Soleymani, Canadian scientist
- Leyla Tanlar (born 1997), Turkish actress
- Leyla Tuğutlu (born 1989), Turkish beauty queen
- Leyla Vakilova (1927–1999), Azerbaijani ballerina
- Leyla Yeniay Köseoğlu (1926–2002), Turkish politician
- Leyla Zana (born 1961), Kurdish politician from Turkey

=== Leylah ===
- Leylah Alliët (born 1991), Belgian beauty pageant titleholder
- Leylah Fernandez (born 2002), Canadian tennis player

== Fictional and mythological characters ==
- Laila from Laila in Haifa
- Laila Lewin in the book series The Wheel of Time
- Laila, character portrayed by Sunny Leone in item song "Laila Main Laila" from Raees
- Lailah, an angel of the night in Jewish mythology
- Layla El-Faouly / Scarlet Scarab in the Marvel Cinematic Universe TV show Moon Knight
- Layla Hamilton in the Japanese manga series Kaleido Star
- Layla Hassan, character in the Assassin's Creed video game series
- Layla Heartfilia in the Japanese manga series Fairy Tail
- Layla in the 1st Story Maxi CD 「Seisen no Iberia / 聖戦のイベリア」 of Sound Horizon
- Layla in the animated series Winx Club
- Layla in the classic Arabic love story Layla and Majnun
- Layla in the Japanese manga Black Butler/Kuroshitsuji, first introduced in chapter 172
- Layla M. Luzhkova (Note: "Leyla M. Ruzhkova in Funimation.) in the Japanese anime series Sakura Wars the Animation
- Layla Miller in the Marvel universe
- Layla Serizawa in the Japanese manga series NANA
- Layla, a character in 2020 video game Genshin Impact
- Layla, from series 3-5 of The Story of Tracy Beaker, portrayed by Cara Readle
- Leela (Doctor Who), a companion of the Fourth Doctor (1977–78)
- Leela in the animated TV show Futurama
- Leela Lomax, a character in soap opera Hollyoaks
- Leila Dalton, protagonist of the Night Prince novels by Jeaniene Frost
- Leila Hosnani, mother of Nessim (and Narouz) Hosnani, in Lawrence Durrell's The Alexandria Quartet
- Leila Kwan Zimmer, a character in the Netflix series Grand Army
- Leila Organa or Principessa Leila, Italian name of Princess Leia Organa, Star Wars character
- Leila Williams, a character in Fifty Shades Darker
- Leila, a daughter of the main character in the video game by Saber Interactive Inversion
- Leila, a playable character in Final Fantasy II
- Leïla, heroine of Bizet's opera Les Pecheurs de Perles (The Pearl Fishers), 1863
- Leyla Harding in the British soap opera Emmerdale
- Leyla Sancak in The Protector (Turkish TV series)
- Lilah Morgan in Angel (1999 TV series) TV show
- Lyla Garrity in the television series Friday Night Lights

== See also ==
- Leela (name)
- Leila (disambiguation)
- Lilith, name with the same etymological root
