= Laila (disambiguation) =

Laila is a feminine given name.

Laila may also refer to:

- Laíla (1943–2021), Brazilian carnival producer, composer and singer
- Laila (actress) (born 1980), Indian actress
- Laila (1927 film), an Egyptian silent drama film
- Laila (1929 film), a Norwegian silent drama film
- Laila (1937 film), a Swedish film directed by George Schnéevoigt
- Laila (1958 film), a German-Swedish film
- Laila (1984 film), an Indian Hindi film
- Laila (2025 film), an Indian Telugu film
- Laila (1997 film), a Maldivian drama film
- Laila (album), a 2008 album by Shahin Badar
- "Laila", a song by Vishal Mishra and Dhvani Bhanushali from the 2019 Indian film Notebook
- Laila, Dakshina Kannada, a village in Karnataka, India
- Laila Island or Perejil Island
- Cyclone Laila, a 2010 cyclone

== See also ==
- Leila (disambiguation)
- Layla (disambiguation)
- Leela (disambiguation)
- Lejla (disambiguation)
- Lelia (disambiguation)
- Lela (disambiguation)
- Layla and Majnun (disambiguation)
