= Leila =

Leila may refer to:

- Leila (name), a female given name, including a list of people with the name and its variants

== Books ==
- Leila; or, The Siege of Granada, 1838 historical romance novel by Edward Bulwer-Lytton
- Leila (novel), 2017 novel by Indian journalist Prayaag Akbar

== Film and television ==
- Leila (1997 film), an Iranian film
- Leïla (2001 film), a Danish film
- Leila (TV series), Indian television series

== Music ==
- Leila (music producer) or Leila Arab, Iranian musician now living in the United Kingdom
- "Leila" (song), a 1981 song by ZZ Top from El Loco
- "Leïla", a 1994 song by Lara Fabian from Carpe diem
- Leila, song by Indochine in the album L'aventurier
- Leila, song by Legião Urbana
- Leila, song by Miami Horror in the EP The Shapes
- Leila, song by Milton Nascimento

== Other uses ==
- Leila, Estonia, a village in Lääne-Nigula Parish, Lääne County, Estonia

== See also ==
- Laila (disambiguation)
- Layla (disambiguation)
- Leela (disambiguation)
- Lejla (disambiguation)
- Lelia (disambiguation)
- Lela (disambiguation)
- Leľa, a municipality in Slovakia
- Lila (disambiguation)
