= Ramleela (disambiguation) =

Ramleela is a Hindu re-enactment of the life of Rama.

Ramleela or Ram Leela may also refer to:

- Goliyon Ki Raasleela Ram-Leela, a 2013 Indian Hindi-language romantic-drama film by Sanjay Leela Bhansali
- Ramleela (2015 Kannada film), 2015
- Ram Leela (2015 Telugu film), 2015
- Ramaleela (2017 film), a 2017 Indian Malayalam-language political thriller film
- Ramleela – Ajay Devgn Ke Saath, a mythological musical drama television series

== See also ==
- Ramlila in Chandigarh
- Ramlila Maidan, place in Delhi, India
- Rama (disambiguation)
- Leela (disambiguation)
- Rasaleela (disambiguation)
- Krishna Leela (disambiguation)
- Manmadha Leelai (disambiguation)
