= Layla (disambiguation) =

"Layla" is a 1971 song by Derek and the Dominos.

Layla may also refer to:

- Layla (name), includes a list of people named Layla
- Layla (town), a town in Saudi Arabia
- Layla (film), a 2024 British romance film
- Layla El (born 1977), a retired professional wrestler known for her tenure in WWE
- Layla (video game), a 1986 video game for the Family Computer
- Layla (magazine), a magazine in Iraq
- "Layla" (DJ Robin & Schürze song), 2022 German song
- Layla (Winx Club), a character in Winx Club
- Layla bint Mahdi, Arab woman, known through the love story of Layla and Majnun

== See also ==
- Lailah (angel), angel in Jewish mythology
- Laila (disambiguation)
- Leela (disambiguation)
- Leila (disambiguation)
- Lelia (disambiguation)
- Lila (disambiguation)
- Layla and Majnun (disambiguation)
