= Rasaleela (disambiguation) =

Rasaleela may refer to:

- Raslila or Rasa, a dance story of the Hindu god Krishna
- Manipuri Rasa Leela, a classical Indian dance
- Raasaleela, a 1975 Indian Malayalam-language film starring Kamal Haasan and Jaya Sudha
- Rasaleela (2012 film), an Indian Malayalam-language film starring Darshan and Prathishta

== See also ==
- Rasa (disambiguation)
- Leela (disambiguation)
- Krishna Leela (disambiguation)
- Manmadha Leelai (disambiguation)
- Ramleela (disambiguation)
