= Laíla =

Brazilian composer (1943–2021)

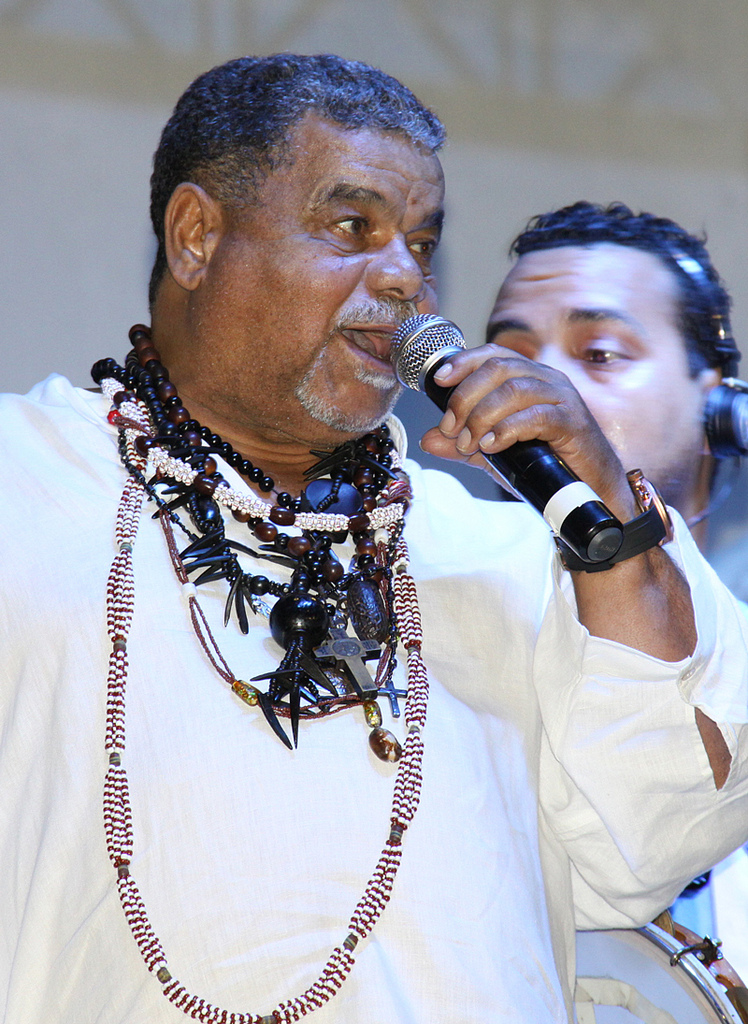
- Laíla in 2013
- Born: Luiz Fernando Ribeiro do Carmo; May 27, 1943; Rio de Janeiro, Brazil
- Died: June 18, 2021 (aged 78); Rio de Janeiro, Brazil
- Occupations: Carnival producer, director, and designer, samba-enredo composer and performer, samba school harmony director

Luiz Fernando Ribeiro do Carmo (May 27, 1943 – June 18, 2021), better known as Laíla, was a Brazilian carnival producer, director, and designer, as well as a composer and performer of samba-enredo, and a samba school harmony director. He is one of the greatest champions in the history of Rio de Janeiro Carnival, having won seventeen titles in the First Division, most of them as a member of Beija-Flor de Nilópolis, a school which, under his command, became known as the "steamroller" of the Sambadrome Marquês de Sapucaí.

== Biography ==
Luiz Fernando Ribeiro do Carmo, known as Laíla – a nickname from his childhood, when he could not pronounce the word "laranja" (orange) – was born in Tijuca, raised on the Morro do Salgueiro, and, having been orphaned of his mother at a young age, devoted himself to samba from early on. At fourteen, he joined Salgueiro's composers' wing, assumed the school's carnival and harmony direction in 1968, and won four titles in the 1970s. In 1973, he received the Golden Standard Award as Highlight of the Year, an honor he would repeat in 1981 as Personality. In 1975, he created the fusion of samba-enredo, a practice consisting of combining excerpts from competing works – an innovation he would replicate in several other samba schools. Recognized as the greatest winner in the Carnival elite, he amassed seventeen titles in the First Division throughout his career, four with Salgueiro and thirteen with Beija-Flor.

In 1976, he transferred to Beija-Flor, where, alongside Joãosinho Trinta, he contributed to the tri-championship of 1976–1978. In 1980, he was champion simultaneously in Groups 1 and 2, directing Beija-Flor and Unidos da Tijuca. Between 1986 and 1988, he was in charge of the carnival at Grêmio Recreativo Guamaense Arco-Íris, in Belém, in a new partnership with Joãosinho Trinta. His return to Beija-Flor in 1989 marked the creation of the "Beggar Christ" image: after judicial censorship, he covered the statue with black plastic and a banner reading "Mesmo proibido, olhai por nós" (Even if forbidden, look upon us), an episode that became one of the most iconic in Carnival history. After a brief departure, in 1992 he had a short stint at Unidos do Peruche, in São Paulo; in 1992 and 1993, he worked at Grande Rio, being responsible for the fusion that resulted in the samba "No Mundo da Lua" and for the school's promotion to the Special Group.

During his long stint that began in 1995 and lasted 23 years, Laíla abolished the figure of the single carnival designer and instituted a carnival commission – comprising Cid Carvalho, Fran Sérgio, Amarildo de Mello, and others – turning Beija-Flor into the "steamroller" of Sapucaí, renowned for harmonic precision and flawless evolution. He innovated by introducing lyric choirs and classical instruments on the avenue, repositioned the master-sala and porta-bandeira couple (a model later universalized), and, in 2017, experimented with thematic blocks instead of wings. Concurrently, for over three decades, he produced the official samba-enredo records and collaborated with TV Globo as a commentator, contributing to the dissemination and professionalization of Carnival. In 2014, he served as a consultant at Innocentes de Belford Roxo; in 2015, in the championship parade about Equatorial Guinea, he was honored with a tripé (float prop) bearing his features.

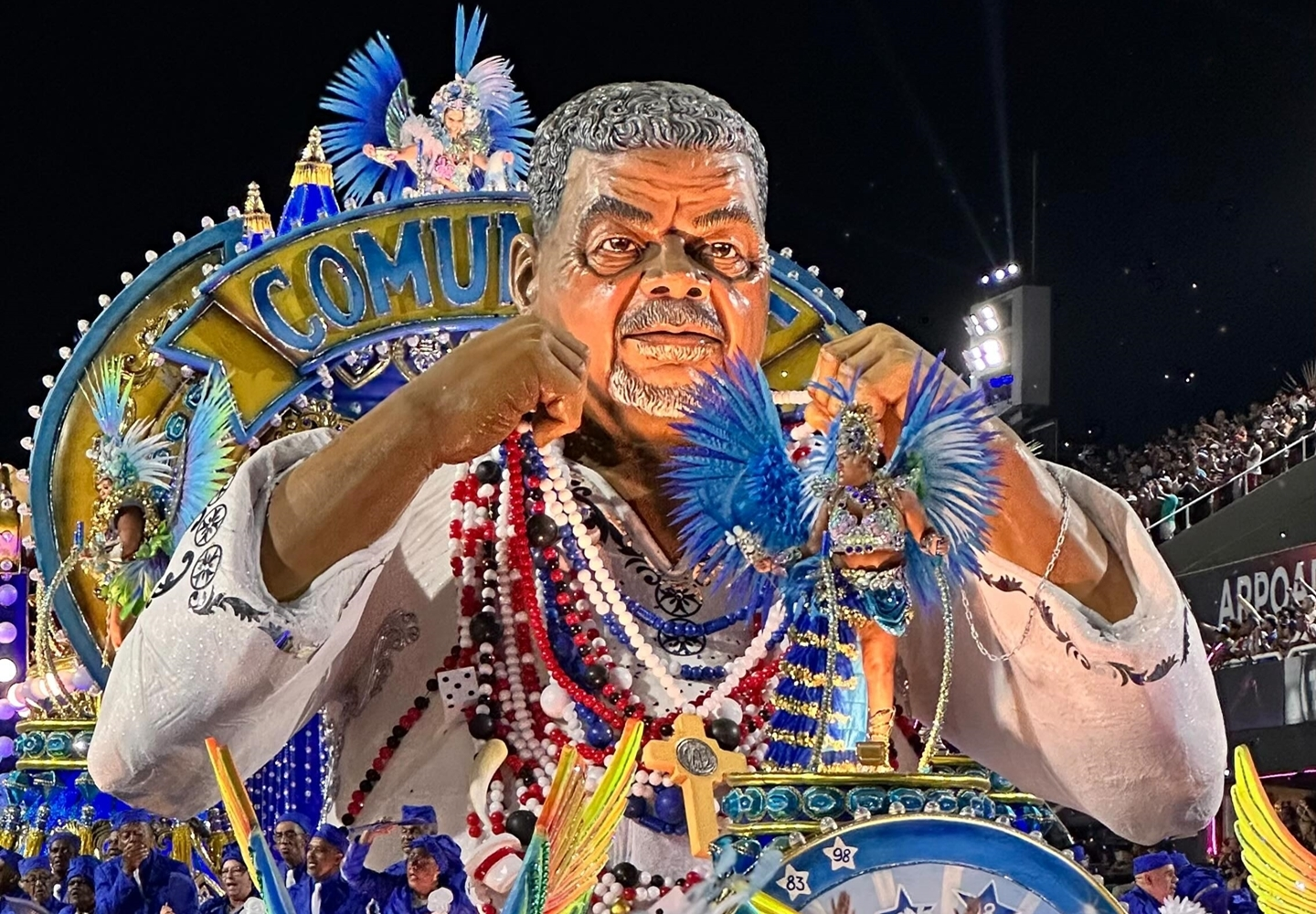
Sculpture of Laíla featured in Beija-Flor's winning float during the 2025 Rio Carnival parade.

His trajectory, however, was marked by internal tensions: in 2014, he protested against the judges and obtained the replacement of the evaluators and the abolition of the Conjunto (Overall Effect) category; in 2016, he denounced alleged favoritism toward Unidos da Tijuca with audio recordings that, although they prompted a police inquiry, were archived for lack of evidence. With the rise of heir Gabriel David, who introduced a more scenic and modernizing aesthetic – including the integration of the front commission with the mestre-sala and porta-bandeira couple in 2014 – Laíla lost creative space, culminating in his "amicable" departure from Beija-Flor in 2018. He briefly worked at Unidos da Tijuca, served at Águia de Ouro (São Paulo) in 2019, and in 2020, at União da Ilha do Governador, where he suffered the first relegation of his career, followed by public recriminations among his staff.

Laíla passed away in June 2021, a victim of complications from COVID-19. Among the personalities who mourned his death were the mayor of the city of Rio de Janeiro, Eduardo Paes, the governor of the state of Rio de Janeiro, Cláudio Castro, and the samba singer and composer Neguinho da Beija-Flor, who stated that Laíla was the "best carnival director of all time."
