= Rira =

Rira or RIRA may refer to:

== People ==
- Jang Ri-ra (born 1969), South Korean handball player
- Rira Kawashima (born 1996), Japanese badminton player
- Lilas Ikuta (Hepburn: Ikuta Rira; born 2000), Japanese singer and songwriter
- Rira Suzuki (born 1998), Japanese weightlifter

== Other uses ==
- Real Irish Republican Army, commonly abbreviated as RIRA
- Rira or Riras, a river said by Pliny the Elder to flow in eastern Thrace

== See also ==
- Lila (disambiguation)
- Lilas (disambiguation)
