= Leela (name) =

Leela or 'Lila' is a name of Sanskrit origin and related to Hindu religion and philosophy. Sanskrit word leela/lila can be translated as "play or divine play" (noun), as in the Hindu philosophical concept of leela between Radha and Krishna. It can also mean 'act of God'. Leela name is also associated with Hindu goddess Durga. The concept of 'lila' is rooted in Hindu philosophy and cosmology and describe the way God manifests in the world.

Notable people with the name include:

== Given name ==
- Leela Aheer (born 1970), Canadian politician
- Leela Bunce (born 1980), British media personality
- Leela Chitnis (1912–2003), Indian actress
- Leela Corman, American cartoonist
- Leela Desai (fl. 1937–1961), Indian actress
- Leela Devi (1932–1998), Indian writer
- Leela Devi Dookhun (born 1961), Mauritian cabinet minister
- Leela Dube (1923–2012), Indian anthropologist
- Leela Gandhi (born 1966), Indian-American academic
- Leela Gilday, Dene-Canadian singer
- Leela Grace (born 1977), American singer-songwriter
- Leela Hamid (born 1984), Maldivian volleyball player
- Leela Hazzah, Egyptian conservation biologist
- Leela James (born 1983), American singer-songwriter
- Leela Majumdar (1908–2007), Bengali writer
- Leela Damodara Menon (born 1923), Indian politician
- Leela Mishra (1908–1988), Indian actress
- Leela Naidu (1940–2009), Indian actress
- Leela Nambudiripad (1934–2021), Indian children's author
- Leela Omchery (born 1929), Indian singer and writer
- Leela Roy (1900–1970), Indian politician
- Leela Samson (born 1951), Indian dancer and writer
- Leela Savasta, Canadian actress
- Leela Soma, Indian-Scottish writer
- Leela Sumant Moolgaokar (1916–1992), Indian social worker
- Leela Varghese, Australian filmmaker, co-writer and director of Lesbian Space Princess (2025)

== Surname ==
- Chindodi Leela (1937–2010), Indian actress and politician
- Kulappulli Leela, Indian actress
- P. Leela (1934–2005), Indian playback singer

'Leela' could be associated with a variation of the Semitic name Leila which means "night" in both Arabic and Hebrew.

== See also ==
- Leela (disambiguation)
- Death of Leelah Alcorn (1997–2014), suicide of an American transgender girl
- Lela (disambiguation)
- Leila (name)
- Lila (given name)
