= Majnu (disambiguation) =

Majnu often refers to Qays Ibn al-Mulawwah, an Arab bedouin poet best known from Layla and Majnun, a tragic romance from classical Arabic.

Majnu or Majnun or Majnoon (transl. madman; lit. 'possessed by the jinn' in Arabic) may also refer to:

== People ==
- Majnun Gorakhpuri (1904–1988), Urdu poet
- Majnu Shah (died 1787), Indian freedom fighter
- Shams al Faransi, subject of the Arabic love story Marwa and al-Majnun al-Faransi
- Sagar Pandey "Majnu Bhai", a fictional criminal in the 2007 Indian film Welcome

== Films ==
- Majnu (1987 film), a 1987 Indian Telugu-language film starring Akkineni Nagarjuna and Rajani
- Majunu, a 2001 Indian Tamil-language film by Ravichandran
- Majnu (2016 film), an Indian Telugu-language film starring Nani
- Majnun (film), a 2016 Uzbek film
- Mr. Majnu, a 2019 Indian Telugu-language romantic comedy film by Venky Atluri
- Mission Majnu, a 2023 Indian spy-thriller film by Shantanu Bagchi
- Majnu (2022 film), an Indian Marathi-language drama film by Shivaji Doltade

== Places ==
- Majnun, Iran (disambiguation)
- Majnu-ka-tilla (lit. 'madman's hill'), neighborhood in North Delhi, India
- Majnoon Island, Iraq
  - Majnoon oil field

== See also ==
- Layla and Majnun (disambiguation)
- Junoon (disambiguation), Arabic for being possessed by the jinn
- Jinn (disambiguation)
