= Sri Krishna Leela =

Sri Krishna Leela may refer to:

- Raslila, divine dance in Hinduism of the deity Krishna with his consort Radha and other cowherd gopis
- Shri Krishna Leela, 1971 Hindi film
- Sri Krishna Leela, 1977 Tamil film
- Sri Krishna Leela Tarangini, Sanskrit opera

== See also ==
- Krishna Leela (disambiguation)
