= Lila =

Lila or LILA may refer to:

== People ==
- Lila (given name), a female given name (including a list of people with the name)

== Arts and entertainment ==
- Lila (album), debut album by American country music singer Lila McCann
- Lila (movie), a 1968 sexploitation film
- Who's Lila?, a 2022 horror video game
- "Lila", an abstract work of art by Fernando De Szyszlo

=== Literature ===
- Lila (Robinson novel), a novel by Marilynne Robinson
- Lila: An Inquiry into Morals, a book by Robert Pirsig
- The Meaning of Lila, a comic strip written by John Forgetta and L. A. Rose
- Līlāvatī, mathematical treatise by 12th-century Indian mathematician Bhaskara II, named after his daughter
- Lilavati's Daughters, biographical dictionary of Indian women scientists
- Līlāvatīsāra, Indian poetry collection

== Religion ==
- Lila (Hinduism), an Indic concept of the universe as a playground of the divine
- Leela attitude, an attitude of walking Buddha in Thai art

== Other uses ==
- Lila, a name misunderstood to be a nickname of the trans-Neptunian object 136199 Eris
- Lila, Bohol, a municipality in the Philippines
- Lycée International de Los Angeles, a private French school in Los Angeles
- Leelavati Award, award for Indian women mathematicians, named after the Līlāvatī treatise
- Lila (cannon), a type of Malay cannon

== See also ==
- Lilla (disambiguation)
- Lilac (disambiguation)
- Lilas (disambiguation)
- Layla (disambiguation)
- Leila (disambiguation)
- Leela (disambiguation)
- Lelia (disambiguation)
- Lilan (disambiguation)
- Rira (disambiguation)
