= Maldarelli =

Maldarelli is a surname. Notable people with the surname include:

- Federico Maldarelli (1826–1893), Italian painter
- Gennaro Maldarelli (c.1796–1858), Italian painter
- Oronzio Maldarelli (1892–1963), American sculptor and painter
