= Lilan =

Lilan may refer to:

- Lilan, a minor character in the video game Suikoden IV
- Lilan, East Azerbaijan, a village in Hamadan Province, Iran
- Lilan, Hamadan, a village in Hamadan Province, Iran
- Lilan, Markazi, a village in Markazi Province, Iran

== See also ==
- Leela (disambiguation)
- Lila (disambiguation)
- Leelan Express, a passenger train in India
