= Lilla (disambiguation) =

Lilla is a given name and surname.

Lilla may also refer to:

- Lilla, Jhelum, a village in Punjab, Pakistan
- Lilla Karlsö, a Swedish island in the Baltic Sea
- Lilla Edet, a locality in Västra Götaland County, Sweden
- Lilla Bommen, a skyscraper in the Lilla Bommen district of Gothenburg, Sweden
- Lilla, 2026 studio album by Ella Augusta

== See also ==
- Lila (disambiguation)
