= Manmadha Leelai =

Manmadha Leelai (lit. 'divine dance of Manmadha/Kamadeva') may refer to:

- Manmadha Leelai (1976 film), an Indian Tamil-language romantic comedy film
- Manmadha Leelai (2022 film), an Indian Tamil-language adult black comedy thriller film

== See also ==
- Manmadhan (disambiguation)
- Leela (disambiguation)
- Ramleela (disambiguation)
- Krishna Leela (disambiguation)
