= Junoon =

Junoon (transl. passion; lit. 'jinn possession' in Arabic) may refer to:

== Film ==
- Junoon (1978 film), a Hindi film by Shyam Benegal
- Junoon (1992 film), a Hindi horror film by Mahesh Bhatt
- Junoon (2002 film), a Bollywood film of 2002

== Music ==
- Junoon (Abhijeet Sawant album), 2007
- Junoon (band), a Pakistani rock band
- Junoon (Junoon album), 1991 self-titled album by the band

== Television ==
- Junoon (1994 TV series), a Doordarshan television series
- Junoon (2008 TV series), a NDTV Imagine television series
- Junoon – Aisi Nafrat Toh Kaisa Ishq, an Indian TV series

== See also ==
- Junun (disambiguation)
- Majnu (disambiguation)
- Jinn (disambiguation)
- Junooniyat, a 2016 Indian film by Vivek Agnihotri
- Junooniyatt, an Indian musical drama television series
