= Majnun, Iran =

Majnun or Majnoon (Persian: مجنون) may refer to:

- Majnun, Bushehr
- Majnun, Khuzestan
- Majnun-e Olya, West Azerbaijan Province
- Majnun-e Sofla, West Azerbaijan Province
