= Ramlila in Chandigarh =

Ramlila in Chandigarh is one of the most important cultural events of Chandigarh. Ramlila is regarded as dramatic folk re-enactment of the life of Lord Rama. In Chandigarh, there are almost 60 places where Ramlila is being celebrated, out of which 40 are registered. There is committee named Chandigarh Kendriya Ramleela Mahasabha that connects all the city based 60 Ramlila event together by holding a three days competition between them. The Ramleela begin from the Amavasya to dashmi tithi of Ashwin month of Hindi Calendar. Navyug Ramlila and Dussehra Committee sector 7, Garhwal Ramleela Mandal, Bijali Board, Sector28, Chandigarh Ramleela committee sector-22B are few noted ones because Out of the forty, these three are oldest and each Ramlila pull the crowd of more than 10,000 people.
