= Lila (given name) =

Lila is a feminine given name.

== People with the given name Lila ==
- Lila Avilés (born 1982), Mexican film director, screenwriter, actress and producer
- Lila Cockrell (1922–2019), American politician
- Lila Downs (born 1968), Mexican singer
- Lila Fenwick (1932–2020), American lawyer, human rights advocate, and United Nations official
- Lila Iké (born 1994), Jamaican reggae singer and songwriter
- Lila Kari, Romanian and Canadian computer scientist and professor
- Lila Karp (1933–2008), American writer and activist
- Lila Katzen (1925–1998), American sculptor
- Lila Kedrova (1909–2000), French actress
- Lila Lamgade (born 1991), Nepalese footballer
- Lila Lee (1905–1973), American actress
- Lila Leeds (1928–1999), American actress
- Lila Abu-Lughod (born 1952), Palestinian-American anthropologist
- Lila Majumdar (1908–2007), Bengali writer, also referred to as Leela Majumdar
- Lila McCann (born 1981), American country music singer
- Lila Morillo (born 1940), Venezuelan actress and singer
- Lila Neuenfelt (1902–1981), American lawyer and judge
- Lila Nikole Rivera (born 1979), American costume designer
- Lila Rose (born 1988), American anti-abortion activist
- Lila Diane Sawyer (born 1945), news anchor
- Lila Shanley (1909–1996), American stuntwoman, stunt double, actress, and athlete
- Lila Tretikov (born 1978), executive director of the Wikimedia Foundation 2014–2016
- Lila York (born 1948), American dancer and choreographer
- Lila Azam Zanganeh, French-Iranian writer
- Leela Naidu (1940–2009), an Indian actress, also referred to as Lila

=== Fictional people ===
- Lila, a fictional character in 2018 TV series Bluey
- Lila, character in both the 1972 and 2007 American romantic dark comedy, The Heartbreak Kid
- Lila, character in the 2022 American slasher film, Texas Chainsaw Massacre (2022)
- Lila, titular character in the 2022 horror video game, Who's Lila?
- Lila (Xena), a recurring character in the television series Xena: Warrior Princess
- Lila Bard, from a Darker Shade of Magic by V. E. Schwab
- Lila Black, the main heroine of Quantum Gravity novel series by Justina Robson
- Lila Cerullo (pronounced ‘Lee-la’), a character in Elena Ferrante's Neapolitan Novels and their television adaptation My Brilliant Friend
- Lila Cheney, a character in Marvel Comics
- Lila Crane, main character in Alfred Hitchcock's film Psycho
- Lila Fowler, a character in the book series Sweet Valley High
- Lila Pitts, character from The Umbrella Academy since season 2
- Lila Quartermaine, a character on the daytime television series General Hospital
- Lila Rossi, a character in the animated series Miraculous: Tales of Ladybug & Cat Noir
- Lila Rupert, character in 2024 American action science fiction thriller film, Agent Recon
- Lila Sawyer, a character from the animated television series Hey Arnold
- Lila Test, a character from the animated television series Johnny Test
- Lila West, alias Lila Tournay, a character in the TV serial Dexter (season 2)

== See also ==
- Leela (name)
- Lila (disambiguation)
- Lilla
- Leila (name)
- Leelavathi
