= Layla and Majnun (disambiguation) =

Layla and Majnun is a classical Arabic story.

Layla and Majnun, Leyli and Majnun, or Laila Majnu may also refer to:

== Literature ==
- "Layla and Majnun" (Nizami Ganjavi poem), a 12th-century poem by Nizami Ganjavi
- "Layla and Majnun", a 15th-century poem by Jami
- "Layla and Majnun", a 15th-century poem by Ali-Shir Nava'i
- Leyli and Majnun (Fuzuli), a 15th–16th-century poem by Fuzûlî
- "Layla and Majnun", a poem by Hagiri Tabrizi; see Layla and Majnun § Azerbaijani adaptation and Azerbaijani literature

== Music ==
- Leyli and Majnun (opera), a 1908 Azerbaijani opera by Uzeyir Hajibeyov
- Leyli and Majnun, a 1947 symphonic poem by Gara Garayev
- Leyli and Majnun (ballet), a 1969 Azerbaijani ballet by Gara Garayev

== Films ==
- Laila Majnu (1922 film), an Indian Hindi silent film with Patience Cooper
- Laila Majnu (1927 film), a 1927 Indian Hindi silent film produced by Excelsior Pictures and directed by Manilal Joshi
- Laila Majnu (1931 Krishnatone film), a 1931 Indian Hindi film produced by Krishnatone and directed by K. Rathod
- Laila Majnu (1931 Madan film), a 1931 Indian Hindi film produced by Madan Theatres and directed by J. J. Madan
- Laila Majnun, a 1933 Indian Hindi film directed by B. S. Rajhans
- Layla and Majnun (1937 film), a 1937 Iranian film
- Laila Majnu (1949 film), an Indian Telugu film
- Laila Majnu (1950 film), an Indian Tamil film
- Laila Majnu (1953 film), a 1953 Indian Hindi film with Shammi Kapoor
- Layla and Majnun (1956 film), a 1956 film starring Mahvash
- Lela Manja, a 1960 Malay Film Productions film
- Laila Majnu (1962 film), an Indian Malayalam film
- Laila Majnu (1976 film), an Indian Hindi film
- Laila Majnu (2018 film), an Indian Hindi film by Imtiyaz Ali

== Other ==
- Laila Majnu Ki Mazar, mausoleum of Laila and Majnu, Binjaur village, Rajasthan, India
- Leyla and Mecnun, a Turkish comedy series
- Layla and Majnun, a Persian miniature painting by Mir Sayyid Ali

== See also ==
- Layla (disambiguation)
- Majnu (disambiguation)
- Majnun (disambiguation)
