= Neguinho da Beija-Flor =

Brazilian singer

Neguinho da Beija-Flor OMC
- Neguinho da Beija-Flor in 2007.
- Born: Luiz Antônio Feliciano Marcondes; June 29, 1949 (age 77); Nova Iguaçu, Rio de Janeiro, Brazil
- Other name: Neguinho da Beija-Flor
- Occupations: Singer and composer
- Years active: 1974–2025
- Musical career
- Genres: Samba; Samba-enredo
- Instruments: Vocals

Neguinho da Beija-Flor OMC, whose real name is Luiz Antônio Feliciano Marcondes, (born June 29, 1949 in Nova Iguaçu) is a samba singer and composer. He has been the official interpreter of the Beija-Flor since 1976.

He is the son of a musician. Owning both a powerful voice and great vocal technique, he debuted as lead-singer at the Samba Group Lion of Iguaçu in 1970, transferring to the musical group Beija-Flor (from Nilópolis/RJ), in 1975. There he created the slogan "Just feel the Beija-flor around, folks!".

He released his first album in 1980, which was followed by other ones, with hits such as the samba-theme "The Story of the Five Balls of Rio" (Silas de Oliveira / Dona Ivone Lara / Bacalhau), "Aquarela Brasileira (Silas de Oliveira), "Dreaming of King means Lion " (of his own) or samba-calções (slow sambas) like "Nervos de Aço" (Lupicinio Rodrigues). Other musical hits are "Ângela" (Serginho Meriti / Alexandre), "Divina" (Alexandre), "Magali", "Esmeralda" and "O Campeão" (the champ), his most successful composition, usually sung at soccer matches ("Next Sunday I''m gonna go to Maracanã / I'll root for the team I'm a fan"/ I'm gonna take fireworks and flags).

He easily won the award for 1991 in the category "best samba-theme singer."

In 2005 he released his first DVD, in the Cidade do Samba (City of Samba), with the presence of Sandra de Sá.

He married Elaine Ramos on February 23, 2009 in Sambadrome Marquês de Sapucaí shortly before singing in carnaval. The wedding was broadcast on network coverage of carnival.

In May 2011 he announced that he would run for mayor in Nova Iguaçu
