= Jette Gottlieb =

Danish politician (born 1948)

Member of the Folketing
- In office 5 June 2019 – 31 October 2024
- Constituency: Copenhagen
- In office 21 September 1994 – 20 November 2001
- Constituency: Østre

Personal details
- Born: 23 September 1948 (age 78) Copenhagen, Denmark
- Party: Red-Green Alliance (since 1988)
- Other political affiliations: Left Socialists (before 1988)

Jette Ryde Gottlieb (born 23 September 1948) is a Danish politician, who was a member of the Folketing for the Red-Green Alliance political party. She was first elected into parliament at the 1994 Danish general election, and served until the 2001 Danish general election She was elected to parliament again at the 2019 Danish general election and served until her voluntary retirement, in October 2024. She was replaced as a member of parliament by Leila Stockmarr, also a member of the Red-Green Alliance.

== Political career ==
Gottlieb has previously been a member of the Left Socialists. She was among the people who took part in founding the Red-Green Alliance in 1988–1989.

Gottlieb was first elected into parliament at the 1994 election, and was reelected in the 1998 election. She didn't run for parliament again at the 2001 election. She ran again in the 2015 election, where she was elected as a substitute member for the Red-Green Alliance in the Copenhagen constituency. She acted as substitute for Finn Sørensen from 17 April to 10 June in 2018. In the 2019 election she was elected into parliament for the Red-Green Alliance.

== Personal life ==
Gottlieb is a carpenter by trade.
