= Junun =

Junun may refer to:

- Junun (album), a 2015 album by Shye Ben Tzur, Jonny Greenwood, and the Rajasthan Express
- Junun (film), a 2015 documentary about the making of the album

== See also ==
- Junoon (disambiguation)
