= Lilla =

Lilla is a female given name, derived from Elizabeth.

== Given name ==
- Lilla Barzó - a Hungarian tennis player
- Lilla Bodor - a Hungarian painter
- Lilla Brignone - an Italian film and theater actress
- Lilla Cabot Perry - an American artist
- Lilla Crawford - an American actress
- Lilla Hansen - a Norwegian architect
- Lilla Maldura - an Italian artist
- Lilla Nagy- a Hungarian footballer
- Lilla Sipos - a Hungarian footballer
- Lilla Vincze - a Hungarian singer
- Lilla Watson - an indigenous Australian artist
- Lilla Zuckerman - an American television writer

== Surname ==
- Mark Lilla - an American political scientist.

== Nickname ==
- Iris Mary 'Lilla' Birtwistle, an English lyric poet and gallery owner

== See also ==
- Lila (given name)
