= Paul and Win Grace =

Paul and Win Grace, now known as Paul Fotsch and Win Grace, were a married duo of American folk musicians and old-time musicians based in Columbia, Missouri, USA. They released seven albums between 1984 and 2006 and toured extensively across North America. They performed with daughters Leela and Ellie Grace as The Grace Family until 1997. They also performed music of the Lewis and Clark voyage with Cathy Barton, Dave Para, and Bob Dyer, as the Discovery String Band.

The couple divorced in 2009. Paul continued to periodically perform as a solo artist until his untimely death on July 23, 2023. Win Grace plays accordion, guitar, autoharp, and piano. Paul Fotsch played fiddle, mandolin, guitar, and harmonica and had a warm, expressive singing voice.
