= Manmadhan (disambiguation) =

Manmadhan or Kamadeva is the Hindu god of love.

Manmadhan may refer to:

- Manmadhan (film), a 2004 Indian Tamil film starring Silambarasan and Jyothika
- Manmadhan Ambu, a 2010 Indian Tamil film starring Kamal Hassan, R. Madhavan and Trisha

== See also ==
- Kama (disambiguation)
- Manmadha Leelai (disambiguation)
- Manmadhudu, 2002 Indian Telugu-language film
  - Manmadhudu 2, 2019 sequel film by Rahul Ravindran
- Manmadan Ambu, 2010 Indian Tamil-language film
