= Layal (name) =

- Pronunciation: Arabic: [laˈjaːl]
- Gender: Female

Origin
- Language: Arabic
- Meaning: "Nights"
- Region of origin: Arab world, especially in the Levant

Other names
- Related names: Leila

Layal (Arabic: ليال, pronounced [laˈjaːl], lit. 'Nights'; plural of ليل layl or ليلة layla), sometimes romanized as Layale, is an Arabic feminine given name.

Notable people with the name include:

- Layal Abboud (born 1982), Lebanese singer
- Layale Chaker, French-Lebanese violinist and composer
- Layal Khawly, Lebanese visual artist
- Layal Najib (1983–2006), Lebanese photojournalist
- Layal Watfeh (born 1980), Syrian composer, musician, and voice actor

== See also ==
- Leila (name)
