= Majnun =

Majnun is Layla's lover in the 12th century Persian poem Layla and Majnun.

Majnun may also refer to:

== People ==
- Majnun (musician), Senegalese musician, performing with Dorcy Rugamba in his 2025 production Hewa Rwanda
- Majnun Gorakhpuri, pen name of Ahmad Siddiq (1904–1988), an Urdu writer and literary critic
- Majnun Mammadov (born 1983), an Azerbaijani politician

== Other uses ==
- Majnun, Iran (disambiguation), several places in Iran
- Majnun (film), a 2016 Uzbek melodrama directed by Johongir Ahmedov
