= Beija-Flor =

Samba school in Brazil

- Full name: Grêmio Recreativo Escola de Samba Beija-Flor
- Foundation: December 25, 1948; 76 years ago
- Blessing school: Portela
- Colors
- Symbol: Hummingbird
- Location: Centro, Nilópolis
- President: Almir Reis
Carnival staff
- Carnival producer: João Vitor Araújo
- Carnival singer: Neguinho da Beija-Flor
- Carnival director: Dudu Azevedo
- Harmony director: Válber Frutuoso; Simone Santana
- Director of Battery: Plínio and Rodnei
- Queen of Battery: Lorena Raíssa
- Mestre-sala and Porta-Bandeira: Claudinho and Selminha Sorriso
- Choreography: Jorge Teixeira and Saulo Finelon

The Grêmio Recreativo Escola de Samba Beija-Flor is a Samba school headquartered in the municipality of Nilópolis, Baixada Fluminense, in the state of Rio de Janeiro, Brazil.

In total, Beija-Flor has won 15 parades of the Carnaval do Rio de Janeiro; as general champion in 1976, 1977, 1978, 1980, 1983, 1998, 2003, 2004, 2005, 2007, 2008, 2011, 2015, 2018 and 2025. It was the overall runner-up and vice champion school in 1979, 1981, 1985, 1986, 1989, 1990, 1999, 2000, 2001, and 2002. With the departure of Joãosinho Trinta after the Carnaval of 1992, the school featured Maria Augusta and the young Milton Cunha as carnival producers. Only with the creation of the Carnaval Commission in 1998, could the school return to win championships. Nowadays, Beija-flor's Carnaval Commission.

== History ==
The Beija-Flor Samba School was formed on December 25, 1948, by a carnivalesque blocos of Nilópolis. The name was inspired by the ranch Beija-Flor that existed in the city of Marquês de Valença. The idea emerged from a group formed by Milton de Oliveira (Negão da Cuíca), Edson Vieira Rodrigues (Edinho do Ferro Velho), Helles Ferreira da Silva, Mário Silva, Walter da Silva, Hamilton Floriano, and José Fernandes da Silva. But it was the mother of Negão da Cuíca, Dona Eulália, that suggested the name of the school. Because of that, she became admitted as the founder of the school. Only in 1953, the bloco, that became victorious in the neighborhood, was renamed G.R.E.S. Beija-Flor de Nilópolis. The school then first paraded officially in 1954 for the Second Group, where it obtained first place.

The history of the school, that has as its symbol the hummingbird (which in Portuguese is called Beija-flor), could be divided into two part; before and after Joãosinho Trinta. Joãosinho Trinta took on the school in 1976 with the samba-enredo (plot) in honor to the jogo do bicho (illegal type of gambling in Brazil). The parades signed by him became so anthological that even when he did not win he left a mark in the avenue. That is what happened in 1989 when the school, known by its luxurious rows and floats, surprised the public with the plot Ratos e urubus, larguem a minha fantasia ("Rats and vultures, release my costume") bringing to the Sambódromo cars and rows full of trash, beside the famous covered Cristo Redentor. It was on that year that Beija-Flor became vice-champion, but Joãosinho was considered by some people the righteous champion of the parade..

During the 1990s, the school was always placed in the first places, being that in the period of 2003/05 it conquered its second trichampionship. In 2007 it won again, this time with a considerable difference of points from the second placed. Months after the Carnaval, the Brazilian Federal Police, during the Hurricane Operation, imprisoned, among others, the patron of the school, the bicheiro Anísio Abraão David, and also seized a large amount of money that, according to the official was responsible for the operation, would be used to buy judges for the parades and like that guarantee the victory of Beija-Flor. Later, a CPI (Parliamentary Commission of Inquiry) was installed in the City Council of city of Rio de Janeiro. It did not prove that the alleged kits were for only the voting maps and the police officer that affirmed such fraud refused to attend to testify in CPI.

For 2008, the Commission of Carnaval chose the theme "Macabapá: Equinócio Solar, viagem fantástica ao meio do mundo" and conquered its 11th title. after the carnival 2018, the school has lost one of its greatest mentors, Laíla who left the college, after not agreeing with the new model of carnival. The Members who have made the Commission remain in school now as helpers and now in opted for carnival dual Alexandre Louzada and Cid Carvalho, who were already from the Commission.

== Classifications ==
| Year | Place | Division | theme | Carnival Producers |
| Year | Place | Division | theme | Singers |
|---|---|---|---|---|
| 1954 | Vice Champion | Grupo 2 | O Caçador de Esmeraldas | Cabana |
| 1955 | 6th place | Grupo 1 | Páginas de Ouro da Poesia Brasileira | Nilo |
| 1956 | 12th place | Grupo 1 | O Gaúcho | Nilo |
| 1957 | 10th place | Grupo 1 | Riquezas Áureas do Brasil | Augusto de Almeida |
| 1958 | 10th place | Grupo 1 | Tomada de Monte Castelo ou Exaltação às Forças Armadas | Benedito dos Santos |
| 1959 | 9th place | Grupo 1 | Copa do Mundo | Augusto de Almeida |
| 1960 | 10th place | Grupo 1 | Regência Prima | Augusto de Almeida |
| 1961 | 8th place | Grupo 2 | Homenagem a Brasília | Josefá |
| 1962 | Vice Champion | Grupo 2 | Dia do Fico | Cabana |
| 1963 | 10th place | Grupo 1 | Peri e Ceci | Josefá |
| 1964 | 12th place | Grupo 2 | Café, Riqueza do Brasil | Cabana |
| 1965 | 3rd place | Grupo 3 | Lei do Ventre Livre | Cabana |
| 1966 | 3rd place | Grupo 3 | Fatos que Culminaram com a Independência do Brasil | Augusto de Almeida |
| 1967 | Vice Champion | Grupo 3 | A queda da Monarquia | Augusto de Almeida |
| 1968 | 9th place | Grupo 2 | Exaltação a José de Alencar | Anésio |
| 1969 | 10th place | Grupo 2 | Paquete do Exílio | Cabana |
| 1970 | 6th place | Grupo 2 | Quatro séculos de glórias | Abílio |
| 1970 | 6th place | Grupo 2 | Quatro séculos de glórias | Sílvio |
| 1971 | 7th place | Grupo 2 | Carnaval, Sublime Ilusão | Abílio |
| 1971 | 7th place | Grupo 2 | Carnaval, Sublime Ilusão | Sílvio |
| 1972 | 6th place | Grupo 2 | Bahia dos meus Amores | Abílio |
| 1972 | 6th place | Grupo 2 | Bahia dos meus Amores | Sílvio |
| 1973 | Vice Champion | Grupo 2 | Educação para o Desenvolvimento | Manoel Barroso |
| 1973 | Vice Champion | Grupo 2 | Educação para o Desenvolvimento | César Roberto Neves |
| 1974 | 7th place | Grupo 1 | Brasil Ano 2000 | Manoel Barroso; Rosa Magalhães |
| 1974 | 7th place | Grupo 1 | Brasil Ano 2000 | Zamba |
| 1975 | 7th place | Grupo 1 | O Grande Decêni | Manoel Barroso |
| 1975 | 7th place | Grupo 1 | O Grande Decêni | Bira Quininho |
| 1976 | Champion | Grupo 1 | Sonhar com Rei dá Leão | Joãosinho Trinta |
| 1976 | Champion | Grupo 1 | Sonhar com Rei dá Leão | Neguinho da Beija-Flor |
| 1977 | Champion | Grupo 1 | Vovó e o Rei da Saturnália na Corte Egipciana | Joãosinho Trinta |
| 1977 | Champion | Grupo 1 | Vovó e o Rei da Saturnália na Corte Egipciana | Neguinho da Beija-Flor |
| 1978 | Champion | Grupo 1 | A criação do mundo na tradição nagô | Joãosinho Trinta |
| 1978 | Champion | Grupo 1 | A criação do mundo na tradição nagô | Neguinho da Beija-Flor |
| 1979 | Vice Champion | Grupo 1A | O Paraíso da Loucura | Joãosinho Trinta |
| 1979 | Vice Champion | Grupo 1A | O Paraíso da Loucura | Neguinho da Beija-Flor |
| 1980 | Champion | Grupo 1A | O Sol da Meia-Noite, uma Viagem ao País das Maravilhas | Joãosinho Trinta |
| 1980 | Champion | Grupo 1A | O Sol da Meia-Noite, uma Viagem ao País das Maravilhas | Neguinho da Beija-Flor |
| 1981 | Vice Champion | Grupo 1A | Carnaval do Brasil, a Oitava das Sete Maravilhas do Mundo | Joãosinho Trinta |
| 1981 | Vice Champion | Grupo 1A | Carnaval do Brasil, a Oitava das Sete Maravilhas do Mundo | Neguinho da Beija-Flor |
| 1982 | 6th place | Grupo 1A | O Olho Azul da Serpente | Joãosinho Trinta |
| 1982 | 6th place | Grupo 1A | O Olho Azul da Serpente | Neguinho da Beija-Flor |
| 1983 | Champion | Grupo 1A | A Grande Constelação das Estrelas Negras | Joãosinho Trinta |
| 1983 | Champion | Grupo 1A | A Grande Constelação das Estrelas Negras | Neguinho da Beija-Flor |
| 1984 | 3rd place | Grupo 1A | O gigante em berço esplêndido | Joãosinho Trinta |
| 1984 | 3rd place | Grupo 1A | O gigante em berço esplêndido | Neguinho da Beija-Flor |
| 1985 | Vice Champion | Grupo 1A | A lapa de Adão e Eva | Joãosinho Trinta |
| 1985 | Vice Champion | Grupo 1A | A lapa de Adão e Eva | Neguinho da Beija-Flor |
| 1986 | Vice Champion | Grupo 1A | O mundo é uma bola | Joãosinho Trinta |
| 1986 | Vice Champion | Grupo 1A | O mundo é uma bola | Neguinho da Beija-Flor |
| 1987 | 4th place | Grupo 1 | As mágicas luzes da Ribalta | Joãosinho Trinta |
| 1987 | 4th place | Grupo 1 | As mágicas luzes da Ribalta | Neguinho da Beija-Flor |
| 1988 | 3rd place | Grupo 1 | Sou negro, do Egito à liberdade | Joãosinho Trinta |
| 1988 | 3rd place | Grupo 1 | Sou negro, do Egito à liberdade | Neguinho da Beija-Flor |
| 1989 | Vice Champion | Grupo 1 | Ratos e Urubus, larguem minha fantasia | Joãosinho Trinta |
| 1989 | Vice Champion | Grupo 1 | Ratos e Urubus, larguem minha fantasia | Neguinho da Beija-Flor |
| 1990 | Vice Champion | Grupo Especial | Todo Mundo Nasceu Nu | Joãosinho Trinta |
| 1990 | Vice Champion | Grupo Especial | Todo Mundo Nasceu Nu | Neguinho da Beija-Flor |
| 1991 | 4th place | Grupo Especial | Alice no Brasil das maravilhas | Joãosinho Trinta |
| 1991 | 4th place | Grupo Especial | Alice no Brasil das maravilhas | Neguinho da Beija-Flor |
| 1992 | 7th place | Grupo Especial | Há um ponto de luz na imensidão | Joãosinho Trinta |
| 1992 | 7th place | Grupo Especial | Há um ponto de luz na imensidão | Neguinho da Beija-Flor |
| 1993 | 3rd place | Grupo Especial | Uni-duni-tê, a Beija-flor escolheu: é você | Maria Augusta |
| 1993 | 3rd place | Grupo Especial | Uni-duni-tê, a Beija-flor escolheu: é você | Neguinho da Beija-Flor |
| 1994 | 5th place | Grupo Especial | Margareth Mee, a Dama das Bromélias | Milton Cunha |
| 1994 | 5th place | Grupo Especial | Margareth Mee, a Dama das Bromélias | Neguinho da Beija-Flor |
| 1995 | 3rd place | Grupo Especial | Bidu Sayão e o Canto de Cristal | Milton Cunha |
| 1995 | 3rd place | Grupo Especial | Bidu Sayão e o Canto de Cristal | Neguinho da Beija-Flor |
| 1996 | 3rd place | Grupo Especial | Aurora do povo Brasileiro | Milton Cunha |
| 1996 | 3rd place | Grupo Especial | Aurora do povo Brasileiro | Neguinho da Beija-Flor |
| 1997 | 4th place | Grupo Especial | A Beija-Flor é Festa na Sapucaí | Milton Cunha |
| 1997 | 4th place | Grupo Especial | A Beija-Flor é Festa na Sapucaí | Neguinho da Beija-Flor |
| 1998 | Champion | Grupo Especial | Pará: O mundo místico dos Caruanas nas águas do Patu-Anu | Anderson Miller; Cid Carvalho; Fran Sérgio; Ubiratan Silva; Nélson Ricardo; Amarildo de Mello; Paulo Führo; Victor Santos |
| 1998 | Champion | Grupo Especial | Pará: O mundo místico dos Caruanas nas águas do Patu-Anu | Neguinho da Beija-Flor |
| 1999 | Vice Champion | Grupo Especial | Araxá, Lugar Alto Onde Primeiro Se Avista o Sol | Cid Carvalho; Fran Sérgio; Ubiratan Silva; Nélson Ricardo; Shanghai |
| 1999 | Vice Champion | Grupo Especial | Araxá, Lugar Alto Onde Primeiro Se Avista o Sol | Neguinho da Beija-Flor |
| 2000 | Vice Champion | Grupo Especial | Brasil, um coração que pulsa forte. Terra de todos ou de ninguém? | Cid Carvalho; Fran Sérgio; Ubiratan Silva; Nélson Ricardo; Shanghai |
| 2000 | Vice Champion | Grupo Especial | Brasil, um coração que pulsa forte. Terra de todos ou de ninguém? | Neguinho da Beija-Flor |
| 2001 | Vice Champion | Grupo Especial | A saga de Agotime – Maria mineira Naê | Cid Carvalho; Fran Sérgio; Ubiratan Silva; Nélson Ricardo; Shanghai |
| 2001 | Vice Champion | Grupo Especial | A saga de Agotime – Maria mineira Naê | Neguinho da Beija-Flor |
| 2002 | Vice Champion | Grupo Especial | O Brasil dá o ar de sua graça de Ícaro a Rubem Berta – O ímpeto de voar | Laíla; Cid Carvalho; Fran Sérgio; Ubiratan Silva; Nélson Ricardo; Shanghai; Victor Santos |
| 2002 | Vice Champion | Grupo Especial | O Brasil dá o ar de sua graça de Ícaro a Rubem Berta – O ímpeto de voar | Neguinho da Beija-Flor |
| 2003 | Champion | Grupo Especial | O povo conta a sua história: "saco vazio não pára em pé". A mão que faz a guerra faz a paz | Laíla; Cid Carvalho; Fran Sérgio; Ubiratan Silva; Shanghai |
| 2003 | Champion | Grupo Especial | O povo conta a sua história: "saco vazio não pára em pé". A mão que faz a guerra faz a paz | Neguinho da Beija-Flor |
| 2004 | Champion | Grupo Especial | Manôa – Manaus – Amazônia – Terra Santa: Alimenta o corpo, equilibra a alma e transmite a paz | Laíla; Cid Carvalho; Fran Sérgio; Ubiratan Silva; Shanghai |
| 2004 | Champion | Grupo Especial | Manôa – Manaus – Amazônia – Terra Santa: Alimenta o corpo, equilibra a alma e transmite a paz | Neguinho da Beija-Flor |
| 2005 | Champion | Grupo Especial | O vento corta as terras dos pampas. Em nome do Pai, do Filho e do Espírito guarani. Sete Povos na fé e na dor... Sete missões de amor | Laíla; Cid Carvalho; Fran Sérgio; Ubiratan Silva; Shanghai |
| 2005 | Champion | Grupo Especial | O vento corta as terras dos pampas. Em nome do Pai, do Filho e do Espírito guarani. Sete Povos na fé e na dor... Sete missões de amor | Neguinho da Beija-Flor |
| 2006 | 5th place | Grupo Especial | Poços de Caldas derrama sobre a Terra suas águas milagrosas: do caos inicial à explosão da vida, Água... a nave mãe da existência | Laíla; Cid Carvalho; Fran Sérgio; Ubiratan Silva; Shanghai |
| 2006 | 5th place | Grupo Especial | Poços de Caldas derrama sobre a Terra suas águas milagrosas: do caos inicial à explosão da vida, Água... a nave mãe da existência | Neguinho da Beija-Flor |
| 2007 | Champion | Grupo Especial | Áfricas, do berço real à corte brasiliana | Laíla; Fran Sérgio; Ubiratan Silva; Shanghai; Alexandre Louzada |
| 2007 | Champion | Grupo Especial | Áfricas, do berço real à corte brasiliana | Neguinho da Beija-Flor |
| 2008 | Champion | Grupo Especial | Macapaba – Equinócio Solar. Viagens fantásticas ao meio do mundo | Laíla; Fran Sérgio; Ubiratan Silva; Shanghai; Alexandre Louzada |
| 2008 | Champion | Grupo Especial | Macapaba – Equinócio Solar. Viagens fantásticas ao meio do mundo | Neguinho da Beija-Flor |
| 2009 | Vice Champion | Grupo Especial | No chuveiro da alegria, quem banha o corpo lava a alma na folia | Laíla; Fran Sérgio; Ubiratan Silva; Alexandre Louzada |
| 2009 | Vice Champion | Grupo Especial | No chuveiro da alegria, quem banha o corpo lava a alma na folia | Neguinho da Beija-Flor |
| 2010 | 3rd place | Grupo Especial | Brilhante Ao Sol Do Novo Mundo, Brasília: Do Sonho À Realidade, A Capital da Esperança | Laíla; Fran Sérgio; Ubiratan Silva; Alexandre Louzada |
| 2010 | 3rd place | Grupo Especial | Brilhante Ao Sol Do Novo Mundo, Brasília: Do Sonho À Realidade, A Capital da Esperança | Neguinho da Beija-Flor |
| 2011 | Champion | Grupo Especial | Roberto Carlos: A Simplicidade de um Rei | Laíla; Fran Sérgio; Ubiratan Silva; Alexandre Louzada; Victor Santos |
| 2011 | Champion | Grupo Especial | Roberto Carlos: A Simplicidade de um Rei | Neguinho da Beija-Flor |
| 2012 | 4th place | Grupo Especial | São Luís – O Poema Encantado do Maranhão | Laíla; Fran Sérgio; Ubiratan Silva; Victor Santos; André Cezari |
| 2012 | 4th place | Grupo Especial | São Luís – O Poema Encantado do Maranhão | Neguinho da Beija-Flor |
| 2013 | Vice Champion | Grupo Especial | Amigo Fiel: Do Cavalo do Amanhecer ao Mangalarga Marchador | Laíla; Fran Sérgio; Ubiratan Silva; Victor Santos; André Cezari; Bianca Behrends |
| 2013 | Vice Champion | Grupo Especial | Amigo Fiel: Do Cavalo do Amanhecer ao Mangalarga Marchador | Neguinho da Beija-Flor |
| 2014 | 7th place | Grupo Especial | O Astro iluminado da comunicação Brasileira | Laíla; Fran Sérgio; Ubiratan Silva; Victor Santos; André Cezari; Bianca Behrends; Adriane Lins |
| 2014 | 7th place | Grupo Especial | O Astro iluminado da comunicação Brasileira | Neguinho da Beija-Flor |
| 2015 | Champion | Grupo Especial | Um Griô conta a história: um olhar sobre a África e o despontar da Guiné Equatorial. Caminhemos sobre a trilha de nossa felicidade | Laíla; Fran Sérgio; Ubiratan Silva; Victor Santos; André Cezari; Bianca Behrends; Cláudio Russo |
| 2015 | Champion | Grupo Especial | Um Griô conta a história: um olhar sobre a África e o despontar da Guiné Equatorial. Caminhemos sobre a trilha de nossa felicidade | Neguinho da Beija-Flor |
| 2016 | 5th place | Grupo Especial | Mineirinho Genial! Nova Lima – Cidade Natal. Marquês de Sapucaí – O Poeta Imortal | Laíla; Fran Sérgio; Victor Santos; André Cezari; Bianca Behrends; Cláudio Russo |
| 2016 | 5th place | Grupo Especial | Mineirinho Genial! Nova Lima – Cidade Natal. Marquês de Sapucaí – O Poeta Imortal | Neguinho da Beija-Flor |
| 2017 | 6th place | Grupo Especial | A virgem dos lábios de mel: Iracema | Laíla; Fran Sérgio; Ubiratan Silva; Victor Santos; André Cezari; Bianca Behrends; Cristiano Bara; Rodrigo Pacheco; Wladimir Morellembaum; Brendo Vieira; Gabriel Mello; Adriane Lins; Léo Mídia |
| 2017 | 6th place | Grupo Especial | A virgem dos lábios de mel: Iracema | Neguinho da Beija-Flor |
| 2018 | Champion | Grupo Especial | Monstro é aquele que não sabe amar. Os filhos abandonados da pátria que os pariu | Laíla; Marcelo Misailidis; Cid Carvalho; Victor Santos; Rodrigo Pacheco; Bianca Behrends; Léo Mídia |
| 2018 | Champion | Grupo Especial | Monstro é aquele que não sabe amar. Os filhos abandonados da pátria que os pariu | Neguinho da Beija-Flor |
| 2019 | 11th place | Grupo Especial | Quem não viu vai ver... As Fábulas da Beija-Flor | Marcelo Misailidis; Cid Carvalho; Victor Santos; Rodrigo Pacheco; Bianca Behrends; Léo Mídia; Válber Frutuoso |
| 2019 | 11th place | Grupo Especial | Quem não viu vai ver... As Fábulas da Beija-Flor | Neguinho da Beija-Flor |
| 2020 | 4th place | Grupo Especial | Se essa rua fosse minha… | Alexandre Louzada; Cid Carvalho |
| 2020 | 4th place | Grupo Especial | Se essa rua fosse minha… | Neguinho da Beija-Flor |
| 2022 | Vice Champion | Grupo Especial | Empretecer o pensamento é ouvir a voz da Beija-Flor | Alexandre Louzada |
| 2022 | Vice Champion | Grupo Especial | Empretecer o pensamento é ouvir a voz da Beija-Flor | Neguinho da Beija-Flor |
| 2023 | 4th place | Grupo Especial | Brava Gente! O Grito dos Excluídos no Bicentenário da Independência | Alexandre Louzada; André Rodrigues |
| 2023 | 4th place | Grupo Especial | Brava Gente! O Grito dos Excluídos no Bicentenário da Independência | Neguinho da Beija-Flor |
| 2024 | 8th place | Grupo Especial | Um delírio de carnaval na Maceió de Rás Gonguila | João Vitor Araújo |
| 2024 | 8th place | Grupo Especial | Um delírio de carnaval na Maceió de Rás Gonguila | Neguinho da Beija-Flor |
| 2025 | Champion | Grupo Especial | Laíla de Todos os Santos, Laíla de Todos os Sambas | João Vitor Araújo |
| 2025 | Champion | Grupo Especial | Laíla de Todos os Santos, Laíla de Todos os Sambas | Neguinho da Beija-Flor |
