= Federico Maldarelli =

Italian painter

Federico or Federigo Maldarelli (October 2, 1826 – December 9, 1893) was an Italian painter born in Naples.

== Biography ==
His father was a painter, but Maldarelli's first formal training was under Costanzo Angelini.

He first exhibited at the 1839 Mostre Borboniche, a painting of Head of the Holy Virgin. He participated in this exhibition regularly until 1859. In 1855, he was awarded the third-class gold medal for his San Gliceria converte e battezza il suo carceriere (in the Capodimonte Museum). The painting hung next to the famed Gl'iconoclasti of Domenico Morelli. Both painters became lifelong friends.

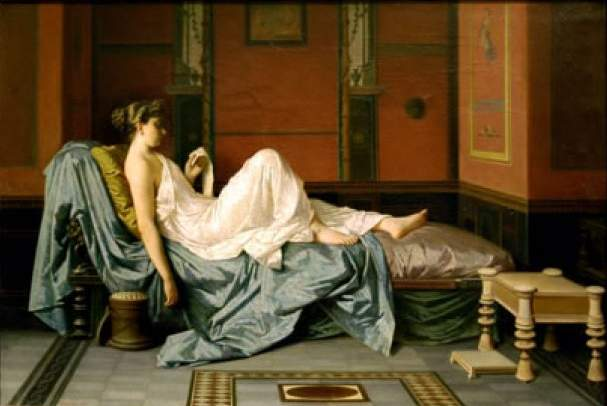
Reclining Pompeian Woman

After the 1860s, he painted almost exclusively historical costume scenes of Neo-pompeian subjects. In 1877 at Naples, he exhibited Un episodio dell'ultimo giorno di Pompei. In 1880 at Turin, he exhibited Suonatrice pompeiana; Fioraia, and Vestale sepolta viva. Other paintings include: Via di Pompei; Costume romano; Etera pompeiana. One of his pupils was Lilla Maldura.
