= Laylah Ali Othman =

Nigerian business women

- Born: January 29, 1986 (age 40); Yobe State, Nigeria
- Education: BA English
- Alma mater: University of Maiduguri
- Occupations: Business woman, writer, tv presenter
- Years active: 2010 till present
- Known for: Business
- Spouse: Yusuf Adamu Gagdi (m. 2023)

Laylah Ali Othman (born January 29, 1986) is a Nigerian interior designer, writer and reality TV presenter as well as business woman, who is best known for selling home furnishings such as chairs and beds. She is also known as the owner of a publishing company called L magazine, and it presents a program called Voices of the Youth.

== Early life and education ==
Laylah was born in Yobe State of Nigeria, but she grew up in Kaduna, where she studied her basic education, nursery and primary school in Kaduna state. She later completed her junior and senior high school in Damaturu. She is currently the CEO and managing director of Superb Brand, namely & N (Laylah & Nahaar) Interiors and Exterior Décor Nig.

She has a degree in BA English from University of Maiduguri, Diploma in interior decoration from Lotus Educational Institute, Dubai and another diploma in space management from Maren School of Interior Décor and Design. Additionally, she has another 2nd degree from ESCAE-University, Benin republic

== Awards and achievements ==
Year	Award	Organization
2015	Award of Honor	Eastern Mediterranean University (Nigerian Week)
2018	Award of Excellence	Gamji Students
2018	Award of Excellence	Department of Public Admin, Faculty of Admin, ABU
2018	Award of Excellence	West African Students
2018	Certificate of Appreciation	Startup Sokoto
2018	Certificate of Participation	Startup Kano
2019	Meritorious Award of Honor	Nigerian Youth Progress in Democracy
2019	Certificate of Honor	Democratic Youth Assembly of Nigeria
2019	Award of Honor	National Association of Nigerian Students (Zone A)
2019	Life Time Award of Credence	Youth Assembly of Nigeria
2019	Northern Philanthropic Award of Excellence	Save Democracy Group, Africa
2019	Corporate Social Responsibility Award	PR Times Africa
2020	Award of Honor	National Association of Northern Corpers

== Personal life ==
Laylah is married to Yusuf Adamu Gagdi, who is a politician of the All Progressives Congress from Plateau State, Nigeria.
