= Leela and Ellie Grace =

Leela and Ellie Grace are a duo of American singer/songwriters. They are sisters, the daughters of Paul and Win Grace. They perform a mixture of original compositions by both sisters, traditional folk and old time songs, and covers of songs by other contemporary folk songwriters.

== Early career ==
Leela and Ellie were born in Columbia Missouri in 1977 and 1978 respectively. Growing up, they frequently traveled with their parents, traveling musicians Paul Fotsch (formerly Grace) and Win Grace. They grew up surrounded by the music of their parents and their parents' peers and colleagues, and started performing with their parents at an early age.

The Grace family released three albums as a quartet: Carved Out of Time (1990), In Dreams I Hear Music (1993), and Dance Upon This Earth (1996).

"Carved Out of Time" was re-released on CD as "Fiddle, Folk and Foolishness" in 2006. This CD also includes "Fifty Miles of Elbow Room" (1987) and "A Place In the Choir" (1984).

== Recent works ==
Leela and Ellie started touring as a duo in 1997, and in 2003 released their eponymous first duo album. It contains one original song by Ellie and four by Leela, plus nine additional songs, a mixture of traditional songs and covers.

In 2008 they released their second album, Where the Waters Run, with five original songs by Leela, three by Ellie, one co-written, and two traditional songs. Folk disc jockey Steve Jerrett named Where the Waters Run as one of the 15 best new albums of 2008.

== Instruments ==
Leela plays banjo and guitar. Ellie plays fiddle, mandolin, and guitar. Both also perform percussive dance, combining elements of clogging, tap dancing, step dancing, and other styles.

== Current status ==
In addition to performing, individually and together, both Leela and Ellie teach classes in percussive dance, harmony singing, banjo (Leela) and other topics. They also continue to write.

Leela currently lives in Portland, Oregon. Ellie currently lives in Kansas City, Missouri.
