= Krishna Leela (disambiguation) =

Krishna Leela or Krishnaleela may refer to:

- Raslila, divine dance in Hinduism of the deity Krishna with his consort Radha and other cowherd gopis
- Krishna Leela (1946 film), an Indian Hindi-language film
- Krishnaleela (1947 film), an Indian Kannada-language film
- Krishna Leela (2015 film), an Indian Kannada-language romance film
- Krishna Leela, an unrealized Indian film starring Kamal Haasan

== See also ==
- Krishna (disambiguation)
- Leela (disambiguation)
- Rasaleela (disambiguation)
- Ramleela (disambiguation)
- Manmadha Leelai (disambiguation)
