= Leila Hoteit =

Lebanese management consultant (born 1974)

- ليلى حطيط
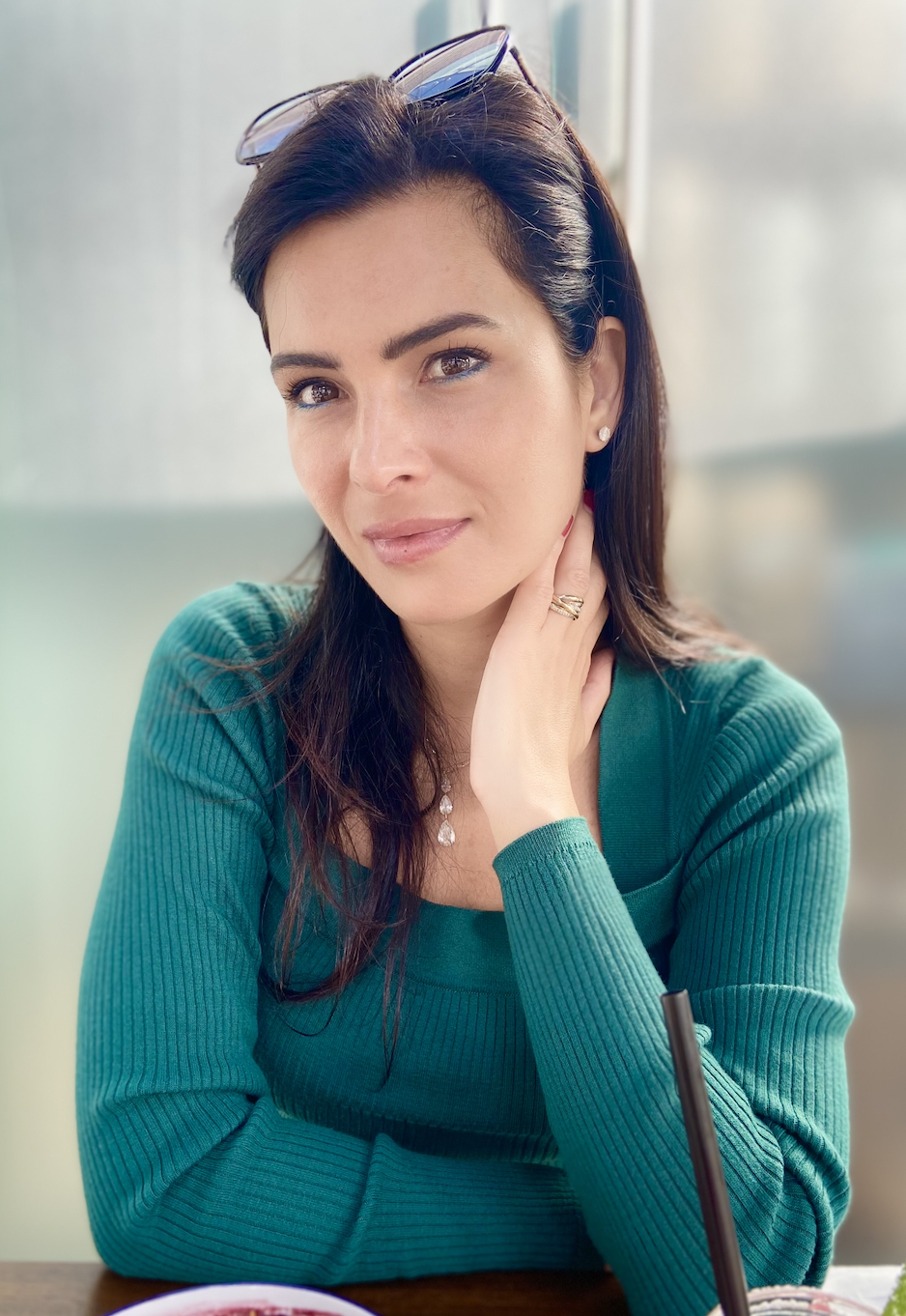
- Born: 23 May 1974 (age 51)
- Education: Imperial College, INSEAD
- Occupation: Senior partner at BCG
- Known for: Business Woman
- Children: 3

Leila Hoteit, (ليلى حطيط) a Lebanese / British woman, a specialist in human capital topics, a managing director, and a senior partner in Boston Consulting Group in Dubai. She is the global lead of Boston Consulting Group's education, employment, and welfare sector.

== Personal life ==
Hoteit grew up in Lebanon with her parents and sister. Her father was a pilot and director of operation of the Lebanese Airlines.

At the age 18, Hoteit was one of the few women that traveled abroad to continue her studies.

In May 2016, she gave a Ted Talk entitled “3 lessons on success from an Arab businesswoman” where she highlighted how women should work on lifting each other up instead of seeking the spotlight alone.

== Education ==
Hoteit is a French educated student. She graduated high school in 1992 with a French Baccalaureate in Lebanon. Leila then continued her Bachelor studies in London, United Kingdom, in the Imperial College, where she majored in Electrical and Computer Engineering followed by a PhD in Communication and Signal Processing. Hoteit later earned a Master's Degree in Business Administration in 2003 at INSEAD, France.

== Career ==
Hoteit started her career in the United Kingdom in 1999 as a research scientist in the Schlumberger Cambridge Research. She developed an approach in Borehole Telemetry that contributed to 30% reduction in telemetry downtime. She then continued working at the Cambridge Centre for International Research in 2001 as Program Manager. She led a team of six research scientists and developed strong external network of expertise with universities (Oxford, Imperial College and Cambridge) and helped in the development of strategic planning for long term technology developments in the field of Drilling Interpretation and Control.

Later on, she worked for Oilfield Services in Paris, France in 2003 where she introduced new technologies and services for Open Hole Wireline and managed its business development.

In 2006, Hoteit was a senior associate in Booz & Company at Abu Dhabi, UAE. She participated in various strategy development projects related to operating model design, Financial modeling, transformation programs, and implementation programs. In her projects, Hoteit helped in the organization transformation for Regional Oil and Gas Co. Company but also developed a socio-economic impact assessment in Abu Dhabi Saadiyat Cultural District.

Hoteit then became a senior member of Booz & Company in 2009. She was positioned around the Human Capital Agenda covering education and women empowerment.

In 2013, she was promoted to partner and vice president at Booz and Company and was responsible for the Human Capital development platform.

In 2014, Hoteit joined the Boston Consulting Group (BCG) and led the human capital development sector in the Middle East. Today, she is a member of the global leadership teams of both the public sector and social impact practices of BCG. Hoteit has over 20 years of strategy and operations experience acquired through projects in the Middle East and Europe. Today She is in the leadership team of the Public and Education sectors. Hoteit is passionate about women empowerment and has written multiple publications on the topic.

== Publications, articles and lectures ==
She had many publications and gave lectures that revolved around Education, Employment and Women empowerment. Some of her works are listed below:

- "Ten Lessons for Universities to Prepare Students for Long-Term Success"
- "MENA Talent Map"
- "Cities of Choice: Are People Happy Where They Live?
- "Crafting a Value Proposition for National Growth"
- "Creating a New Reality: The Metaverse in MENAT"
- "What a Multicountry Study Reveals About K–12 Education Models for Students with Disabilities"
- "To Transform Economies, Promote Specialization"
- "What the Public Sector Workforce Wants"
- "Why Children Are Unsafe in Cyberspace"
- "Empowering Women to Work in Cybersecurity Is a Win-Win"
- "Building Future Resilience of K-12 Schools"
- "What Governments Can Do to Curb Inequality"
- “Empowering The Third Billion: Women and the World of Work 2012”.
- “A Decade of Opportunity: The Coming Expansion of the Private Schools Market in the GCC”.
- “Education in the Mena region needs guidance while it’s young”.
- “Student voices vital to education reform”.
- "The Future of Technology Education, How Governments Can Help Bridge the 21st Century Skills Gap" The Boston Consulting Group, World Government Summit.
- "Women on the Move". The Boston Consulting Group.
- Panelist in Women in the World on “Reinvent the rules”, New York, 2018.
- Keynote speaker, SME Advisor, “Is the Future Female? Gender Parity in the World of Tomorrow”, Dubai, 2017.
- TED talk"3 lessons on success from an Arab businesswoman."
- "How to Start Building the Government of the Future”
- “Flex-Work Programs That Actually Work”
- “Motivation and Perseverance: The Missing Link to GCC Knowledge Economies”
- “Economic Contribution of Women”
- “Education Must Spread Beyond School”
- “‘Third Billion' to have Significant Economic Impact”
- “A Decade of Opportunity: The Coming Expansion of the Private Schools Market in the GCC”
- “Educated, Ambitious, Essential Women Will Drive the GCC’s Future”
- “How to Keep the Promise of the Third Billion”
- “Women Can Ease Gulf’s Skilled Labour Shortage”
- "How The Functional Revolution Can Promote Women”
- “The Private Education Opportunity in The GCC”

== Honors and awards ==
Hoteit worked as a senior research scientist at Schlumberger Cambridge research center from January 1999 till February 2001, and received an inventor award for improving borehole telemetry downtime.

She was chosen as a Young Global Leader in 2014 for her work on human capital development by the World Economic Forum. Hoteit was also selected as an expert member in the UNESCO Inclusive Policy Lab in 2019.

Hoteit was Honored as Businesswoman of the Year at the Arab Woman Awards UAE 2016.

She has been recognized by Forbes Middle East a multiple times:

o 100 Most Influential Women 2018.

o The Middle East's Power Businesswomen 2021.

o 100 most powerful Business Women for 2023.

She is also the author of multiple patents:

o Seismic acquisition and filtering; Patent date Issued Sept. 1, 2009 Patent issuer and number us 7584057

o Methods and systems for averting or mitigating undesirable drilling events; Patent date Issued March 22, 2005 Patent issuer and number us 6868920
