= Lailah (angel) =

Angel in Jewish mythology

Lailah (Heb. לַיְלָה, Laylāh, meaning "Night") is an angel in some interpretations in the Talmud and in some later Jewish mythology, associated with the night, as well as conception and pregnancy.

== Etymology ==
"Lailah" is the same as the Hebrew word for "night" laylah (לילה). The noun for "night" in the Semitic languages is derived from the tri-consonantal root: L-Y-L, also found in Arabic laylah "night" (Arabic: ليلى).

== An angel called "night" ==
=== Talmud ===
An angel named Lailah is not mentioned in the Hebrew Bible. The identification of the word "night" as the name of an angel originates with an interpretation of Genesis 14:15 found in the Babylonian Talmud Sanhedrin 96a. This passage, relating to Abraham's night attack on the four kings led by Chedorlaomer, reads: "And he divided himself against them by night, he and his servants, and smote them". Rabbi Yochanan interprets this to mean that Abraham attacked with the help of an angel called "night". This interpretation is supported with reference to Job 3:3, which reads: "And night [lailah] said: A male child is brought forth".

In Niddah 16b, the interpretation of rabbi Hanina ben Pappa (3rd century AD) posits that Lailah is an angel in charge of conception who takes a drop of semen and places it before God:

For R. Hanina b. Papa made the following exposition: The name of the angel who is in charge of conception is 'Night', and she takes up a drop and places it in the presence of the Holy One, blessed be He, saying, 'Sovereign of the universe, what shall be the fate of this drop? Shall it produce a strong man or a weak man, a wise man or a fool, a rich man or a poor man?'

According to this exposition, the only thing God is not asked to decide is whether the child will be righteous or wicked, allowing it to have free will.

=== Midrash ===
Midrash Tanhuma also details how Lailah is in charge of conception (לַמַּלְאָךְ הַמְּמֻנָּה עַל הַהֵרָיוֹן). As in Niddah 16b, God decrees everything about the unborn child's fate except whether it will be righteous or wicked, since this is a choice the individual has to make for themself.

The angel is also mentioned in Zohar Chadash 68:3, again described as being in charge of conception and pregnancy.

=== Contemporary sources ===
The story of Lailah is mentioned by Louis Ginzberg in Legends of the Jews.

Folklorist Howard Schwartz has claimed that unlike most angels, Lailah exhibits "distinctly feminine characteristics". Schwartz suggests that Lailah is the polar opposite of Lilith, who wastes seed, is not maternal, and is bent on destruction, not creation.

== Rabbinical commentary on "night" itself ==
The word "night" appears hundreds of times in the Hebrew Bible and continues to be the subject of rabbinic discussion. The noun layla is a feminine noun in Hebrew, although grammatical gender does not indicate actual gender in Hebrew. Nevertheless, according to Elijah Ben Solomon, the "Vilna Gaon" (1720–1797), Talmudist, halachist, and kabbalist, the Hebrew noun laylah (night) is feminine in its very essence, but has the unusual quality of dualism that combines the feminine with masculine character. In the Zohar, comparison is made between leyl (masculine noun) and layla (feminine noun) "night" is used in reference to the Exodus "to indicate the union which took place on that night between the Masculine and Feminine aspects in the Divine attributes." (Zohar, Shemoth, Section 2).

== See also ==
- List of angels in theology
- Leela (name) (an ancient Vedic concept denoting playful chaos or action by which God acts and creates and often used as the first name of a Hindu girl)
- Nyx (Greek goddess whose name translates to night)
