= Leilah Mahi =

French writer (1890–1932)

Leïlah Mahi
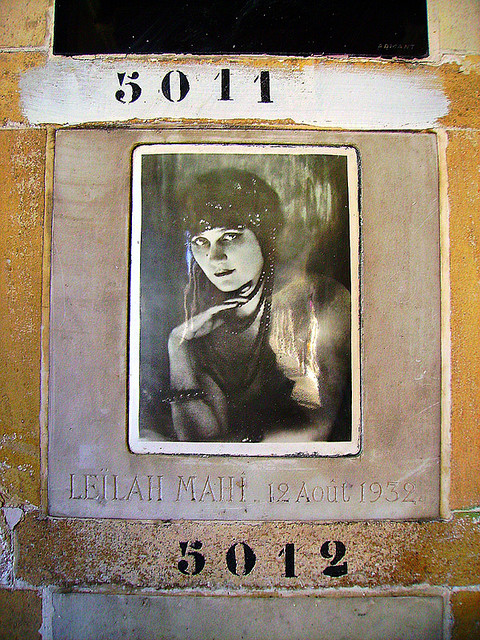
- Mahi's grave
- Born: September 1890; Beyrouth, Lebanon
- Died: 12 August 1932 (aged 41); Paris, France
- Resting place: Père Lachaise Cemetery
- Occupation: Writer
- Writing career
- Language: French
- Notable works: En Marge du Bonheur (1929), La Prêtresse sans Dieu (1931)

Leïlah Mahi (September 1890, Beyrouth, Lebanon – 12 August 1932, Paris) was a French writer.

Her first work, En Marge du Bonheur (On the Margins of Happiness), was published in 1929. Her second book, La Prêtresse sans Dieu (The Priestess without God) appeared in 1931, the year before her death. Both titles were published by Louis Querelle (26 Rue Cambon, Paris) as numbered, limited edition print runs.

== Personal life ==
Leïlah's death certificate records her as unmarried and gives her domicile as 13 rue Shakespeare, Nice, Alpes-Maritimes, but she actually died at 59 Rue Geoffroy Saint Hillaire, Paris. Her memorial can be found in the columbarium of Père Lachaise Cemetery.

== Legacy ==
French author Didier Blonde's biography of Mahi won the 2015 Prix Renaudot de l'essai.
