= Lilas (disambiguation) =

Lilas is a village in Iran.

Lilas can also mean:

- Les Lilas, in Paris, France
- Mairie des Lilas station, a Paris Metro station
- Porte des Lilas station, a Paris Metro station
- Lilás, the sixth album of Brazilian singer and songwriter Djavan, released in 1984
- Lilas Ikuta (born 2000), Japanese singer-songwriter and member of Yoasobi
