= Layla Andrews =

British visual artist

- Born: Layla Andrews; 1997 (age 28–29)
- Education: University of Brighton (BA)
- Years active: 2013–present
- Website: www.laylaandrews.com

Layla Andrews (born 1997) is an English painter, sculptor and curator.

== Early life ==
Andrews was raised in Hampshire by her mother and grandmother. Her grandfather is Saint Helenian. She graduated with a Bachelor of Arts (BA) in History, Literature and Culture from the University of Brighton.

== Career ==
Andrews first gained prominence at age 15 when she submitted a portrait she painted in school of Nelson Mandela to the South African Embassy. The painting was accepted and displayed by the Nelson Mandela Foundation, and Andrews was invited to attend Mandela's funeral.

In 2015, Andrews stayed with family friends in Washington DC who worked in design and carpeting at the White House. A portrait she painted of Barack Obama earned attention from Obama himself.

Andrews' first solo exhibition It's All Gravy was held at the Oxo Tower on London's South Bank in 2017. She returned to the Oxo Tower in 2019 for her second solo exhibition Feast and Famine.

In 2021, Andrews took part in her first group exhibitions Heart of the Matter at Gillian Jason Gallery in London and the inaugural All Together Now at Big Yin Gallery in St Leonards-on-Sea. Her third solo exhibition Ahzun was held at the Old Bank Vault. That autumn, Andrews was appointed Artist in Residence at Brixton Village. Through this, she curated her first exhibition titled A Fish Without a Bicycle in 2022. The exhibition featured the rising artists Jo Kitchen, Louisa Tratalos, Gayle Ebose, Imogen Allen, Charlotte Mei, Melissa Kitty Jarram and Sheila Maurice-Grey.

Also in 2022, India Rose James began championing Andrews' work at her gallery the Soho Revue, starting with the solo exhibition Good Company. Andrews' work featured in the 2022 Kensington + Chelsea Art Week (KCAW) Chelsea Windows, curated by Bella Bonner-Evans and the Bristol group exhibition Spring Greens. For International Women's Day 2022, Andrews featured on the Evening Standard list of "London women changing the world".

Andrews returned to Evans' Soho Revue with the solo exhibitions Bastard Gurmwood in 2023 and Flies in Amber in 2024.

== Exhibitions ==
=== Solo ===
- It's All Gravy (2017) at Oxo Tower (London)
- Ahzun (2021) at the Old Bank Vault (London)
- Good Company (2022) at Soho Revue (London)
- Bastard Gurmwood (2023) at Soho Revue (London)
- Flies in Amber (2024) at Soho Revue (London)

=== Curated ===
- A Fish Without a Bicycle (2022) at Brixton Village (London)

=== Group ===
- Heart of the Matter (2021) at Gillian Jason Gallery (London)
- All Together Now (2021) at Big Yin Gallery (St Leonards-on-Sea)
- Spring Greens (2022) at Livingstone St Ives (Bristol)
- Works on Paper (2024) at Quench Gallery (Margate)
- Small is Beautiful 43rd Edition (2025) at Flowers Gallery (London)
- Zona Maco exhibition (2026) at Georgina Pounds Gallery (Mexico City)
- Cables of Cobwebs (2026) at Patricia Low Contemporary (Venice)
