= Lejla =

Lejla may refer to:

== People ==
- Lejla Agolli (born 1950), Albanian composer
- Lejla Basic (born 1994), Swedish footballer
- Lejla Hot (born 1986), Serbian pop singer, musician, and songwriter.
- Lejla Kalamujić, Bosnian writer
- Lejla Tanović (born 1994), Bosnian mountain bike racer

== Music ==
- Lejla (opera) by Karel Bendl 1868
- "Lejla" (song), by Hari Mata Hari, the Bosnian entry in the 2006 Eurovision Song Contest
- "Lejla", a song by Vajta, the Yugoslavian entry in the 1981 Eurovision Song Contest
