= Leila Anderson =

South African performance artist

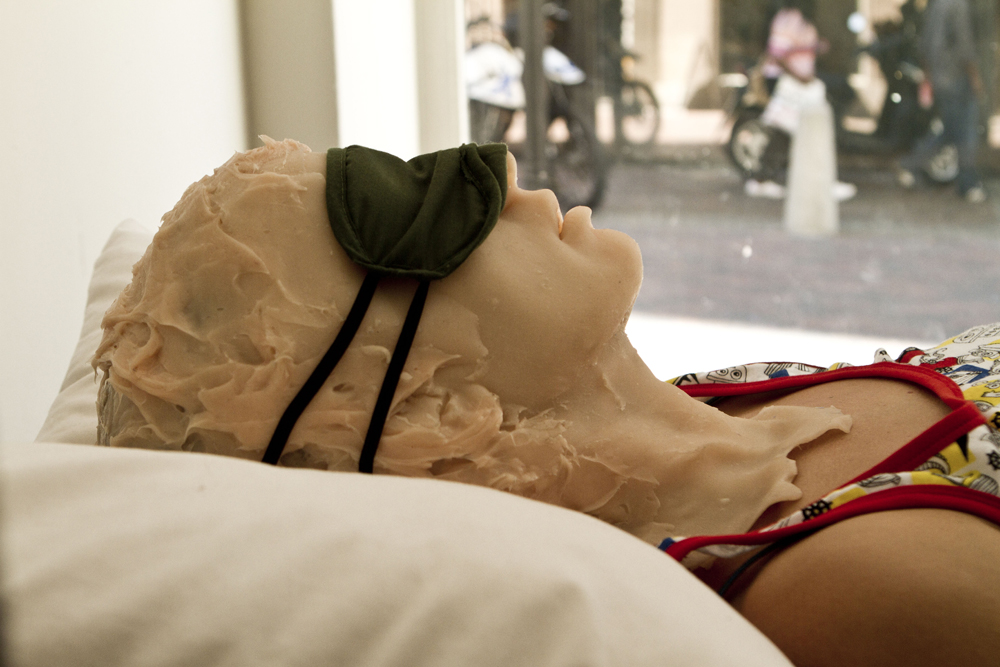
- Leila Anderson: Diagnosis (Infecting the City, 2012)
- Born: June 3, 1984 (age 41)
- Known for: Performance art, Theatre
- Awards: Theaterformen Festival Grant Holder, 2011; Naledi Theatre Award (Nomination) – Best Costume Design, 2011; Fleur Du Cap Award (Nomination) – Best Costume Design, 2008

Leila Anderson (born 1984) is a South African performance artist whose work balances the theatrical, the visual, and the performative. Her ongoing collaboration with Dutch artist Stan Wannet has produced several live installation works during the 2010s. She is a part-time lecturer in contemporary performance at the University of Cape Town.

== Career ==
=== Performances & Exhibitions ===
2012

- Infecting the City
- The Diagnosis - i.c.w. Stan Wannet - Shop 4 Allianz House, Infecting the City Public Arts Festival
- Afrika Lag [Deel 2] - i.c.w. Stan Wannet - On the Edge of Wrong Festival, Commune 1

2011

- Who knows what it is this mysterious substance that everyone seems to be so worried about identifying - i.c.w. Stan Wannet - Stedelijk Museum 's-Hertogenbosch
- Who knows what it is... - i.c.w. Stan Wannet - research and development phase on residency at Beijing

Art Lab

- EXOTIC ALIEN – photographic series created with Guy De Lancey
- EXOTIC ALIEN - solo performance in On the Edge of Wrong Festival

2010

- Foreign Affair: Trotsky – i.c.w Rodney Place - solo multi-media performance, X-op Helsinki and at the Kunstmuseum Bonn
- Foreign Affair: Trotsky – i.c.w. Rodney Place - solo performance with print exhibition, Resolution Gallery
- Imperfections – co-director, designer & performer, Infecting the City, Spier Public Arts Festival
- Inkosazana – director, writer & designer, Out the Box Festival

2009

- Inkosazana– director, writer & designer, premiered on the Edinburgh Fringe
- Wrecked – director, co-designer, performed on the Edinburgh Fringe
- Out of the eater came forth meat/ Out of the strong came forth sweet – with the erf [81] cultural collective, FNB Dance Umbrella

" Dinner for Three – actor, co-writer

2008

- Suckle- director, writer & designer, Out the Box Festival
- we are too many - solo performance i.c.w. Peter Van Heerden - erf [81] cultural collective, Spier Contemporary

2007

- Shlof shoyn, mayn Kind - director, performer, Fresh II - National Arts Festival
- 'Publication: Leila Anderson, ‘Obsession and the other: A critique of the influence of the Japanese aesthetic in the work of Geoffrey Hyland’, South African Theatre Journal SATJ 20 (2006)

== Notable works ==
- The Diagnosis

Live installation and performance, as part of the 2012 Infecting the City festival in Cape Town

- Who knows what it is, this mysterious substance that everyone seems to be so worried about identifying

Installation and performance i.c.w. Stan Wannet, Stedelijk Museum 's-Hertogenbosch.

- Foreign Affair: Trotsky

Live performance, video, Johannesburg, 16 minutes, 2010 i.c.w. Rodney Place

- Inkosazana

Performance, Edinburgh Fringe, 60 minutes, 2009
