= Leila Stockmarr =

Danish politician (born 1982)

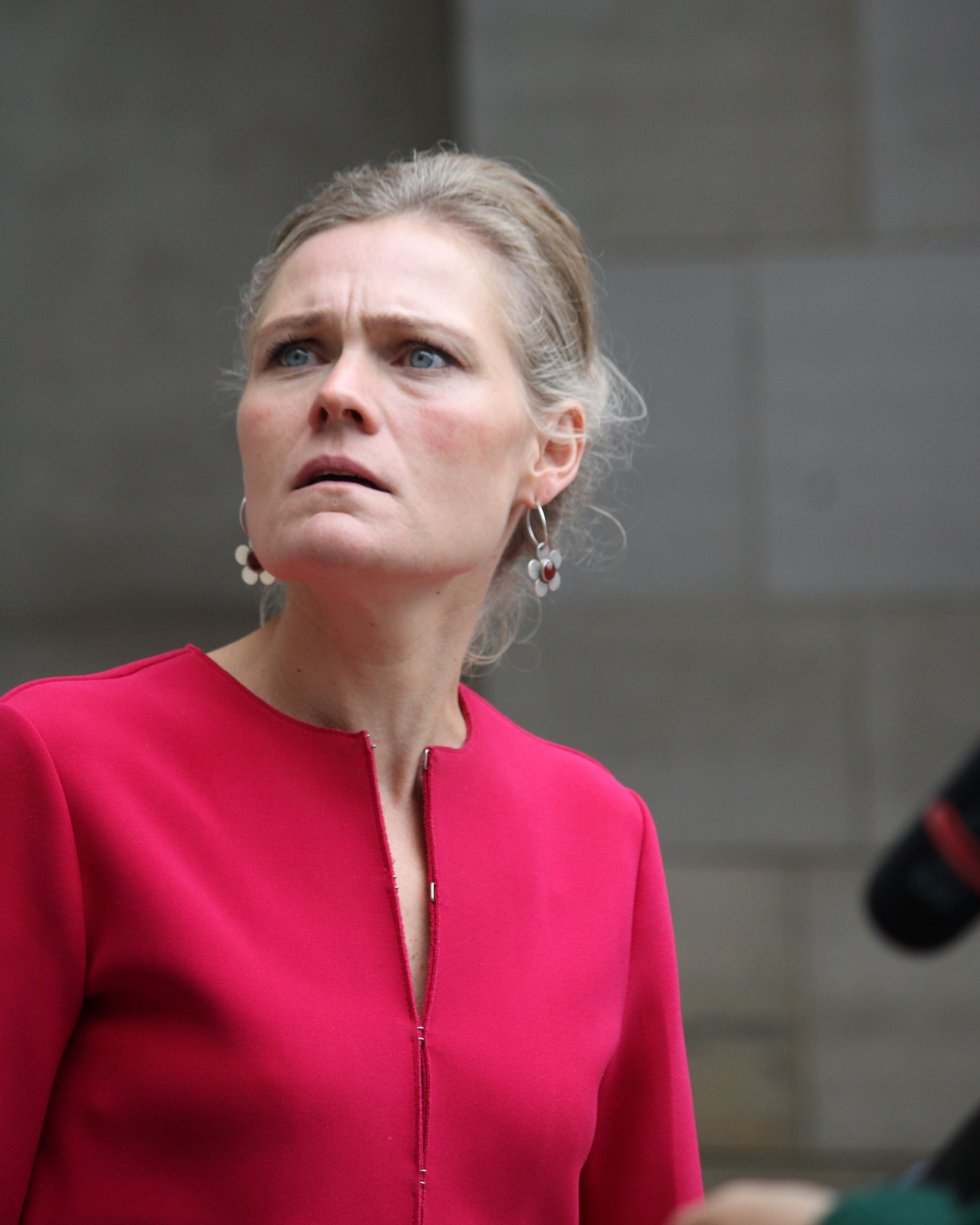
- Stockmarr in 2025

Member of the Folketing
- Incumbent
- Assumed office 1 November 2024
- Preceded by: Jette Gottlieb
- Constituency: Copenhagen

Personal details
- Born: 1 April 1982 (age 44) Copenhagen, Denmark
- Party: Red–Green Alliance
- Other political affiliations: The Alternative (previously)
- Education: SOAS University of London; Roskilde University

Leila Stockmarr (born 1 April 1982) is a Danish politician who entered the Danish Parliament for the Red–Green Alliance on 1 November 2024, when Jette Gottlieb retired.

== Education ==
Leila Stockmarr holds an MSc in politics with a focus on the Middle East from SOAS University of London from 2009 and an MSc from Roskilde University from 2010. She also holds a PhD in global studies from RUC from 2015.

== Political career ==
=== The Alternative ===
Leila Stockmarr is a former political leader and executive board member of The Alternative. She became the party's political leader in 2018. She stepped down from her positions as executive board member and spokesperson in 2020, but remained a member of the party.

=== Red–Green Alliance ===
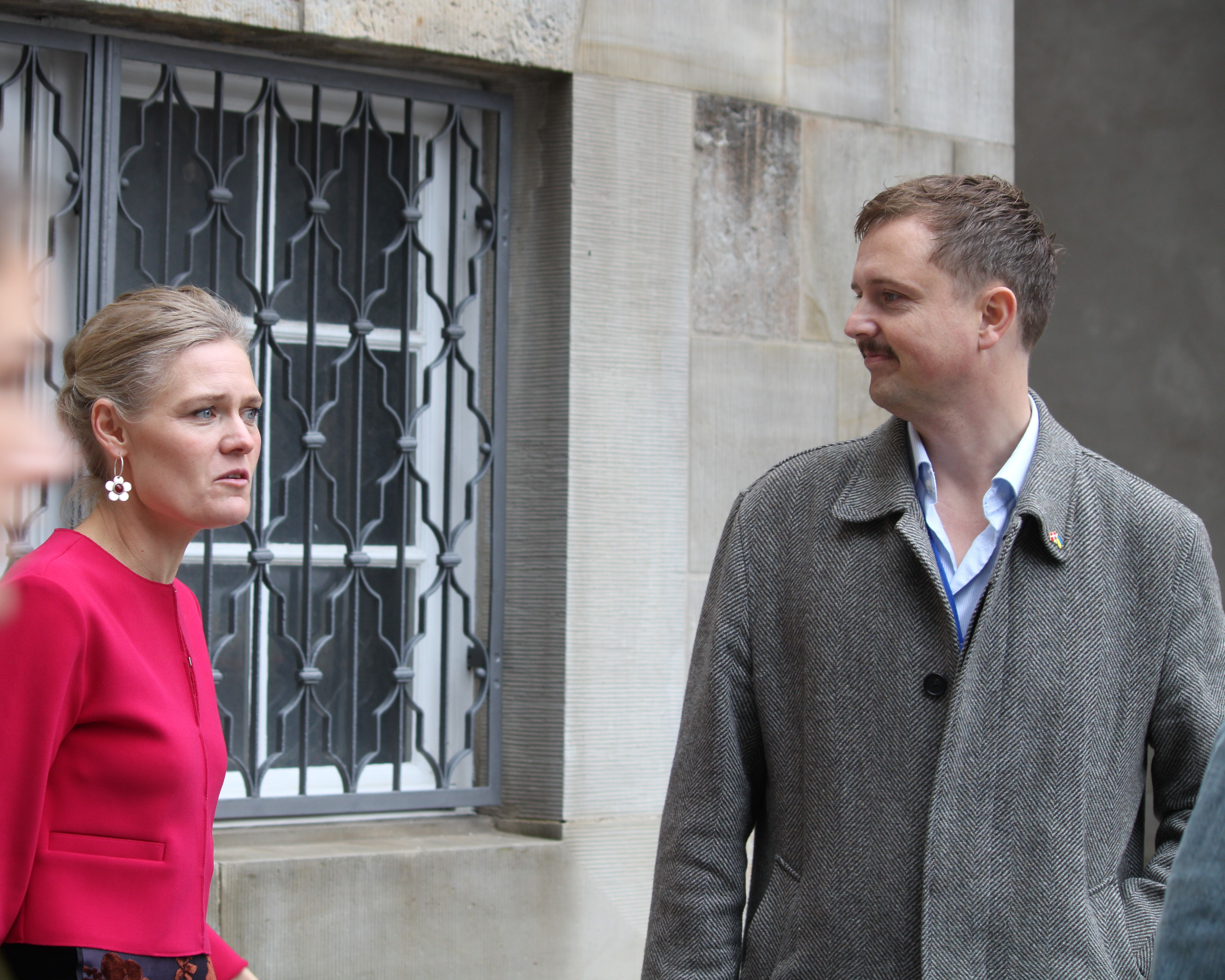
Stockmarr at the 2025 opening of the Folketing

She was nominated to the Danish Parliament for the Red–Green Alliance in the Lyngby constituency in 2021. In the 2022 parliamentary election, she received 5,362 votes in the Copenhagen Constituency (of which 1,927 were personal votes) and became the first deputy for the Red–Green Alliance in the constituency.

She ran for the municipal election in the Copenhagen Municipality in 2021 and received 514 personal votes in the election but was not elected.

From 22 November 2022 to 8 January 2023, Leila Stockmarr was a temporary member of the Folketing as a substitute for Rosa Lund, who was on sick leave with multiple sclerosis.

Jette Gottlieb announced in October 2024 that she would step down as a member of the Danish Parliament at the end of October to retire. Leila Stockmarr took over Gottlieb's parliamentary mandate.

== See also ==
- List of members of the Folketing, 2022–present
