= Laila Woozeer =

British author, musician and activist

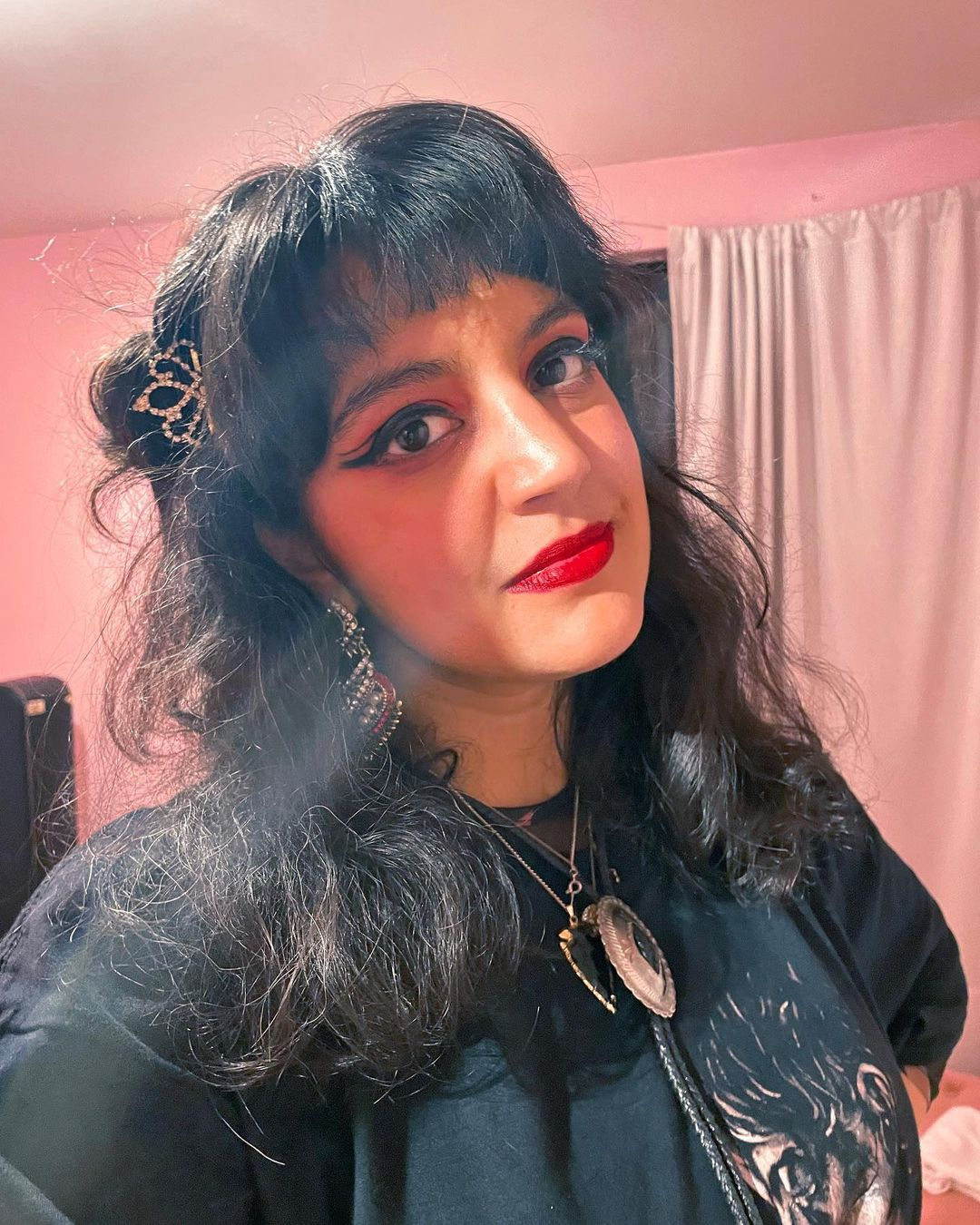
- Woozeer in 2022
- Education: Masters in Advanced Music Performance (University of London)
- Occupations: Author, musician
- Writing career
- Notable work: Not Quite White
- Website: www.lailawoozeer.com

Laila Woozeer is a British author, performer, musician, and activist. Woozeer's 2022 book, Not Quite White (published by Simon & Schuster) is a memoir described as "primarily focused on mixed-race identity and also looking at representation, structural racism, intergenerational trauma and interracial family relations." Woozeer has also written for Cosmopolitan, The Guardian, Eastern Eye, Metro, My London Shout Out UK and Marie Claire on race and identity. Woozeer is also a multi-instrumentalist who has worked in both theatre and musical theatre composing both original scores and soundtracks.

== Writing ==
=== Not Quite White ===
Woozeer's debut book, Not Quite White, was released on 23 June 2022, and published by Simon & Schuster. The book is a memoir that focusses on mixed race identity as well as representation, intergenerational trauma, structural racism, and interracial family relations. Excerpts from the book were published in Mashable and Wales Art Review. The book was featured in a list of best non-fiction books in Cosmopolitan and Stylist. The book began as a blog post on their blog TAPE PARADE.

=== Other writing ===
Woozeer has written for and been interviewed in The Guardian, Cosmopolitan, Eastern Eye, Metro, My London, Shout Out UK and Marie Claire on race and identity. In 2015, BuzzFeed republished a post written by Woozeer about using the online dating app Tinder as a non-white person. Woozeer previously wrote a blog called TAPE PARADE.

== Music ==
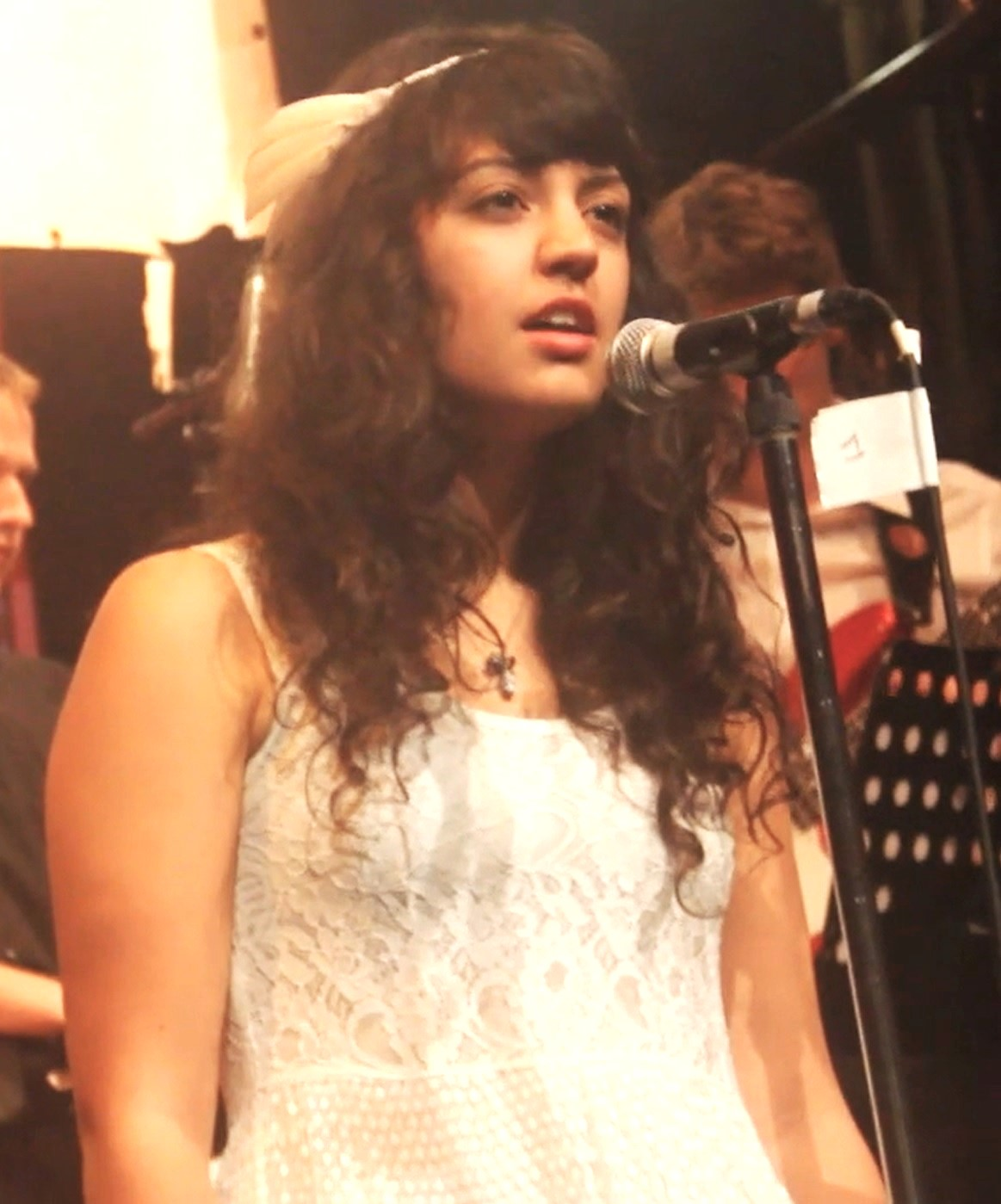
Woozeer singing in WOLF PACK in 2012

Woozeer is a multi-instrumentalist who has worked in both theatre and musical theatre composing both original scores and soundtracks. Woozeer primarily uses piano and voice, as well as playing guitar, ukulele, bassoon and clarinet. Woozeer has worked on several projects including:

- The Not Quite White book is part of a larger series of work which includes an EP of original songs and artwork.
- Heather And Harry: Woozeer was composer, actor, and musician for a collaboration with Stumble Trip Theatre.
- WOLF PACK: Woozeer was the creator, performer and produce of an award-winning performance-based collective
- QUIZCATS: Woozeer was the creator, arranger and performer for a live band karaoke, it included Disney-themed events named Quizney.
- A Strange Wild Song: Woozeer was composer, actor and musician in a show created with Rhum & Clay.
- In 2017 Woozeer was part of the group The Notables on Pitch Battle on BBC One.

== Activism ==
After being subjected to 'upskirting', Woozeer was interviewed on BBC and LBC radio as well as by Refinery29 about the experience and the campaign to make it illegal under The Voyeurism (Offences) Act.

== Education ==
Woozeer is a graduate of Goldsmiths, University of London and holds a Masters in Advanced Music Performance.

== Personal life ==
Woozeer lives in London and is vegan. Woozeer is Welsh, French, Scottish, American, Indian and Mauritian.

Woozeer is non-binary.
