= Navyug Ramlila and Dussehra Committee =

- Navyug Ramleela and Dusshera Committee
- नवयुग रामलीला एवं दशहरा कमेटी
- Abbreviation: NRDC
- Formation: 1979
- Headquarters: U.T. Chandigarh, India
- Secretary General: Deepak Kumar
- Chairman: Karanvir Singh
- Joint Secretary: Kailash Chander
- Director: Pradeep Rawat

Navyug Ramleela and Dussehra Committee is one of the oldest committees of Chandigarh; established in 1979 cater to the interests of new generation, has been organising Ramlila at Sector 7, Chandigarh. The Committee is being governed by the office bearers, elected out of dignitaries, prominent citizens, business people and other learned personalities. Keeping its existence as a reputed committee the members organises theatrical reenactment of Hindu God Rama's life, capturing his journey along with his wife Sita and brother Lakshmana, as he is exiled from his kingdom, his fight and eventual victory over demon king Ravana that is retold every year around this time to celebrate the triumph of good over evil, culminating on Dussehra.

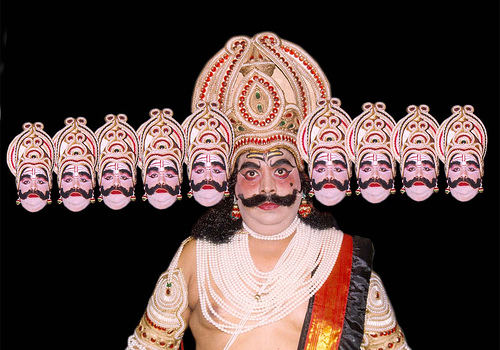
An Ramlila Actor In The Role of Ravana

In Northern India, with the advent of Navratras on 1st of Ashwin as per Hindu Calendar, the celebrations start with staging of Ram Lila's followed by Dussehra on tenth day and Bharat Milap on 11th Day where Coronation of Lord Ram is done by performing Raj Tilak and fire works.

It is believed that Goswami Tulsidas started the staging of Ramleela to preserve the Indian culture and moral values. The staging of the Ram Lila is based on the Ramacharitmanas, the sacred text to the glory of Rama, the hero of the Ramayana, was composed by Tulsidas in the sixteenth century. Ramleela, meaning "Rama's play", is a performance of the epic Ramayana in the form of a series of scenes that include song, narration, recital and dialogue.

The performance is enhanced by hi-tech sound systems and equipment, and LED screen. However, the artists are all traditional actors.

The artists of Ramlila Committee also took participation in Swachh Bharat Abhiyan, the cleanliness drive after the invitation by the Administrator of Chandigarh.

== Milestone ==
Committee celebrated

- Silver Jubilee in year 2004 (25th anniversary);
- Ruby Jubilee in year 2019 (40th anniversary) and continuously running since last 43 years, started from little and now it turn out to be enormous association.
