= Majnun-e Sofla =

Majnun-e Sofla مجنون سفلي
- Village
- Location within Iran
- Coordinates: 39°11′52″N 44°15′58″E
- Country: Iran
- Province: West Azerbaijan
- County: Chaldoran
- Bakhsh: Dashtaki
- Rural District: Avajiq-e Jonubi

Population (2006)
  - Total: 129
- Time zone: UTC+3:30 (IRST)
  - Summer (DST): UTC+4:30 (IRDT)

Majnun-e Sofla (Persian: مجنون سفلي, also Romanized as Majnūn-e Soflā) is a village in Avajiq-e Jonubi Rural District, Dashtaki District, Chaldoran County, West Azerbaijan Province, Iran. At the 2006 census, its population was 129, in 29 families.
