= Lelia =

Lelia or Lélia may refer to:

People

- Lélia Abramo (1911–2004), Italian-Brazilian actress and political activist
- Carmen Lelia Cristóbal (born before 1959), Argentine botanist
- Lelia Doolan (born 1941), Irish television and theatre producer
- Lelia Dromgold Emig (1872–1957), American genealogist and author
- Lelia Foley (born 1942), first African American woman to be elected mayor in the United States
- Lelia Goldoni (born 1936), American actress who appeared in motion pictures and on television
- Lélia Gonzalez (1935–94), Brazilian intellectual, politician, professor and anthropologist
- Lélia Gousseau (1909–1997), French classical pianist
- Lelia Green (born before 1994), Australian media theorist
- Lelia Masaga (born 1986), New Zealand rugby union player
- Lelia N. Morris (1862–1929), American hymnwriter
- Lelia J. Robinson (1850–91), American lawyer, the first woman to be admitted to the bar and to practice in the courts of Massachusetts
- Lelia P. Roby (1848–1910), American philanthropist; founder, Ladies of the Grand Army of the Republic
- Lelia Judson Tuttle (1878–1967), American missionary educator in China

Places

- Lake Lelia, a natural fresh water lake on the south side of Avon Park, Florida
- Lelia Lake, Texas, an unincorporated community in Donley County

Other

- Lélia, 1833 novel by George Sand
- PS Lelia, a steamship built during the American Civil War for the Confederate States of America
- Lelia (bug), a bug in subfamily Pentatominae

== See also ==
- A'Lelia Bundles (born 1952), African-American journalist
- A'Lelia Walker (1885–1931), American businesswoman and patron of the arts
- Layla (disambiguation)
- Leela (disambiguation)
- Leila (disambiguation)
- Lila (disambiguation)
