= Lilla Maldura =

Italian painter

Lilla Maldura (fl. 1876–1887) was a painter, mostly of domestic interiors and church interiors, but also landscapes, in oil and watercolor.

Maldura was born in Naples, of an Italian father and a Spanish mother. She studied under professor Federico Maldarelli, and later studied watercolor under professor Francesco Mancini. She often exhibited at the Promotrice of Naples. She also exhibited in London. Among her works is The Interior of the Chapel of the Immacolata in the church of the Gerolamini. She painted many landscapes of the Campania.
