= Leyla Tanlar =

Turkish actress and model (born 1997)

- Born: 13 December 1997 (age 28); Istanbul, Turkey
- Occupation: Actress
- Years active: 2014–present

Leyla Tanlar (born 13 December 1997) is a Turkish actress.

== Life and career ==
Tanlar was born in Istanbul on 13 December 1997. She is a graduate of the Liceo Italiano di Istanbul. She began acting in 2014 drama series Paramparça, portraying Cansu, at the age of 16. As of 2019, she continues her education at Koç University, Department of Media and Visual Arts. Following her training at the Akademi 35Buçuk, she started her acting career in 2014 with a role in the TV series Paramparça. In the same year, she received the 'Most Promising Actor Award' from Gelişim University. After appearing in a supporting role on the TV series Şahin Tepesi, Tanlar landed her first leading role on Fox's TV series Ferhat ile Şirin as the lead character Şirin. In December 2021, it reported that she would have a supporting role in the series Kaçış, which premiered on Disney+ in June 2022.

She has italian origins and she is italian citizen.

== Filmography ==
=== TV series ===
Year	Title	Role	Notes
2014–2017	Paramparça	Cansu Gürpınar	Leading role
2018	Mehmed: Bir Cihan Fatihi	Esleme	Supporting role
2018	Şahin Tepesi	Deniz Akdora	Leading role
2019	Ferhat ile Şirin	Şirin	Leading role
2022–2023	Güzel Günler	Selma	Leading role
2024–2025	Siyah Kalp	Sevilay Günser	Leading role

=== Web series ===
Year	Title	Role	Notes
2022	Kaçış	Nevi	Leading role
