= Lejla Basic =

Swedish footballer

Lejla Bašić
Personal information
- Date of birth: October 3, 1994 (age 32)
- Place of birth: Sweden
- Position: Midfielder

Senior career*
Years	Team	Apps	(Gls)
2013–2014	KIF Orebro	11	(0)
2014–2015	Alta	32	(3)
2016–2019	KIF Orebro	44	(3)

International career
2017	Bosnia and Herzegovina	1	(0)
- * Club domestic league appearances and goals as of 09:35, 21 May 2016 (UTC)

Lejla Bašić (born 3 October 1994) is a Swedish football midfielder who played for KIF Örebro DFF.

== Career ==
Basic began her career with KIF Örebro in 2013. She helped lead the club to promotion during the 2018 season.

Basic made one appearance for the Bosnia and Herzegovina women's national football team, a 1–2 defeat to Croatia in a friendly on 9 June 2017.
