= Lilas =

Lilas ليلاس
- Village
- Location within Iran
- Coordinates: 34°16′06″N 48°11′15″E
- Country: Iran
- Province: Hamadan
- County: Nahavand
- Bakhsh: Khezel
- Rural District: Solgi

Population (2006)
  - Total: 358
- Time zone: UTC+3:30 (IRST)
  - Summer (DST): UTC+4:30 (IRDT)

Lilas (Persian: ليلاس, also Romanized as Līlās, Lailās, and Leylās; also known as Līlān and Leylān) is a village in Solgi Rural District, Khezel District, Nahavand County, Hamadan Province, Iran. At the 2006 census, its population was 358, in 101 families.
