= Lela =

Lela may refer to:

== People ==
- Lela (footballer) (born 1962), Brazilian football player
- Lela Alston (born 1942), American politician
- Lela Autio (1927-2016), American modernist painter and sculptor
- Lela B. Njatin (born 1963), Slovene writer and visual artist
- Lela Bliss (1896-1980), American actress
- Lela Brooks (1908-1990), Canadian speed skater
- Lela Chichinadze (born 1988), Georgian footballer
- Lela Cole Kitson (1891-1970), American freelance writer
- Lela E. Buis, American writer, playwright, poet, and artist
- Lela E. Rogers (1891-1977), American journalist, film producer, film editor, and screenwriter
- Lela Evans, Canadian politician
- Lela Javakhishvili (born 1984), Georgian chess player
- Lela Karagianni (1898-1944), Greek resistance leader
- Lela Keburia (born 1976), Georgian politician and philologist
- Lela Lee, American actress and cartoonist
- Lela Loren (born 1980), American television and film actress
- Lela Mevorah (1898-1972), Serbian librarian and medicine professor
- Lela Murray (1887-1949), American businesswoman, community leader, and civil rights advocate
- Lela Pandak Lam (died 1877), current ruler of Rembau
- Lela Rochon (born 1964), American actress
- Lela Rose, American fashion designer
- Lela Swift (1919-2015), television director and producer
- Lela Tsurtsumia (born 1969), Georgian pop folk singer
- Lela Viola Barton (1901-1967), American botanist
- Lela Violão (1929-2009), Cape Verdean singer and composer

== Places ==
- Leľa, a village and municipality in the Nové Zámky District in the Nitra Region of south-west Slovakia
- Lela, Kenya, a small town in western Kenya near Lake Victoria

== Other uses ==
- Lela language, a Kainji language of Nigeria
- Lela (cannon), Malay cannon
