= Leľa =

Village and municipality in Slovakia

- Municipality
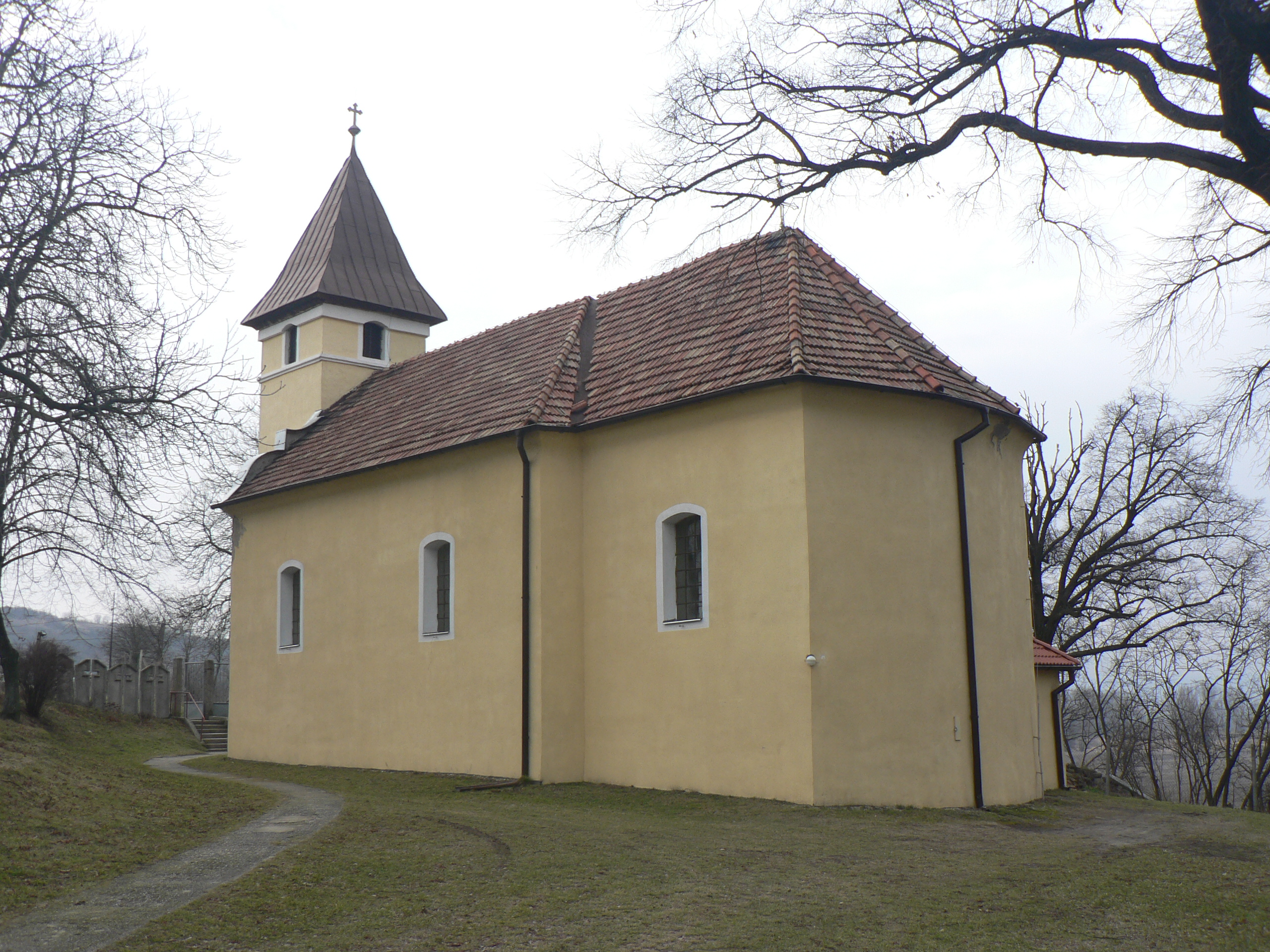

- Flag

- Location of Leľa in the Nitra Region Location of Leľa in Slovakia
- Coordinates: 47.85°N 18.78°E
- Country: Slovakia
- Region: Nitra Region
- District: Nové Zámky District
- First mentioned: 1262

Area
  - Total: 8.23 km^{2} (3.18 sq mi)
- Elevation: 127 m (417 ft)

Population (2025)
  - Total: 312
- Time zone: UTC+1 (CET)
  - Summer (DST): UTC+2 (CEST)
- Postal code: 943 65
- Area code: +421 36
- Vehicle registration plate (until 2022): NZ

Leľa (Hungarian: Leléd) is a village and municipality in the Nové Zámky District in the Nitra Region of south-west Slovakia.

== History ==
In historical records the village was first mentioned in 1262.

== Geography ==
The municipality lies at an altitude of 127 metres (417 ft) and covers an area of 8.23 km^{2} (3.18 sq mi) (2025).

== Population ==
Population statistic (10 years)
Year	1995	2005	2015	2025
Count	381	389	310	312
Difference		+2.09%	−20.30%	+0.64%

Population statistic
Year	2024	2025
Count	318	312
Difference		−1.88%

It has a population of 312 people (31 December 2025).

=== Ethnicity ===
Census 2021 (1+ %)
Ethnicity	Number	Fraction
Hungarian	263	85.38%
Slovak	53	17.2%
Not found out	6	1.94%
Total	308	

In year 2021 was 308 people by ethnicity 263 as Hungarian, 53 as Slovak, 6 as Not found out, 1 as Czech and 1 as German.

Note on population: The difference values of population numbers in the table "Population statistic" and in the sections "Ethnicity" & "Religion" is caused by the use of various statistical methods.

=== Religion ===
Census 2021 (1+ %)
Religion	Number	Fraction
Roman Catholic Church	266	86.36%
None	24	7.79%
Greek Catholic Church	7	2.27%
Calvinist Church	4	1.3%
Total	308	

In year 2021 was 308 people by religion 266 from Roman Catholic Church, 24 from None, 7 from Greek Catholic Church, 4 from Calvinist Church, 3 from Not found out, 3 from Evangelical Church and 1 from Jehovah's Witnesses.

== Facilities ==
The village has a public library and a football pitch.
