= Samba-enredo =

Sub-genre of samba

Samba de enredo
- Stylistic origins: Samba
- Cultural origins: Mid–1930s in Rio de Janeiro, Brazil
- Typical instruments: surdo; bombo; caixa-clara; pt:tarol; tamborim; cuíca; chocalho; reco-reco; pandeiro

Samba-enredo, also known as samba de enredo, is a sub-genre of modern samba made specifically by a samba school for the festivities of Brazilian Carnival. It is a samba style that consists of a lyric and a melody created from a theme chosen by a samba school.

The first sambas sung by the samba schools in their carnival presentations were freely created and generally were about of the samba itself or the reality of the samba musicians. The institution of contests between the Rio de Janeiro samba school from the 1930s onwards compelled them to commit themselves to presented themes, which began to narrate mainly episodes and exalt characters from the official Brazilian historiography.

== Background ==
"Samba-enredo" translates literally in Portuguese a samba-theme, which is thematically bonded to the selected special theme (enredo) of its samba school and narrates the story, which it told by the samba schools, in a lyrical form. Each samba school performs one song in the Carnaval parade. A new song must be written each year for each school; they must be on Brazilian topics. The Carnaval parade is among other things a samba competition, with judges, who rank the new sambas according to their perceived merit. Being by definition topical, sambas-enredo are seldom performed outside of the Carnaval environment. The samba-enredo is one of the criteria used by the Judging committee to decide who is the winner of the Carnaval parade competition. The samba-enredo must be well sung by the samba school's puxador (or singer) or the school will lose points. While the "puxador" (the samba-enredo singer) sings, everyone marching in the Carnaval parade sings the samba-enredo along with him, and harmony is another judging criterion.

For each samba school, choosing the following year's samba-enredo is a long process. Well in advance of the Carnaval parade, each samba school holds a contest for writing the song. The song is written by samba composers from within the school itself ("Ala dos Compositores"), or sometimes from outside composers, normally in "parcerias" (partnerships). Each school receives many—sometimes hundreds—songs, sometimes hundreds of them, each hoping to be the next samba-enredo for that year. The samba-enredo is written by these numerous composers mentioned above only after the Carnival Art Director, or "Carnavalesco", officially publishes the samba school's parade theme synopsis for the year. After a careful explanation of the parade-theme, many times done by the Carnival Art Director himself, composers may ask questions in order to clarify the synopsis, so they can start writing the samba-enredos.

== Sources ==
- Marcondes, Marcos Antônio, ed. (1977). Enciclopédia da música brasileira – erudita, folclórica e popular (in Brazilian Portuguese). Vol. 2 (1ª ed.). São Paulo: Art Ed.
- Lopes, Nei; Simas, Luiz Antonio (2015). Dicionário da História Social do Samba (in Brazilian Portuguese) (2ª ed.). Rio de Janeiro: Civilização Brasileira.
