= Leela =

Leela may refer to:

== Business ==
- The Leela Group, an Indian business conglomerate
- The Leela Palaces, Hotels and Resorts, an Indian luxury hotel group

== Fictional characters ==
- Leela (Doctor Who), on the British science fiction series Doctor Who
- Leela (Marathon), on first video game by Bungie, Marathon
- Leela (Futurama), on the animated television series Futurama
- Leela Lomax, on the British soap opera Hollyoaks
- Leela, a human character on Sesame Street
- Leela, granddaughter of Akela in Rudyard Kipling's The Jungle Book

== Film ==
- Leela (2002 film), a drama directed by Somnath Sen
- Leela (2016 film), an Indian Malayalam-language film directed by Ranjith
- Ek Paheli Leela (Leela: A Mystery), a 2015 Indian thriller film

== People ==
- Leela (name), including a list of people with the given name or surname
- Dadi Leela (1916–2017), Pakistani educationist, music teacher, philanthropist and politician born Leelavati Harchandani

== Other uses ==
- Leela (game), a board game with origins in ancient India
- Leela (software), computer Go software
- Leela Chess Zero, an open-source chess-playing program
- Lila (Hinduism), an alternate transliteration for the Hindu cosmological concept
- Leela, a 1999 book of poetry by Navtej Bharati and Ajmer Rode

== See also ==
- Leela attitude, a pose of the walking Buddha in Thai art
- Layla (disambiguation)
- Leila (disambiguation)
- Lelia (disambiguation)
- Lila (disambiguation)
- Lilan (disambiguation)
- Krishna Leela (disambiguation)
- Leelai, a 2012 Indian film
