= Zeller (surname) =

Zeller is a German surname. Notable people with the surname include:

== Zeller ==
- Adolf Guyer-Zeller (1839–1899), Swiss entrepreneur
- Adrien Zeller (1940–2009), French politician
- Alfred Zeller (1909–1988), American illustrator and painter
- André Zeller (1898–1979), French general
- August Zeller (1863–1918), American sculptor and teacher
- Bart Zeller (born 1941), American baseball player and coach
- Belle Zeller (1903–1998), American political scientist
- Benjamin E. Zeller, American academic
- Bill Zeller (1983–2011), American computer programmer, best known for MyTunes
- Carl Zeller (1842–1898), Austrian operetta composer
- Christian Zeller (1822–1899), German minister and creator of Zeller's congruence
- Christoph Zeller (born c. 1956), Liechtenstein billionaire businessman
- Christopher Zeller (born 1984), German field hockey player
- Cody Zeller (born 1992), American basketball player, brother of Luke and Tyler
- Dave Zeller (1939–2020), American basketball player
- Dóra Zeller (born 1995), Hungarian footballer
- Eduard Zeller (1814–1908), German philosopher
- Ella Zeller (1933–2025), Romanian table tennis player, coach and administrator
- Erich Zeller (1920–2001), German figure skater and coach
- Ernie Zeller (1909–1987), American football player
- Eva Zeller (1923–2022), German poet
- Florian Zeller (born 1979), French novelist and playwright
- Fred Zeller (1912–2003), French painter and politician
- Fred R. Zeller (1899–1978), American politician
- Fuzzy Zeller (born 1951), American golfer
- Gary Zeller (1947–1996), American basketball player
- Harry Zeller (1919–2004), American basketball player
- Heidi Zeller-Bähler (born 1967), Swiss skier
- Henri Zeller (1896–1971), French general and Resistance figure
- Jack Zeller (1883–1969), American baseball player and executive
- Jerry Zeller (1898–1968), American football player
- Jo Zeller (born 1955), Swiss racing driver
- Joachim Zeller (1952–2023), German politician
- Joe Zeller (1908–1983), American football player
- Johann Gottfried Zeller (1656–1734), German physicist and medical writer
- John Zeller (1830–1902), German missionary
- Joseph Zeller (1918–2018), American politician
- Julius C. Zeller (1871–1938), American Methodist clergyman, educator, and Mississippi senator
- Jules Sylvain Zeller (1820–1900), French historian
- Karl Longin Zeller (1924–2006), German mathematician
- Katrin Zeller (born 1979), German cross country skier
- Ludwig Zeller (1927–2019), Chilean poet and surreal visual artist
- Luke Zeller (born 1987), American basketball player, brother of Cody and Tyler
- Marcel Zeller (1973–2016), German boxer
- Maria Isabel Wittenhall van Zeller (1749–1819), pioneer of smallpox vaccination in Portugal
- Martha Zeller (1918–2014), Mexican singer
- Philipp Zeller (born 1983), German field hockey player
- Philipp Christoph Zeller (1808–1883), German entomologist
- Sam Zeller, American physicist
- Sandro Zeller (born 1991), Swiss race car driver
- Sanford Myron Zeller (1885–1948), American mycologist
- Tom Zeller Jr. (born 1969), American journalist
- Toni Zeller (1909–?), German cross-country skier
- Tyler Zeller (born 1990), American basketball player, brother of Cody and Luke
- Walter Zeller (motorcyclist) (1928–1995), German motorcycle racer
- Walter P. Zeller (1890–1957), Canadian businessman, founder of retail chain Zellers
- Wolfgang Zeller (1893–1967), German composer noted for his film music

== van Zeller ==
- Dom Hubert van Zeller (1905–1984), Benedictine writer, sculptor, and (under the name Brother Choleric) cartoonist
- Mariana van Zeller (born 1976), Portuguese journalist and correspondent
