= Zellers (surname) =

Zellers is a surname. Notable people with the surname include:

- Kurt Zellers (born 1969), American politician in Minnesota
- Will Zellers (born 2006), American ice hockey player

== See also ==
- Zeller
