= Israel Kugler =

American historian (1917–2007)

Israel Kugler (June 13, 1917 – October 1, 2007) was an American professor of sociology. In the 1960s, he helped organize faculty at a number of New York City-area colleges and universities into labor unions. He co-founded the Professional Staff Congress, a union of faculty at the City University of New York (CUNY) which now represents more than 20,000 faculty and staff members at the university.

== Early life ==
Kugler was born on June 13, 1917, in Brooklyn, New York City, to Philip and Anna (Senitzer) Kugler. He and his sister were raised in a liberal Jewish home in Brooklyn. He graduated with a bachelor's degree from the City College of New York in 1938. He took an active interest in socialist and Jewish politics, often spending entire days in "the counterpart of a floating crap game—only our dice were political arguments on all issues affecting the world."

He served in the United States Navy during World War II and returned to school to earn a doctorate in sociology at New York University.

Kugler married the former Helen Barkan in 1941. They had two children, Daniel and Philip.

== Union career ==
Kugler became a professor of social science at New York City Community College, where he earned a reputation as a skilled classroom educator. He also became heavily involved in labor politics in the city, and supported organizing drives for many unions. Kugler joined the United Federation of College Teachers (UFCT), Local 1460 of the American Federation of Teachers (AFT). Kugler eventually was elected president of the union, which had been founded in 1935.

Kugler was a leader among a group of delegates of the American Federation of Teachers who sought to force the national union to end its practice of chartering segregated locals. The union had amended its constitution in 1953 to bar segregated locals, but had done little to enforce the provision. In 1954, Kugler and others demanded that the union suspend the charters of locals that barred black teachers from membership. Although a resolution passed, president Carl J. Megel and other national union officers argued that the resolution and constitution provision did not "require" suspension. The following year, Kugler led the anti-segregation forces in yet another resolution battle, which led to passage of a policy which unequivocably required ejection of locals which discriminated on the basis of race. A number of locals in the Deep South withdrew from the union rather than be suspended, including Local 89 in Atlanta (the first AFT local where 100 percent of the teachers in the bargaining unit had joined the local). In all, the American Federation of Teachers lost close to 5 percent of its membership.

=== St. John's University strike ===
Kugler led a strike at St. John's University in 1966, which led to the establishment of the American Federation of Teachers as a leader in the unionization of faculty and staff in higher education. In the fall of 1965, 31 faculty members at St. John's University were dismissed without due process or any hearing. Both the American Association of University Professors (AAUP) and the UFCT claimed the university had violated the professors' academic freedom. St. John's, the two groups said, demanded that the faculty restrict their teaching to a narrow, dogmatic approach to Thomism and required faculty to submit all articles and books to the administration for clearance before seeking publication. The Rev. Joseph T. Cahill, president of St. John's, said the teachers had used their classrooms for propaganda purposes. Kugler pushed for a more radical response to the dispute, calling for a strike to begin in January 1966 and widening the dispute to include pay and benefits (faculty pay was the lowest of the ten largest Catholic universities in the U.S.) The strike at St. John's began on January 4, 1966. The union pushed for mediation and arbitration in December 1965, but the university refused to submit to either. Using tactics pioneered by Albert Shanker to win collective bargaining rights for New York City public school teachers, Kugler pushed for local and state government officials to get involved in the dispute. Only a minority of St. John's faculty walked out, forcing the university to close some but not a majority of classes. During the next two years, Kugler challenged the university's accreditation before the Middle States Association of Colleges and Schools twice. But that body only warned the university and took no further action. The union raised $250,000 from the Workmen's Circle and other organizations to support the striking faculty. Kugler took professors' case to the Vatican and sought an individual audience with Pope Paul VI, whose encyclicals on workers' rights were repeatedly cited by the union. But the pope refused him an audience. In the early spring of 1967, as the strike threatened to widen to other Catholic universities in the country and state legislators opened hearings on the labor dispute, the university agreed to arbitration. The strike ended in June 1967. The union did not win recognition at St. John's, and in 1970 arbitrators ruled that the university had not acted improperly.

Kugler later wrote a well-regarded article about the strike, "The 1966 Strike at St. John's University: A Memoir," which was published in Labor's Heritage in 1997.

=== Formation of the PSC ===
Although the strike was a failure in that it did not win reinstatement for the faculty, the strike established the American Federation of Teachers as the pre-eminent union organizing American higher education faculty. Kugler quickly turned the UFCT's attention to other colleges and universities in the New York City area. In the next few years, under his leadership the union organized locals at the Fashion Institute of Technology (FIT), Nassau Community College and Westchester Community College. In 1967, faculty at FIT bargained a signed collective bargaining agreement—the first time a public higher education union in the state signed a contract. FIT's contract was only the second public higher education contract in the whole country.

In 1967, Kugler began pushing for the UFCT to organize the faculty at the City University of New York. Backed by the American Federation of Teachers and the newly formed (and politically powerful) United Federation of Teachers, UFCT not only won an agreement for a union election but won the December 6, 1968, election in the face of a determined challenge from the AAUP. The union won a second election (this time for non-tenured faculty) nine days later, and a signed contract nine months later. The City University of New York promptly attempted to break the contract by firing 100 untenured faculty members in December 1969. Kugler responded with aggressive picketing which forced the university to rescind its actions.

In 1972, Kugler merged the UFCT with its long-time rival, the Legislative Conference of the City University. Kugler and Dr. Belle Zeller, president of the Legislative Conference, agreed to form a new organization affiliated with the American Federation of Teachers, the Professional Staff Congress (PSC). CUNY challenged the right of the PSC to represent its faculty, forcing the PSC into yet another election. The PSC won this second election on June 7, 1972. After a year of negotiations and a threatened strike, City University of New York consented to a three-year collective bargaining agreement. As of 2007, the PSC represented more than 20,000 faculty and staff members at CUNY.

Kugler was elected Deputy Vice President of the PSC after its formation, but retired in 1980.

Israel Kugler died of pneumonia at his home in Chevy Chase, Maryland, on October 1, 2007.

== Memberships ==
Kugler was at one time the president of the Three Arrows Cooperative Society, a member of National Committee of Social Democrats USA, a member of the National Executive Board of the Workmen's Circle/Arbeter Ring, a member of the executive committee of the Jewish Labor Committee, and a founding member of the Health Care Industry Council of the Labor and Employment Relations Association

He also at one time had been a board member of the League for Industrial Democracy.

== Selected publications ==
- "A Life in the Workmen's Circle: Reminiscence and Reflection." Labor's Heritage. 3:4 (October 1991).
- "The AAUP at the Crossroads." Changing Education. Spring 1966.
- From Ladies to Women: The Organized Struggle for Women's Rights in the Reconstruction Era. Westport, Ct.: Greenwood Press, 1987. ISBN 0-313-25239-4
- "Status, Power, and Educational Freedom." Journal of Educational Sociology. 25:9 (May 1952).
- "The 1966 Strike at St. John's University: A Memoir." Labor's Heritage. 9:2 (Fall 1997).
- "The Trade Union Career of Susan B. Anthony." Labor History. 11 (Winter 1961).
- "Two Views of Albert Shanker." New Politics. 7:1 (New Series) (Summer 1998).
