= Bruno Fischer =

American writer (1908–1992)

Bruno Fischer (29 June 1908 – 16 March 1992) was a German-born American author of weird and crime fiction.

== Biography ==
=== Early career ===
The son of a grocer, Fischer was born in Berlin, Germany, on 29 June 1908. Bruno immigrated to the United States with his family in 1913, attending high school in Long Island. He later attended the Rand School of Social Science and married Ruth Miller, a secretary, in 1934. Fischer became a sports reporter and then police reporter for the Long Island Daily Press (1929–31), following this with stints of writing and editing at the Labor Voice (1931–32), Socialist Call (1934–36), and Modern Monthly.

In the 1936 election he ran as a candidate for New York's 14th district, and in 1938 he ran for the New York State Senate (12th district, Manhattan), both times under the Socialist banner.

=== Writing career ===
With journalism providing an unreliable income, at a friend's recommendation Fischer tried his hand at writing for the pulps. Among the hundreds of pulp titles available at that time, Fischer was taken by the horror/terror titles, the so-called "shudder pulps:" Dime Mystery, Terror Tales, Sinister Stories, and others. He sold his first story immediately, a horror tale ("The Cat Woman", Dime Mystery, November 1936). While he often wrote under his own name, this first story and others came out under the pseudonym "Russell Gray", a name he had used during his newspaper days when writing two pieces for the same edition. Other pulp stories appeared under the pen name Harrison Storm, but he no longer used this pseudonym after 1943. Initially Fischer became known as a purveyor of stories within the "weird menace" and "defective detective" subgenres, the latter being detectives with distinctive physical flaws. However, as Fischer recalled, these markets ended quite suddenly:

In 1940 I was living in Florida with my family when the whole terror-horror market collapsed.... I got a letter saying the magazines had folded, and all my unpublished stories were returned. They just stopped, just like that. It was a shock. Just one day the market was gone.

With his original markets gone, he moved to more general detective and crime fiction, with stories appearing in Dime Detective, Black Mask, and others. Ultimately he published several hundred stories, claiming to have written some two million words of fiction from 1937 to 1941 alone.

Fischer published his first novel, So Much Blood, in 1939. As the pulps died off in the late 40s and early 50s, novels became his primary output, though several of his short stories still appeared in the digest magazines (like Manhunt and Mike Shayne Mystery Magazine) that were the pulps' successor. Several of his books were published by Dell and Lion Books, including the popular Ben Helm series of P. I. novels. Paperback-original publishing house Gold Medal Books took on Fischer on the recommendation of John D. MacDonald. Gold Medal released several of his novels in the 1950s; House of Flesh (Gold Medal #123, 1950) sold some 1.8 million copies. An early member of the Mystery Writers of America, he was the editor of one of their annual short story collections, 1953's Crooks' Tour, and author Ed Lynskey states that Fischer wrote at least one erotic novel in 1970 (Domination, Olympia/Ophelia Press) under the pen name "Jason F. Storm".

In the 1960s Fischer worked as executive editor for Collier Books and education editor at the Arco Publishing Company. His last novel was 1973's The Evil Days, written after the demands of his job and a lengthy writer's block had greatly reduced his output. Following this he spent his later years between a summer home in a socialist cooperative community in New York's Putnam County (the Three Arrows Cooperative Society) and the Mexican town of San Miguel de Allende, where he sometimes gave lectures to the expatriate retirees about his adventures as a mystery writer. Nearly blind towards the end of his life, he died of a stroke while on a Mexican vacation with his wife on 16 March 1992.

Critic Anthony Boucher once wrote that Fischer displayed "a warm understanding of human relationships". Fischer himself described his "usual manner" of writing as containing "movement and suspense with very little violence" and as being about "ordinary people in extraordinary situations". His novels sold some 10 million copies and his works were translated into 12 languages, but by the time of his death he had largely faded into obscurity like many crime writers of his era. Modern releases of his books have been made by Stark House Press, while two volumes of his short story work as Russell Gray have been released by Ramble House.

== Bibliography ==
Novels
| by | genre | title | year | P.I. | comment |
|---|---|---|---|---|---|
| Bruno Fischer | MY | So Much Blood | 1939 |
| Bruno Fischer | MY | Stairway to Death | - | | re-release of So Much Blood |
| Bruno Fischer | MY | The Hornet's Nest | 1944 |
| Bruno Fischer | MY | Quoth the Raven | 1944 |
| Bruno Fischer | MY | Croaked the Raven | - | | re-release of Quoth the Raven |
| Bruno Fischer | MY | The Fingered Man | - | | re-release of Quoth the Raven |
| Bruno Fischer | MY | Kill to Fit | 1946 |
| Bruno Fischer | MY | The Pigskin Bag | 1946 |
| Bruno Fischer | MY | The Spider Lily | 1946 |
| Bruno Fischer | MY | The Bleeding Scissors | 1948 |
| Bruno Fischer | MY | The Scarlet Scissors | - | | re-release of The Bleeding Scissors |
| Russell Gray | MY | The Lustful Ape | 1950 | | by Lion Books |
| Bruno Fischer | MY | The Lustful Ape | 1950 | | by Gold Medal |
| Bruno Fischer | MY | House of Flesh | 1950 |
| Bruno Fischer | MY | Fools Walk In | 1951 |
| Bruno Fischer | MY | The Lady Kills | 1951 |
| Bruno Fischer | MY | The Fast Buck | 1952 |
| Bruno Fischer | MY | Run for Your Life | 1953 |
| Bruno Fischer | MY | Coney Island Incident | 1953 Nov. | | short version of So Wicked My Love in Manhunt |
| Bruno Fischer | MY | So Wicked My Love | 1954 |
| Bruno Fischer | MY | Knee-Deep in Death | 1956 |
| Bruno Fischer | MY | Murder in the Raw | 1957 |
| Bruno Fischer | MY | Second-Hand Nude | 1959 |
| Bruno Fischer | MY | The Girl Between | 1960 |
| Bruno Fischer | MY | The Evil Days | 1973 |
| Bruno Fischer | MY | The Dead Men Grin | 1945 | Ben Helm |
| Bruno Fischer | MY | More Deaths Than One | 1947 | Ben Helm |
| Bruno Fischer | MY | The Restless Hands | 1949 Summer | Ben Helm | short version in Mystery Book Magazine |
| Bruno Fischer | MY | The Restless Hands | 1949 | Ben Helm |
| Bruno Fischer | MY | The Angels Fell | 1950 | Ben Helm |
| Bruno Fischer | MY | The Flesh Was Cold | - | Ben Helm | re-release of The Angels Fell |
| Bruno Fischer | MY | The Silent Dust | 1950 | Ben Helm |
| Bruno Fischer | MY | The Paper Circle | 1951 | Ben Helm |
| Bruno Fischer | MY | Stripped for Murder | - | Ben Helm | re-release of The Paper Circle |
| Bruno Fischer | MY | The Dead Men Grin | 1946 Sep. | Ben Helm | in Two Complete Detective Books |
| Bruno Fischer | MY | The Quiet Woman | 1955 Jan. | Ben Helm | in Dell Mystery Novels Magazine |
| Bruno Fischer | MY | Death Attends Rehearsal | 1962 Oct. | Ben Helm | re-release of The Quiet Woman, in Mike Shayne's Mystery Magazine |
| Jason F. Storm | ER | Domination | 1970 | | in Ophelia Press |
