= Three Arrows Cooperative Society =

American intentional community (1936-)

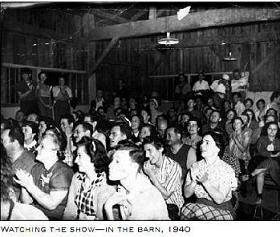
Photo from a community meeting in the Barn at Three Arrows, in 1940.

Three Arrows Cooperative Society is a cooperative summer colony located in Putnam Valley, New York. It was founded in 1936 by members of the Young People's Socialist League, from whence its name and emblem derive. The Society owns 125 acres of land which comprise 75 individual home sites as well as several communal buildings and access to Barger Pond. The colony, sometimes known as Camp Three Arrows, was imbued with socialist and communitarian values and offers a wide range of cultural, educational and leisure activities.

Notable Three Arrows members include author Bruno Fischer, labor leader Israel Kugler, political activist Samuel H. Friedman and poet Peretz Kaminsky. The Socialist Party of America held its annual conventions at Three Arrows and the Three Arrows Social Hall is named for its perennial presidential candidate Norman Thomas, a regular visitor. Historically many Three Arrows members were active in progressive political organizations including the Arbeiter Ring, the Jewish Labor Committee and the League for Industrial Democracy as well as many aspects of the Labor Movement. The Student League for Industrial Democracy, later known as Students For A Democratic Society or SDS, held meetings at Three Arrows during the 1950s and early 60s.

Three Arrows is member-run, with no paid staff other than an onsite caretaker and some teenage lifeguards during the summer months. There is an elaborate system of committees, with each member expected to serve on one or more committees and perform the work required to maintain the cooperative. As in other cooperatives, members own shares in the society rather than holding title to their individual sites.

Three Arrows continues as a summer community whose membership includes descendants of the founders as well as others attracted the location and community life.

== See also ==
- Three Arrows
