= Elgin, Texas =

- City
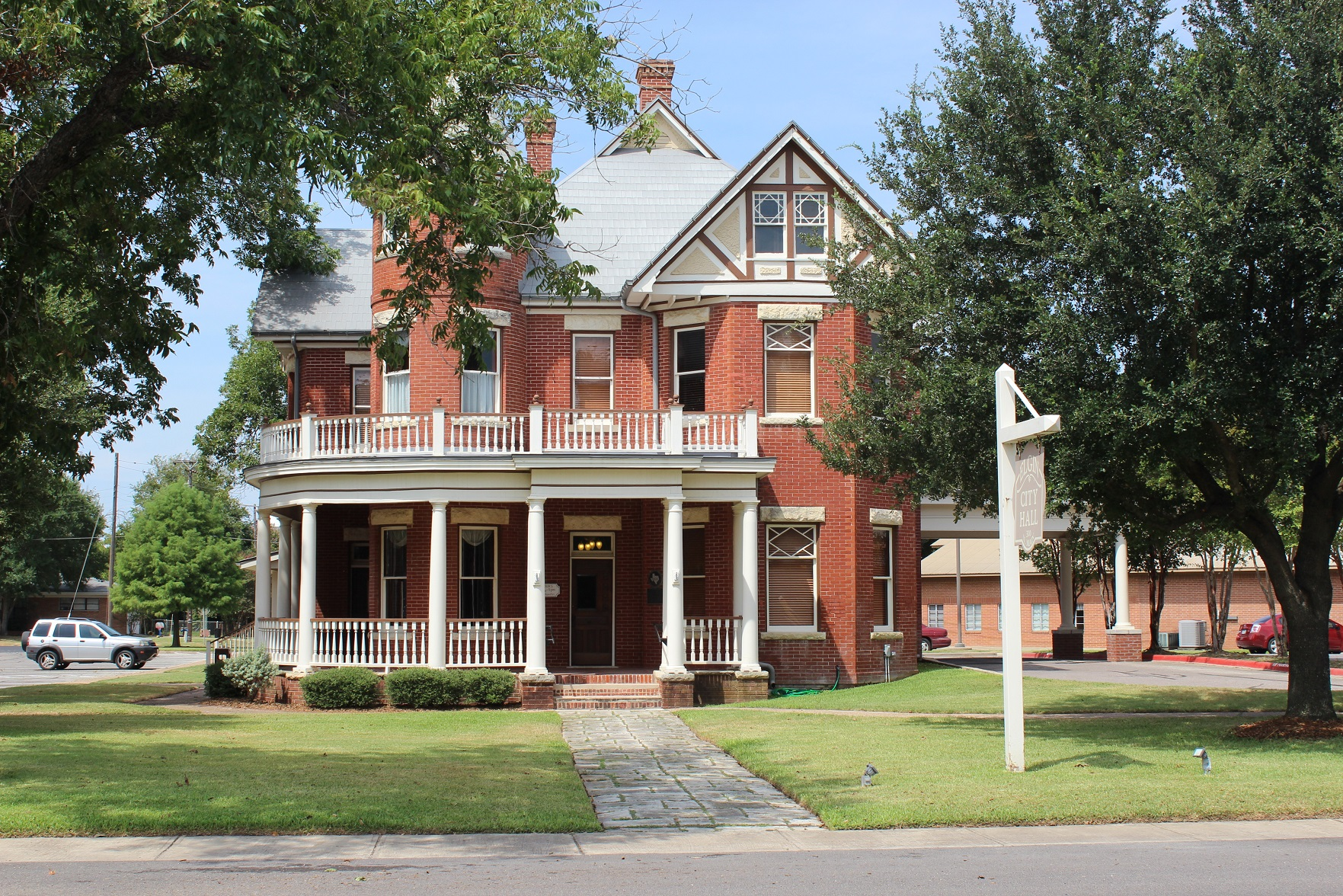
- Elgin City Hall is located in the historic Dr. I. B. Nofsinger House
- Nicknames: Brick Capital of the Southwest; Sausage Capital of Texas
- Motto: "Perfectly Situated"
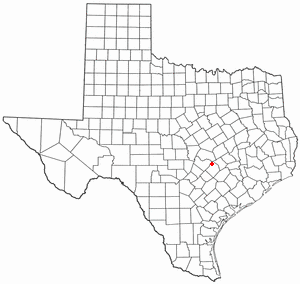
- Location of Elgin, Texas

- Coordinates: 30°20′55″N 97°22′21″W
- Country: United States
- State: Texas
- Counties: Bastrop, Travis
- Incorporated: 1901

Government
  - Type: Home Rule, Council-Manager form
  - Mayor-at-Large: Theresa McShan
  - City Council: City Council: Juan Gonzalez, Mayor Pro-Tem Ward 2; Jessica Bega, Ward 1; Mary Penson, Ward 1; Susie Arreaga, Ward 2 - Appointed; Craig Fromme, Ward 3; Phillip Thomas, Ward 3; Sue Brashar, Ward 4; Keith Joesel, Ward 4

Area
  - Total: 6.62 sq mi (17.15 km^{2})
  - Land: 6.62 sq mi (17.15 km^{2})
  - Water: 0 sq mi (0.00 km^{2})
- Elevation: 581 ft (177 m)

Population (2020)
  - Total: 9,784
  - Density: 1,557.9/sq mi (601.49/km^{2})
- Time zone: UTC-6 (Central (CST))
  - Summer (DST): UTC-5 (CDT)
- ZIP code: 78621
- Area code(s): 512 & 737
- FIPS code: 48-23044
- GNIS feature ID: 1373617
- Website: www.elgintexas.gov

Elgin (/ˈɛlɡɪn/ EL-ghin) is a city in Bastrop County and Travis County in the U.S. state of Texas. The population was 9,784 at the 2020 census.

In 1995, the Texas Legislature proclaimed Elgin the "Sausage Capital of Texas". Elgin is also known as the Brick Capital of the Southwest due to the presence of three operating brickyards in the mid-20th century (two of which are still open).

== History ==
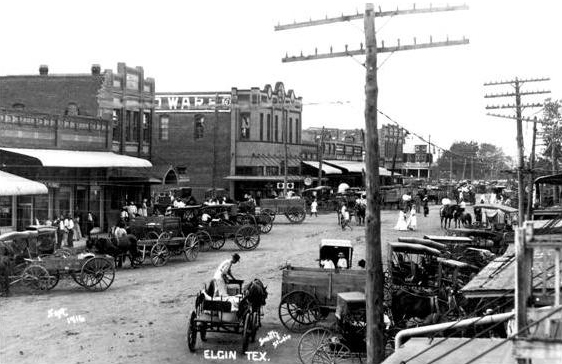
Downtown Elgin in 1916

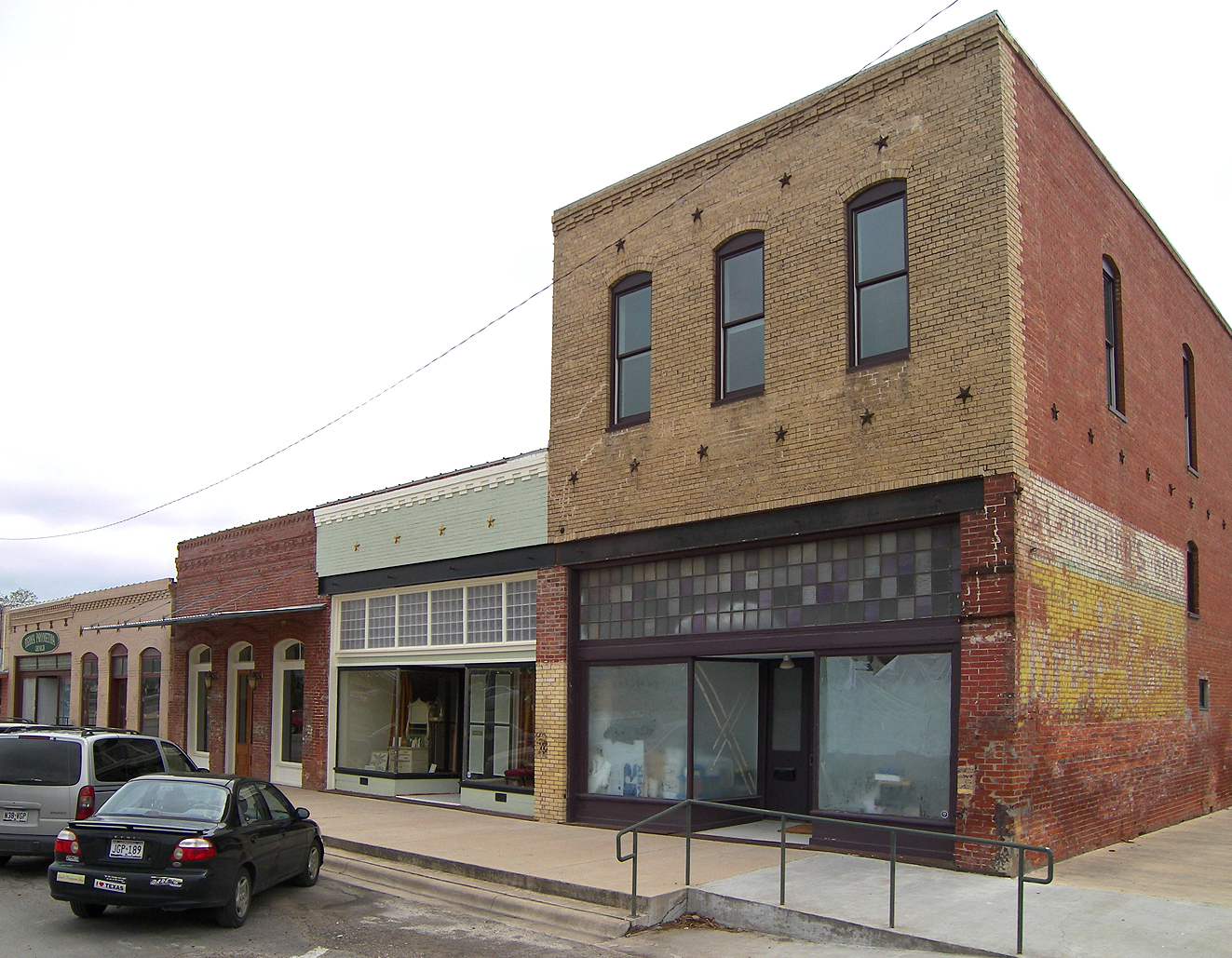
Elgin Commercial Historic District

In 1871, the Houston and Texas Central Railroad (succeeded by the Southern Pacific Transportation Company) built through the area and established a flag stop called Glasscock named for George W. Glasscock, a local resident and Republic of Texas soldier who lived in the area in the 1830s. Glasscock was renamed on August 18, 1872, for Robert Morris Elgin, the railroad's land commissioner, following the practice of naming new railroad towns after officers of the company. Elgin was established. The original plat placed the train depot in the center of a one-square-mile area.

The original plan for the Houston and Texas Central Railroad was to have run from McDade, 10 miles (16 km) east of Elgin, southwest to the Colorado River at a point somewhere between Bastrop and Webberville, then to Austin following the river. These plans, however, were thwarted due to a major flood of the Colorado River in 1869, hence the rerouting of the railroad through what is now Elgin.

Elgin was incorporated, received a post office in 1873, and a Baptist Sunday school began meeting in a private home. Much of the town's early population was drawn from nearby Perryville, which the railroad had bypassed. Perryville, or Hogeye as it was nicknamed, was located 2.5 miles (4.0 km) to the south. The town was known by three different names: the name Young's Settlement was chosen, probably in honor of the Michael Young family; Perryville, possibly for Perry Young, who was Michael Young's son; and Hogeye. The post office was officially named Young's Settlement, and the churches and Masonic Lodge carried the name Perryville. The name Hogeye was given to the stage stop at the Litton home where dances were held and, according to legend, the fiddler knew only one tune: "Hogeye", which he played over and over as the crowd danced on the puncheon floor.

In 1879, Elgin was described as a "thriving depot town" of 400. It had a newspaper, a gin, and a gristmill. Three years later Methodists erected the first church building in town. In 1884, Elgin had five general stores, two druggists, three cotton gins, and a saloon; that year, Thomas O'Conner started a brick-making enterprise that eventually led Elgin to adopt the epithet "Brick Capital of the Southwest." In 1885, a group of citizens met in Elgin to organize a new north–south railroad which would run from Taylor, the rail head for the Missouri, Kansas and Texas ("Katy") Railroad 16 miles (26 km) to the north, through Elgin to Bastrop, the county seat, 16 miles (26 km) to the south. The Taylor, Elgin, and Bastrop Railroad was formed in 1886 and began building the line. That same year, the "Katy" acquired the line and continued the construction on to Houston. Thus, Elgin became the beneficiary of two major rail lines with eight passenger trains daily, adding to Elgin's business as a shipping point for cotton, wool, and livestock. By 1890, Elgin had a population of 1,100 and supported two hotels, a broom factory, two doctors, a dentist, and the Elgin Courier newspaper. The following year oil was discovered 5 miles (8 km) southeast of town, but the strike was not large. Coal proved better for the economy, when the large coal belt nearby was mined in the early 20th century, bringing Latin-Americans and African-Americans to the area, as both free and slave labor.

The year 1900 resulted in a bumper crop of cotton and Elgin prospered. Elgin grew slowly but steadily through the 20th century, from 1,258 in 1904 to 4,846 in 1990. The city incorporated in 1901, electing Charles Gillespie, building contractor, as mayor, as well as J.D. Hemphill as marshal, W.E. McCullough, J. Wed Davis, Ed Lawhon, Max Hirach, and F.S. Wade as aldermen. Local law enforcement was established to enforce newly established civil and criminal codes. By 1910, Elgin was enjoying a period of great prosperity as families from out on the prairie and surrounding communities moved to town and built nice homes.

By 1940, Elgin was also the site of two big brick and tile plants. Elgin enterprise was stimulated during World War II by the proximity of the army training facility Camp Swift. A third brick company was established in the town in the mid-1950s, lured by the high-quality clay deposits in the area. In addition to the brick plants, a local sausage factory processed thousands of pounds of beef and pork a week; Elgin Hot Sausage continued to enjoy a widespread reputation, and Elgin rapidly became the most important agricultural center in Bastrop County. Five cotton gins and a cotton oil mill were in operation at the same time. Other industries included feed and grain processing and hydraulic press manufacturing.

By the 1980s, proximity to Austin had begun to attract commuters to Elgin. In the mid-1980s, the Elgin Courier was still being published, the sausage had achieved wider fame, and two brick and tile plants were still in operation. Elgin was also the site of a furniture plant and a leather works.

The eastern side of town was heavily damaged by a high-end EF2 tornado on March 21, 2022.

In 2022, city voters approved the decriminalization of possession of misdemeanor amounts of marijuana.

== Geography ==
Elgin is located 25 miles (40 km) east of downtown Austin and 18 miles (29 km) north of Bastrop, at the intersection of U.S. Highway 290 and State Highway 95. Most of the city lies in Bastrop County, with a portion extending westward into Travis and Williamson Counties. Most of north Elgin is built on blackland prairie soil.

=== Climate ===
The climate in this area is characterized by hot, humid summers and generally mild to cool winters. According to the Köppen Climate Classification system, Elgin has a humid subtropical climate, Cfa on climate maps.

Climate data for Elgin, Texas (1 mile north) (1991–2020 normals, extremes 1963–2020)
Month	Jan	Feb	Mar	Apr	May	Jun	Jul	Aug	Sep	Oct	Nov	Dec	Year
Record high °F (°C)	89 (32)	98 (37)	96 (36)	100 (38)	100 (38)	107 (42)	107 (42)	108 (42)	110 (43)	97 (36)	91 (33)	86 (30)	110 (43)
Mean maximum °F (°C)	78.0 (25.6)	81.7 (27.6)	85.7 (29.8)	90.3 (32.4)	93.9 (34.4)	98.1 (36.7)	100.7 (38.2)	102.0 (38.9)	98.8 (37.1)	92.8 (33.8)	84.8 (29.3)	79.4 (26.3)	103.3 (39.6)
Mean daily maximum °F (°C)	60.8 (16.0)	64.3 (17.9)	71.3 (21.8)	78.5 (25.8)	85.2 (29.6)	91.8 (33.2)	95.0 (35.0)	96.2 (35.7)	90.0 (32.2)	81.3 (27.4)	70.1 (21.2)	62.2 (16.8)	78.9 (26.1)
Daily mean °F (°C)	50.0 (10.0)	53.5 (11.9)	60.3 (15.7)	67.6 (19.8)	75.0 (23.9)	81.5 (27.5)	84.1 (28.9)	84.6 (29.2)	78.9 (26.1)	69.9 (21.1)	59.4 (15.2)	51.7 (10.9)	68.0 (20.0)
Mean daily minimum °F (°C)	39.2 (4.0)	42.7 (5.9)	49.4 (9.7)	56.7 (13.7)	64.8 (18.2)	71.2 (21.8)	73.3 (22.9)	73.0 (22.8)	67.9 (19.9)	58.4 (14.7)	48.7 (9.3)	41.1 (5.1)	57.2 (14.0)
Mean minimum °F (°C)	23.9 (−4.5)	27.5 (−2.5)	31.6 (−0.2)	40.7 (4.8)	51.1 (10.6)	63.3 (17.4)	68.9 (20.5)	67.5 (19.7)	56.6 (13.7)	41.5 (5.3)	31.4 (−0.3)	26.4 (−3.1)	21.3 (−5.9)
Record low °F (°C)	7 (−14)	10 (−12)	17 (−8)	33 (1)	42 (6)	54 (12)	62 (17)	59 (15)	44 (7)	29 (−2)	21 (−6)	0 (−18)	0 (−18)
Average precipitation inches (mm)	2.96 (75)	2.06 (52)	3.15 (80)	2.73 (69)	4.86 (123)	2.98 (76)	1.97 (50)	2.32 (59)	2.97 (75)	4.02 (102)	3.07 (78)	3.00 (76)	36.09 (917)
Average snowfall inches (cm)	0.0 (0.0)	0.0 (0.0)	0.0 (0.0)	0.0 (0.0)	0.0 (0.0)	0.0 (0.0)	0.0 (0.0)	0.0 (0.0)	0.0 (0.0)	0.0 (0.0)	0.0 (0.0)	0.0 (0.0)	0.0 (0.0)
Average precipitation days (≥ 0.01 in)	5.7	5.8	6.8	5.2	6.0	5.9	4.4	3.8	5.5	5.8	4.8	5.7	65.4
Average snowy days (≥ 0.1 in)	0.1	0.0	0.0	0.0	0.0	0.0	0.0	0.0	0.0	0.0	0.0	0.0	0.0
Source: NOAA

== Demographics ==
Historical population
Census	Pop.	Note	%±
1910	1,707		—
1920	1,630		−4.5%
1930	1,823		11.8%
1940	2,008		10.1%
1950	3,168		57.8%
1960	3,511		10.8%
1970	3,832		9.1%
1980	4,535		18.3%
1990	4,846		6.9%
2000	5,700		17.6%
2010	8,135		42.7%
2020	9,784		20.3%
2025 (est.)	13,327		36.2%
U.S. Decennial Census

=== 2020 census ===
As of the 2020 census, Elgin had a population of 9,784, 3,258 households, and 2,158 families. The median age was 34.5 years, with 27.3% of residents under the age of 18 and 12.3% aged 65 or older. For every 100 females there were 93.3 males, and for every 100 females age 18 and over there were 90.9 males.

Of those households, 40.5% had children under the age of 18 living in them, 46.4% were married-couple households, 17.9% had a male householder with no spouse or partner present, and 28.4% had a female householder with no spouse or partner present. About 20.3% of all households were made up of individuals and 8.5% had someone living alone who was 65 years of age or older.

The census counted 3,462 housing units, of which 5.9% were vacant; the homeowner vacancy rate was 1.6% and the rental vacancy rate was 4.1%.

The 2020 census also reported that 94.6% of residents lived in urban areas while 5.4% lived in rural areas.

Racial composition as of the 2020 census
Race	Number	Percent
White	4,160	42.5%
Black or African American	1,626	16.6%
American Indian and Alaska Native	122	1.2%
Asian	51	0.5%
Native Hawaiian and Other Pacific Islander	4	0.0%
Some other race	2,021	20.7%
Two or more races	1,800	18.4%
Hispanic or Latino (of any race)	4,751	48.6%

=== 2010 census ===
As of the census of 2010, there were 8,135 people. The population density was 1,402.6 inhabitants per square mile (541.5/km^{2}). There were 2,948 housing units at an average density of 508.3 units per square mile (196.3 units/km^{2}). The racial makeup of the city was 57.14% White, 17.30% African American, 1.00% Native American, 0.49% Asian, 0.20% Pacific Islander, 20.12% from other races, and 3.75% from two or more races. Hispanic or Latino of any race were 45.67% of the population.

=== 2000 census ===
As of the census of 2000, there were 1,869 households, out of which 36.2% had children under the age of 18 living with them, 51.8% were married couples living together, 14.6% had a female householder with no husband present, and 27.8% were non-families. 22.3% of all households were made up of individuals, and 11.6% had someone living alone who was 65 years of age or older. The average household size was 2.98 and the average family size was 3.50.

In the city, the population was spread out, with 29.8% under the age of 18, 10.6% from 18 to 24, 28.4% from 25 to 44, 17.6% from 45 to 64, and 13.6% who were 65 years of age or older. The median age was 32 years. For every 100 females, there were 97.9 males. For every 100 females age 18 and over, there were 93.8 males.

The median income for a household in the city was $38,750, and the median income for a family was $48,125. Males had a median income of $31,368 versus $21,095 for females. The per capita income for the city was $16,698. About 10.4% of families and 16.1% of the population were below the poverty line, including 21.2% of those under age 18 and 21.7% of those age 65 or over.

== Arts and culture ==
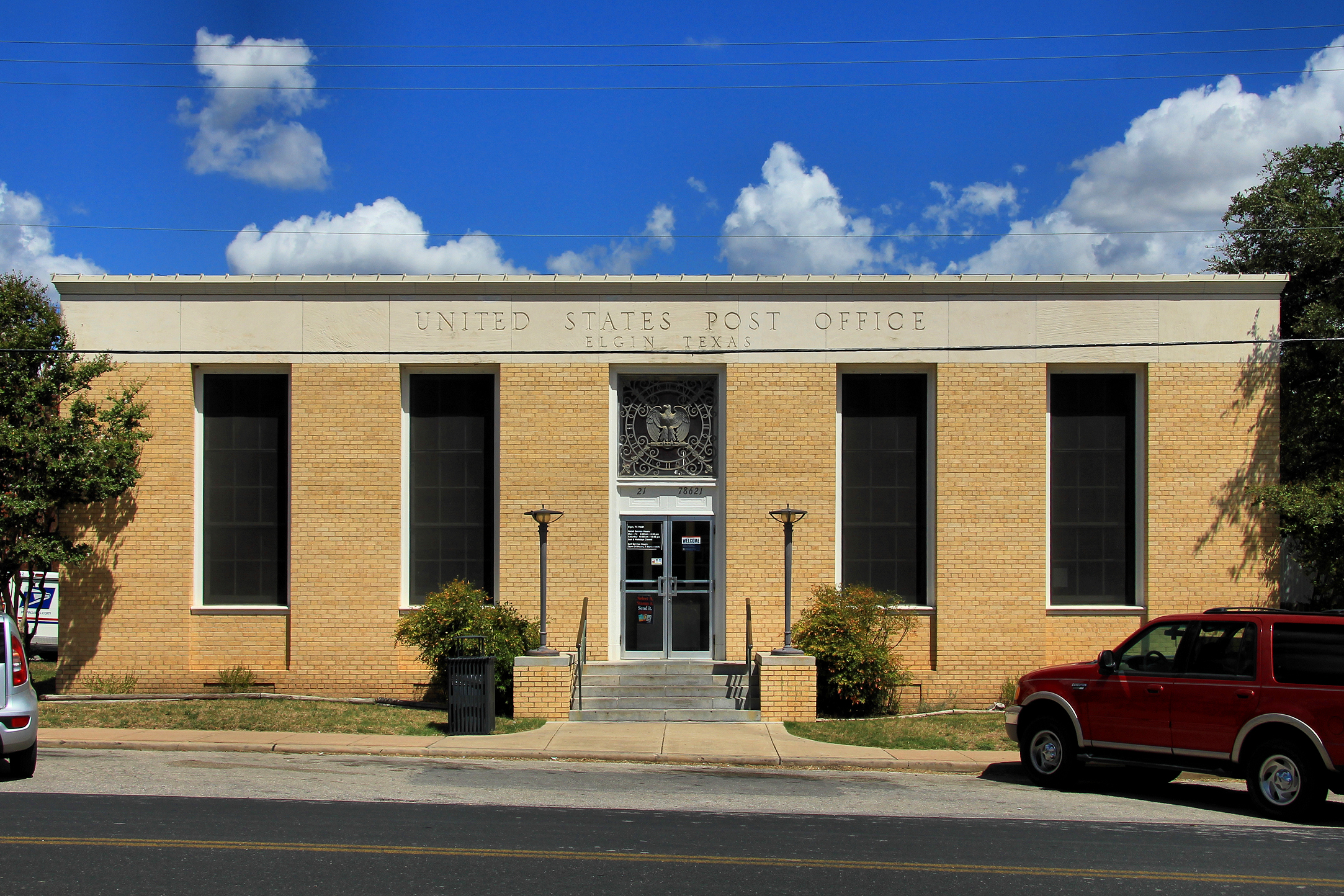
Elgin Post Office

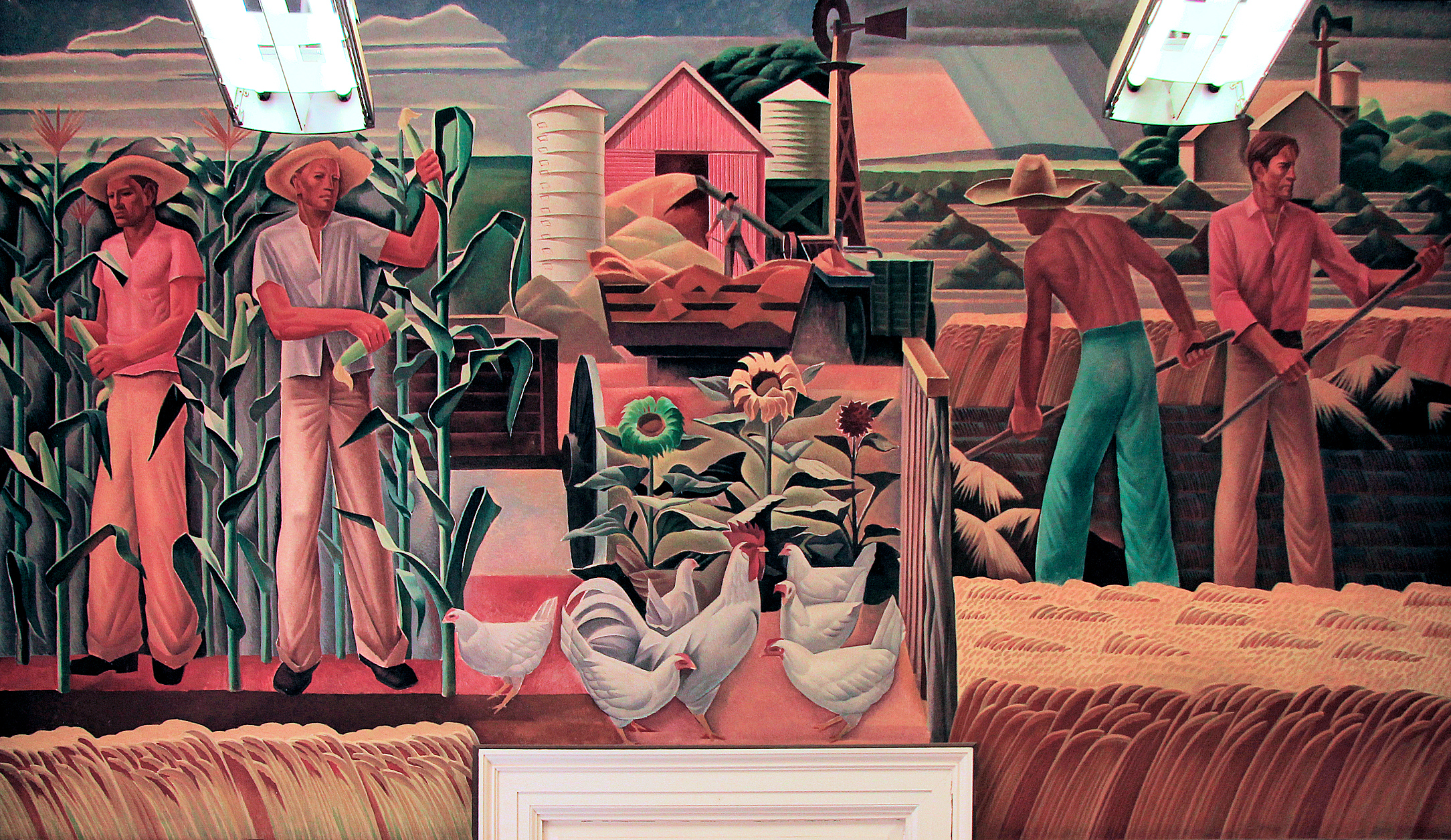
Texas Farm, the mural in the post office

The Chamber of Commerce is located in the original 1872 Houston and Texas Central Railroad building.

The mural Texas Farm, by Julius Woeltz, is located in the Elgin Post Office. Created as part of the 1930s Federal Arts Project, it depicts men harvesting vegetables and picking corn.

== Sports ==
In 2006, the Elgin Major Girls softball team finished third in the Softball World Series in Portland, Oregon. In 2007, the Elgin Little League's Major Girls' softball All-Stars finished in second place in the Little League World Series.

== Education ==
Elgin is served by the Elgin Independent School District, which covers more than 168 square miles (440 km^{2}) in portions of Bastrop, Lee, Williamson, and Travis Counties. It served approximately 4,000 students as of 2010.

A branch of Austin Community College opened in Elgin in 2013.

== Media ==
Radio station

- KTAE (AM)

Movies filmed in Elgin include:

- 1974 The Texas Chain Saw Massacre
- 1975 The Great Waldo Pepper
- 1982 The Best Little Whorehouse in Texas
- 1993 What's Eating Gilbert Grape
- 1993 A Perfect World
- 1995 The Big Green
- 1996 Michael
- 1999 Varsity Blues
- 2002 25th Hour
- 2002 The New Guy
- 2003 The Alamo
- 2006 A Scanner Darkly
- 2014 Transformers: Age of Extinction
- 2015 My All American
- 2018 Fear the Walking Dead
- 2019 Mercy Black

== Notable people ==
- Ray Culp, Major League Baseball All-Star pitcher
- Jake Helgren, film director, producer and screenwriter
- Chester Snowden, artist and illustrator
- Otho Davis, football trainer
- Erika Thompson, beekeeper
