= Otho Davis =

American football athletic trainer

Otho Leroy Davis

Personal information
- Born: February 8, 1934; Elgin, Texas, U.S.
- Died: May 2, 2000 (aged 66); Philadelphia, Pennsylvania, U.S.

Career information
- High school: South Park (Beaumont, Texas
- College: Lamar University; Kent State University

Career history
- Kent State University (1957-1965); Duke University (1965-1971); Baltimore Colts (1971–1972); Philadelphia Eagles (1973–1995)

Awards and highlights
- 5× NATA Pro Trainer of the year; Horrigan Award (1993)

Otho Leroy Davis was an American football athletic trainer. He was the award-winning head athletic trainer of the NFL's Philadelphia Eagles from 1973–95 and head athletic trainer for Kent State University from 1957-65.

== Early life ==
Otho Leroy Davis, a native of Elgin, Texas, was born on February 8, 1934, and attended South Park High in Beaumont, Texas, and later earned a B.S. degree in physical education from Lamar University in 1957 and an M.A. degree in 1964 from Kent State, where he was head athletic trainer from 1957-1965. Prior to that, he served in the U.S. Army Medical Service Corp from 1954-56 with the United States Command and General Staff College at Fort Leavenworth, Kansas, and was athletic trainer for the Beaumont (TX) "Exporter" baseball club in 1956. In 1965, he moved to Duke University for six seasons.

== Career ==
In 1971, Davis joined the Baltimore Colts for two seasons, his first foray in the NFL. Davis was hired by the Philadelphia Eagles in 1973. Davis served as head athletic trainer for the club until his retirement after the 1995 season. He was named Athletic Trainer of the Year five times (1977, 1978, 1980, 1981, 1987).

For 18 years (1971–1989), Davis served as the executive director of the National Athletic Trainers' Association (NATA). The NATA headquarters in Dallas, Texas was renamed in his honor. In 1981, Davis was inducted into the National Athletic Trainers' Hall of Fame. One of the highest honors for an athletic trainer to receive.

On May 1, 1993, Davis was also enshrined into the Pennsylvania Sports Hall of Fame - Philadelphia Chapter. In 1982, he received the Distinguished Service Award for Sports Medicine from the American Orthopedics Society for Sports Medicine. His other honors include having been inducted into the Southwest Athletic Trainers' Association (Texas and Arkansas) Hall of Fame in 1987 and being a member of "Who's Who in the East." He is also a member of the Kent State University Hall of Fame and an Honorary member of the Kent State Varsity "K". Davis also held memberships in various professional organizations, including the International Narcotic Enforcement Officers Association.

Davis was also nominated in April 1993 by the Professional Football Writers Association (PFWA) for the Horrigan Award. This honor is bestowed upon the league or club official or player for his qualities and professional style in helping pro football writers do his or her job.

Davis served as the charter president of the Pennsylvania Athletic Trainers' Society.

Davis was a member of the Board of Advisors of the Ed Block Courage Award which honors a player from all 32 NFL teams each season who, in the eyes of their teammates, best displays courage. Davis worked with Ed Block as an Associate Athletic Trainer during his tenure with the Baltimore Colts.

He also was a member of the Board of Governors of the Maxwell Football Club and was a past member of the executive committee of the Professional Football Athletic Trainers' Society.

In 1999, John Madden named Davis to his All Madden Team as the all time athletic trainer. The same year he was named to the Eagles Honor Roll, now known as the Philadelphia Eagles Hall of Fame.

== Personal life ==
He is the father of four sons: Mark, Harry, Richard, and Tom. He lived in Mount Laurel, NJ for a period of time.

== Death ==
On May 2, 2000, Davis died after a long battle with pancreatic cancer.

== Legacy ==
In 2009, Otho Davis was nominated as the first athletic trainer for induction into the Pro Football Hall of Fame. He finished 6th in the fans voting at Fans Choice in his first year of eligibility.
