= Professional Staff Congress =

Trade union for New York City university staff

- Predecessor: UFCT, LCCU
- Founded: April 14, 1972
- Members: 20,000
- Affiliations: AFT, NYSUT
- Website: www.psc-cuny.org

The Professional Staff Congress or PSC CUNY is a trade union that represents faculty and professional staff of the City University of New York campuses. As of 2018, the PSC represented 30,000 faculty and staff members at CUNY.

== History ==
PSC was co-founded by Israel Kugler and Belle Zeller on April 14, 1972, as a merger between United Federation of College Teachers and its rival the Legislative Conference of the City University. Zeller served as president, and Kugler as deputy president of the PSC after its formation. CUNY challenged the right of the PSC to represent its faculty, forcing the PSC into a second election. The PSC won this second election on June 7, 1972. After a year of negotiations and a threatened strike, CUNY consented to a three-year collective bargaining agreement.

== Affiliations ==
It is affiliated with the American Federation of Teachers (Local No. 2334) and the Central Labor Council. It is also a member of the American Association of University Professors and New York State United Teachers.
