= Alfred Zeller =

American painter

- Born: June 14, 1909; Hamburg, Germany
- Died: June 4, 1988 (aged 79); Houston, Texas
- Known for: Painting

Alfred Zeller (June 14, 1909 – June 4, 1988) was an American illustrator and painter born in Germany.

== Biography ==
Zeller was the son of Henry John Zeller and Theresa Krewet, born in Hamburg, Germany. In 1938, Alfred Zeller emigrated from Germany to Ecuador, and later to Houston, Texas. Zeller married Evelyn Josephine Monford of Galveston, Texas. In September 1944, they had a son, Gary Allen Zeller, in Houston, Texas.

Alfred Zeller's first accepted drawing was a caricature for The Times-Picayune, a New Orleans newspaper. He then drew a series of cartoon postal cards for a novelty store. When possible, Zeller spent his evenings illustrating ideas.

Zeller was the illustrator for publications by Royal Dixon, the naturalist author. Later, Zeller began painting more seriously with oils. Zeller's themes included China, the Middle East, winter scenes, still life, country scenes, portraits and abstract works including Cubism.

His work was exhibited at the Lantern Lane Gallery and in numerous juried shows in the Houston area. Zeller was awarded the Purchase Prize at Weimar, Texas in 1968 and juried Houston area art shows.

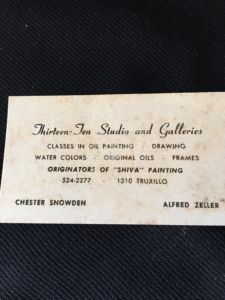
Thirteen Ten Art Studio and Galleries

Since 1964, Alfred Zeller and Chester Snowden worked together in their Thirteen Ten Art Studio and Galleries, located at 1310 Truxillo Street in Houston, Texas. They offered classes in oil painting and claimed to be the "originators of the Shiva painting technique". Alfred Zeller died in Houston, Texas at the age of 79.
