= Chester Snowden =

American painter (1900–1984)

Chester Dixon Snowden
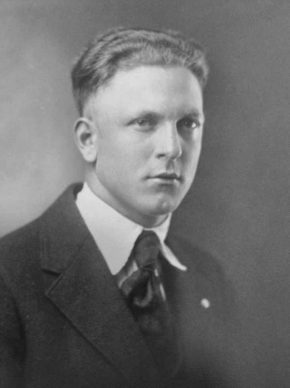
- Born: Chester Genora Snowden; Elgin, Texas
- Died: Houston, Texas
- Education: University of Texas at Austin, Cooper Union
- Known for: Painting, Illustration

Chester Dixon Snowden (1900–1984), was born Chester Genora Snowden in Elgin, Texas. Snowden was the son of James Albert Snowden and Amelia Pearl Frazier. He graduated from the University of Texas at Austin and attended the Cooper Union in New York as well as studying at the Art Students League of New York, Grand Central Galleries Art School (New York) and the Richard Art School in Los Angeles. His teachers included Harry Sternberg, Boardman Robinson and Walter Jack Duncan.

Snowden worked as a painter, illustrator, educator, and playwright. For decades, Snowden provided art for the publications of naturalist author Royal Dixon. Snowden and Dixon were life partners and since 1934, lived together at "Camellia Place", located at 1310 Truxillo Street in Houston, Texas. Snowden adopted the professional name, Chester Dixon Snowden, based on his relationship with Dixon.

As an illustrator, his social circles overlapped with the literary personalities of his time. In 1934, he co-wrote with Margo Jones the Texas Centennial play "Pioneer Texas". Works illustrated by Snowden include "Shafts of Gold" (1938), "Children of Hawaii" (1939), "Ape of Heaven", "Half Dark Moon" and "Wildwood Friends." By 1946, Snowden had illustrated twenty-two books. Snowden reported in Houston's Mirror in 1968 that he had counted among his friends and acquaintances Robert Frost, Edna St. Vincent Millay and George Bernard Shaw.

His works included pen and ink drawings and many experiments in different mediums and was inspired by the works of Matisse and Picasso. Snowden was always encouraging his students to try new media and new ideas in art. A group exhibition of works by former students of the Museum School, Museum of Fine Arts, Houston organized by Robert Preusser was shown in 1951. It Included work by Snowden, Lowell Collins, Frank Freed, Gertrude Levy, Leila McConnell, Stella Sullivan and George Shackelford.

Since 1964, Chester Snowden and Alfred Zeller worked together in their Thirteen Ten Art Studio & Galleries, located at 1310 Truxillo Street in Houston, Texas. They offered classes in oil painting and other mediums as well as framing.

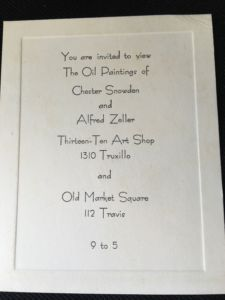
Snowden and Zeller exhibition

Snowden exhibited regularly in Texas from the mid-1930s through 1960. His works have been exhibited at various galleries and museums including The Corcoran Gallery of Art, The Contemporary Arts Museum and the Museum of Fine Arts, Houston. Snowden died in 1984 and the location of his grave is unknown.

== Selected exhibitions ==
1935 11th Annual Exhibition of Work by Houston Artists, Museum of Fine Arts Houston, Texas (honorable mention)

1936–37 12th–13th Annual Exhibition of Work by Houston Artists, Museum of Fine Arts Houston, Texas

1937–39 Works by Southeast Texas Artists 1st-3rd Annual Exhibition, Museum of Fine Arts, Houston, Texas

1939, 1941 Biennial, Corcoran Gallery of Art, Washington, DC

1939–40 15th–16th Annual Exhibition of Work by Houston Artists, Museum of Fine Arts Houston, Texas

1941 2nd Texas-Oklahoma General Exhibition, circulated: Dallas Museum of Art, Dallas; Museum of Fine Arts, Houston; Witte Museum, San Antonio; Philbrook Art Museum, Tulsa, Oklahoma

1942–43 17th–18th Annual Exhibition of Work by Houston Artists, Museum of Fine Arts Houston, Texas

1943 5th Texas General Exhibition 1943–1944, circulated: Museum of Fine Arts, Houston; Witte Museum, San Antonio; Dallas Museum of Art, Dallas, Texas

1945 20th Annual Exhibition of Work by Houston Artists, Museum of Fine Arts Houston, Texas

1945 7th Texas General Exhibition 1945–1946, circulated: Witte Museum, San Antonio; Dallas Museum of Art, Dallas; Museum of Fine Arts, Houston; University of Texas at Austin, Texas

1946 21st Annual Exhibition of Work by Houston Artists, Museum of Fine Arts Houston, Texas (purchase prize)

1946 Annual Texas Artists Circuit Exhibition, traveled by Texas Fine Arts Association, Austin, Texas

1947 22nd Annual Exhibition of Work by Houston Artists, Museum of Fine Arts Houston, Texas

1947 9th Texas General Exhibition 1947–1948, circulated: Museum of Fine Arts, Houston; Dallas Museum of Art, Dallas; Witte Museum, San Antonio, Texas

1948 23rd Annual Exhibition of Work by Houston Artists, Museum of Fine Arts Houston, Texas

1948 10th Texas General Exhibition 1948–1949, circulated: Witte Museum, San Antonio; Museum of Fine Arts, Houston; Dallas Museum of Art, Dallas, Texas

1949–50 24th–25th Annual Exhibition of Work by Houston Artists, Museum of Fine Arts Houston, Texas

1951 Houston Post Easter Art Contest, Museum of Fine Arts Houston, Texas

1951 26th Annual Exhibition of Work by Houston Artists, Museum of Fine Arts Houston, Texas (cash prize)

1951 13th Annual Exhibition of Texas Painting and Sculpture 1951–1952, circulated: Museum of Fine Arts, Houston; Dallas Museum of Art, Dallas; Witte Museum, San Antonio, Texas

1952 Annual Texas Artists Circuit Exhibition, traveled by Texas Fine Arts Association, Austin, Texas

1952 27th Annual Exhibition of Work by Houston Artists, Museum of Fine Arts Houston, Texas (honorable mention)

1952 14th Annual Exhibition of Texas Painting and Sculpture 1952, circulated: Dallas Museum of Art, Dallas, Witte Museum, San Antonio; Museum of Fine Arts, Houston, Texas

1952 Solo, Junior League of Houston, Texas

1953–54 28th–29th Annual Exhibition of Work by Houston Artists, Museum of Fine Arts Houston, Texas (materials prize 1954)

1955 30th-31st Annual Exhibition of Houston Artists, Dallas Museum of Art, Dallas, Texas (cash prize March 1955)

1956–57 Texas Fine Arts Association Exhibition, Laguna Gloria Museum, Austin, Texas

1956 D. D. Feldman Collection of Contemporary Texas Art, Museum of Fine Arts, Houston, Texas

1956 Gulf-Caribbean Art Exhibition, Museum of Fine Arts, Houston, traveled to: Dallas Museum of Fine Arts, Dallas; Institute of Contemporary Art, Boston; Munson-Williams-Proctor Institute, Utica; Carnegie Institute, Pittsburg; Colorado Springs Fine Art Center, Colorado Springs, Colorado (catalogue)

1957 7th Annual Houston Post Easter Art Exhibit, Houston Art League Building, Houston, Texas

1957–60 32nd–35th Annual Houston Artists Exhibition, Museum of Fine Arts Houston, Texas

1960 22nd Annual Texas Painting and Sculpture Exhibition 1960–1961, circulated: Dallas Museum of Art, Dallas; Witte Museum, San Antonio; Beaumont Art Museum, Beaumont; Museum of Fine Arts, Houston, Texas

2006 Houston Art in Houston Collections: Works from 1900 to 1965, Heritage Society Museum, Houston, Texas

2008 Founders of Houston Art: Thirty Artists Who Led the Way, William Reaves Fine Art, Houston, Texas

2009–10 Texas Art Seen, Grace Museum, Abilene, Texas

2011 Lone Star Modernism: A Celebration of Mid-Century Texas Art, William Reaves Fine Art, Houston, Texas

2011 Southeast Texas Art: Cross-Currents and Influences, 1925–1965, Art Museum of Southeast Texas, Beaumont, Texas

2012 A Survey of Texas Modernists, William Reaves Fine Art, Houston, Texas

2013 Summer Encore Exhibition, William Reaves Fine Art, Houston, Texas

2014 Houston Founders at City Hall Art Exhibition, City Hall, Houston, Texas

2014 A New Visual Vocabulary: Developments in Texas Modernism 1935–1965, One Allen Center, Lobby Gallery, Houston, Texas

2015 Bayou City Chic: Progressive Streams of Modern Art in Houston, Art Museum of South Texas, Corpus Christi, Texas (catalogue)
