= Indiana State Sycamores football =

Football program representing Indiana State University

2026 Indiana State Sycamores football team
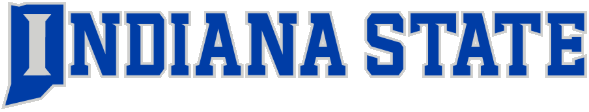
- First season: 1896; 130 years ago
- Athletic director: Nathan Christensen
- Head coach: Curt Mallory; 9th season, 28–66 (.298)
- Location: Terre Haute, Indiana
- Stadium: Memorial Stadium (capacity: 12,764)
- NCAA division: Division I FCS
- Conference: Missouri Valley
- Colors: Royal blue and white
- All-time record: 413–583–23 (.417)
- Bowl record: 0–1 (.000)

Conference championships
- ICC: 1964
- Consensus All-Americans: 16
- Rivalries: Ball State (rivalry); Illinois State
- Fight song: March On!
- Mascot: Sycamore Sam
- Marching band: Marching Sycamores
- Outfitter: Under Armour
- Website: GoSycamores.com

The Indiana State Sycamores football team is the NCAA Division I football program of Indiana State University in Terre Haute, Indiana. They compete in the Missouri Valley Football Conference. The team last played in the NCAA Playoffs in the 2014 NCAA Division I Football Championship. While their first season was 1896, most of the records from 1896 to 1899 have been lost over time. In addition, the university did not field a football team on a consistent basis until 1923. The Sycamores' greatest season was 1983, when coach Dennis Raetz led them to the 2nd round of the 1983 NCAA Division I Football Championship and ended the season with a record of 9–4 and #5 ranking. The Sycamores also appeared in the 1984 and 2014 NCAA Division I Football Championship playoffs. Raetz is the winningest Head Coach in Indiana State football history (94–105–1) over 18 seasons. Jerry Huntsman (43–24–1 .640) has the highest winning percentage of all Sycamore Head Coaches and Tom Harp led the Sycamores thru the transition from a Division II independent program to Division I status with the Missouri Valley Conference. Harp's stepson, Cam Cameron, would also gain renown as a college and NFL coach in his own right.

The Sycamore sidelines have been the foundation for several NFL Head Coaches and long-time Assistant Coaches; notable coaching alumni include: Super Bowl Champion Head Coach Sean Payton (1990–1991); 2-time Super Bowl Champion Assistant Coach Bobby Turner (1975–1982) who is also a 1972 graduate of Indiana State; Super Bowl Champion Assistant Coach Kirk Olivadotti (1998–1999); Super Bowl Champion Assistant Coach Chris Wilson (1993–1994, 1997); Alvin Reynolds (1982–1992), Class of 1982); Pete Hoener (1978–1984); Dick Jamieson (1978–79); David Hutchison (2002–2006); graduate assistant Stan Schwartz would win 4 Grey Cups with the Calgary Stampeders. The new Baltimore Ravens Head Coach Jesse Minter spent 4 seasons (2009–2012) on the Sycamore sideline before following Trent Miles to Georgia State.

The Indiana State Sycamores play their home games at Memorial Stadium, which seats 12,764.

== History ==
=== Classifications ===
- 1896–1951: NCAA open classification
- 1952–1964: NCAA / NAIA (dual membership)
- 1965–1972: NCAA College Division
- 1970–1973: NAIA Division I
- 1973–1975: NCAA Division II
- 1976–1977: NCAA Division I
- 1978–1981: NCAA Division I–A
- 1982–present: NCAA Division I–AA/FCS

=== Conference membership ===
- 1896–1933: Independent
- 1934–1949: Indiana Intercollegiate Conference
- 1950–1967: Indiana Collegiate Conference
- 1968–1972: Independent
- 1973–1975: Division II Independent
- 1976–1977: Missouri Valley Conference (Division I)
- 1978–1981: Missouri Valley Conference (Division I-A)
- 1982–1985: Missouri Valley Conference (Division I-AA)
- 1986–present: Gateway Football Conference / Missouri Valley Football Conference

== Conference championships ==
Years	Conference	Overall Record	Conference Record
1964	Indiana Collegiate Conference	6–2	4–2

The 1964 Indiana State Sycamores football team shared the Indiana Collegiate Conference (ICC) title in 1964 with four other teams (Ball State, Butler, Evansville, Valparaiso, with the Sycamores finishing with a 4–2 conference record and a 6–2 overall mark.

== Bowls and playoffs ==
=== Bowl games ===
The Sycamores have participated in one bowl game, garnering a record of 0–1.

Year	Bowl	Opponent	Result
1949	Shrine Bowl	Southern Illinois	L 14–41

=== Division I NCAA Playoffs ===
The Sycamores have appeared in the NCAA Division I Football Championship three times. Their combined record is 2–3.

Year	Round	Opponent	Result
1983	NCAA Division I First Round; Quarterfinals	Eastern Illinois; Southern Illinois	W 16–13 (2OT); L 7–23
1984	Pecan Bowl	Middle Tennessee State	L 41–42 (3OT)
2014	NCAA Division I First Round; NCAA Division I Second Round	Eastern Kentucky; Chattanooga	W 36–16; L 14–35

=== Rankings ===
The Sycamores reached the AP and United Press International Top Ten mid-way through the 1974 season; they would not return to the Top Ten until the 1983 season when they finished #5; they finished the 1984 season ranked #5 as well after spending six weeks ranked #1 in the Polls. The Sycamores were ranked for nine weeks of the 2014 season and an additional four weeks during the 2015 season. The 2018 Sycamores finished #25 in the final FCS coaches poll.

== Head coaches ==
All Indiana State Coaching Records are available at:

Coach (Alma Mater)	Seasons	Tenure	Games	Record	Pct.
Dennis Raetz (Nebraska, 1968)	18	1980–1997	200	94–105–1	.473
Wally Marks (Chicago, 1927)	16	1927–1930, 1933–1941, 1946–1948	125	62–56–7	.524
Jerry Huntsman (Wabash, 1952)	7	1966–1972	68	43–24–1	.640
Bill Jones (Ohio Wesleyan, 1939)	9	1957–1965	70	32–37–1	.464
Curt Mallory (Michigan, 1990)	9	2017–present	94	29-66	.298
Tim McGuire (Nebraska, 1975)	7	1998–2004	79	24–55	.304
Art Strum (Wisconsin-LaCrosse, 1916)	6	1923–1926, 1932, 1942	43	21–20–2	.512
Tom Harp (Muskingum, 1951)	5	1973–1977	51	20–31	.392
Trent Miles (Indiana State, 1987)	5	2008–2012	56	20–36	.357
Mike Sanford (Southern California, 1976)	4	2013–2016	48	18–30	.375
Mark Dean (Northern Illinois, 1938)	5	1951–1954, 1956	39	15–20–4	.436
Dick Jamieson (Bradley, 1961)	2	1978–1979	22	11–11	.500
Phil Brown (Butler, 1923)	1	1944	8	5–2–1	.688
J. Roy Goodlad (Wisconsin, 1929)	1	1931	7	4–3	.571
CPO Bob LeCray (Note: Chief Petty Officer (CPO) LeCroy was member of US Navy's V-12 program staff during World War II) (SE Okla St, 19--)	1	1945	6	2–4	.333
Paul Selge (Indiana State, 1943)	1	1955	9	2–7	.222
George Ashworth (Indiana State, 1935)	2	1949–1950	19	2–16–1	.132
Lou West (Cincinnati, 1976)	3	2005–2007	33	1–32	.030
various (7 others)	13	1896–1909, 1920–1922, 1943	42	9–28–5	.274
PROGRAM TOTALS	116-yrs	1896-Pres.	1,019	414-583-23	.418

== Rivalries ==
=== Ball State ===
From 1924 to 2023, the Sycamores played Ball State (Ind.) University 66 times; the series stands at 39–24–1 in favor of Ball State.

In 1940, the respective Blue Key chapters sponsored a trophy presentation, the 'Victory Bell' to reward the winner of the annual game between Indiana State and Ball State. The Sycamores lost the last game in Muncie. The game finished with a 45–7 loss for the Sycamores

== Traditions ==
=== Homecoming ===
The term Homecoming was first used in print announcements for the Alumni-Varsity Basketball Game on December 9, 1916. By the year 1919, this event became known as Blue and White Day and featured dances and entertainment for alumni of the Normal School. In 1921 the events were organized around a football game scheduled earlier in the autumn. A bonfire and pep rally were added to the festivities in 1922; the Blue-and-White Parade in 1923; and in 1937, Bette Whitmore (Kappa Kappa) was elected ISUs first Homecoming Queen. The 2010 season will mark the 106th season of Sycamore football and the 91st Homecoming; the Sycamores will face conference foe, Illinois State, on October 9. This will mark the 7th time that Illinois State has been the Homecoming opponent; following a tremendous victory (59–24) the Sycamores now own a 5–2 mark vs. Illinois State in Homecoming games.

As of 2012; Indiana State owns a 50–36–2 (.580) record in Homecoming games; the outcomes of the remaining 5 games are unknown.

=== Victory Bell ===
A symbol of the traditional rivalry in football between Indiana State and Ball State, the Victory Bell tradition was inaugurated in 1940 when the Blue Key chapters at both schools arranged to donate a bell to be presented to the victor of the football game. The idea was to start a traditional exchange of the bell as a means of improving relationships between the two student bodies. The Victory Bell series is 34–19–1 in favor of Ball State, though the Sycamores won their last meeting in 2014.

== Stadiums ==
Year	Home
1896–1948	Multiple Venues; including Thompson Park, aka, Parsons Field.
1949–present	Memorial Stadium, constructed in 1924.

The Sycamores have played football at venerable Memorial Stadium since the 1949 campaign. Originally constructed in 1922–24, at a cost of $450,000; the 12,764-seat stadium remains a fixture at the intersection of Wabash and Brown Avenues in Terre Haute, IN.

Memorial Stadium's inauguration was on May 5, 1925, as the local minor league baseball team, the Terre Haute Tots, hosted their Three-I League rivals, the Peoria Tractors, before an estimated crowd of 9,000. Among the esteemed visitors were Major League Baseball Commissioner Judge Kenesaw Mountain Landis and Charles Barnard of the Cleveland Indians.

The facility was acquired (via a 99-year lease) by Indiana State University in 1967. The installation of Astroturf made Indiana State the first university to own a football stadium with artificial turf.

== Player of the year ==
=== National ===
- Shakir Bell – 2011 Walter Payton Award Finalist (Top 2 vote receiver)
- Johnny Towalid – 2012 Co-National FCS Defensive Back of the Year (by College Football Performance)

=== Conference ===
- Edgar Freese – 1965 Indiana Collegiate Conference DT (Lineman)
- Reggie Allen – 1979 Missouri Valley Conference QB (offense)
- Gerry Gluscic – 1979 Missouri Valley Conference DE (defense)
- Craig Shaffer – 1981 Missouri Valley Conference LB (defense)
- Jeff Miller – 1984 Missouri Valley Conference QB (offense)
- Wayne Davis – 1984 Missouri Valley Conference DB (defense)
- Jeff Miller – 1985 Missouri Valley Conference QB (offense)
- Vencie Glenn – 1985 Missouri Valley Conference DB (defense)
- Derrick Franklin – 1991 Missouri Valley Football Conference RB (offense)
- Julian Reese - 2001 Missouri Valley Football Conference QB (Newcomer of the Year)
- Shakir Bell – 2011 Missouri Valley Football Conference RB (offense)
- Ryan Boyle - 2018 Missouri Valley Football Conference QB (Newcomer of the Year)
- Cade Chambers - 2022 Missouri Valley Football Conference QB (Freshman of the Year)

== Retired numbers ==
One Sycamore player has had his number retired by the school. Vincent Allen is the first, with his number 26 retired by the school on September 6, 2025.

Indiana State Sycamores retired numbers
No.	Player	Pos.	Tenure	No. ret.	Ref.
26	Vincent Allen	Halfback	1973–77	2025	

== First-team All-Americans ==
- Jeff Keller, DE – 1967 American Football Coaches Association
- Chris Hicks, OT – 1975 American Football Coaches Association
- Vincent Allen, RB – 1976 American Football Coaches Association
- Ed Martin, DE – 1983 American Football Coaches Association
- Wayne Davis, DB – 1984 American Football Coaches Association
- Vencie Glenn, DB – 1985 American Football Coaches Association
- Steve Mckeel DB – 1986 Associated Press
- Mike Simmonds, OT – 1986 American Football Coaches Association
- Steve McKeel DB – 1987 Associated Press
- Derrick Franklin, RB – 1991 Walter Camp, The Sports Network
- Shawn Moore, OG – 1993 American Football Coaches Association
- Dan Brandenburg, DT – 1994 American Football Coaches Association
- Dan Brandenburg, DT – 1995 The Sports Network, American Football Quarterly
- Tom Allison, PK – 1995 Don Hansen's Football Gazette
- Troy Lefevra, DE – 1998 Don Hansen's Football Gazette
- DeJuan Alfonzo, DB/RS – 1999 American Football Coaches Association
- Shakir Bell, RB – 2011 Associated Press, American Football Coaches Association, The Sports Network
- Ben Obaseki, DL – 2011 Associated Press
- Joshua Appel, LS – 2015 STATS All-American
- Elijah Owns, QB – 2024 Phil Steele All-American

== Academic All-American ==
- Gary Brown, E – 1971
- Michael Eads, E – 1972
- Mark Maley E −1973
- Daniel Millington, DE – 2009
- Alex Sewall, DB – 2011

=== NCAA Post-Graduate Scholarship ===
- Jeffrey Miller, QB – 1986

== All-Conference ==
=== All-Indiana Collegiate Conference ===
- Bob Masulovich, OL, 1952
- Jack Griffith, OL, 1953
- Bob Masulovich, OL, 1953
- Jack Griffith, End, 1954
- Bob Masulovich, OL, 1954
- Bill Griffith, End, 1955
- Wally Geib, OL, 1962
- Joe Beach, DL, 1962
- Wally Geib, OL, 1963
- John Allen, OL, 1964

- Rolland Beckham, OL, 1964
- Arthur Fallon, OT, 1964
- Willie Smith, End, 1964
- Emmitt "Tank" Tyler, FB, 1964
- Edgar Freese, OL, 1965
- Bernard Heins, OL, 1965
- John Newbitt, HB, 1965
- Bob Pychinka, LB, 1965
- John Truitt, End, 1965
- John Truitt, End, 1966

- Joe Fiedler, C, 1966
- Randy Payne, HB, 1966
- Bob Pychinka, LB, 1966
- Timon Kendall, OL, 1967
- Rich Attonito, DB, 1967
- Stan Worrall, DL, 1967

=== All-Missouri Valley Conference ===
- Vincent Allen, RB, 1977
- Don Jackson, DB, 1977
- Gary Gamen, DT, 1978
- John Allman, DB, 1978
- Kirk Wilson, WR, 1979
- Eddie Ruffin, WR, 1979
- George DeTella, OT, 1979
- Reggie Allen, QB, 1979
- Gerry Gluscic, DE, 1979
- John Allman, DB, 1979
- Hubert Moore, TE, 1980

- Eddie Ruffin, WR, 1980
- Mark Gradkowski, OG, 1980
- John Gaunt, DT, 1980
- Craig Shaffer, LB, 1980
- John Allman, DB, 1980
- Hubert Moore, TE 1981
- Kirk Wilson, WR, 1981
- Craig Shaffer, LB, 1981
- Walter Seaphus, NG, 1982
- Ed Martin, DE, 1982

- Dan Maher, LB, 1982
- Bob Koehne, OT, 1983
- Rich Dawson, C, 1983
- Jeff Miller, QB, 1983
- Ed Martin, DE, 1983
- Quintin Mikell, LB, 1983
- Kevin Ramsey, DB, 1983
- Wayne Davis, DB, 1984
- Steve Buxton, OG, 1984
- Rich Dawson, C, 1984

- Jeff Miller, QB, 1984
- Darrold Clardy, RB, 1984
- Scott Bridges, PK, 1984
- Doug Arnold, NG, 1984
- Brad Verdun, DT, 1984
- Jeff Miller, QB, 1985
- Doug Arnold, NG, 1985
- Terry Bell, WR, 1985
- Vencie Glenn, DB, 1985
- Mike Simmonds, OG, 1985
- Kurt Bell, DE, 1985

=== All-Missouri Valley Football Conference ===
- Mike Simmonds, OT, 1986
- Steve McKeel, DB, 1986
- Troy Johnson, LB, 1986
- Tim Cunningham, LB, 1986
- Chuck Standiford, P, 1986
- Pete Endre, OT, 1987
- Steve McKeel, DB, 1987
- Gary Cannon, WR, 1987
- Steve Elmlinger, WR, 1988
- Tori Vactor, RB, 1988
- Ken Hopp, LB, 1988
- Troy Mickens, DB, 1988
- Rodney Porter, TE, 1989
- Mark Bertram, DT, 1989
- Derrick Franklin, RB, 1990
- Charles Swann, WR, 1990
- Eric Christensen, LB, 1991
- Derrick Franklin, RB, 1991
- Charles Swann, WR, 1991
- Dyrrah Christon, NG, 1992

- David Wright, RB, 1992
- Dan Brandenburg, DT, 1993
- Von Ganaway, FS, 1993
- Tim Giebels, OT, 1993
- Shawn Moore, OG, 1993
- David Wright, RB, 1993
- Dan Brandenburg, DT, 1994
- Dustin Rusch, DT, 1994
- Dan Brandenburg, DT, 1995
- Dre Knox, DB, 1996
- Richard Moss, LB, 1996
- Robert High, FS, 1997
- Shannon Jackson, DT, 1997
- DeJuan Alfonzo, DB, 1998
- Troy Lefevra, DE, 1998
- DeJuan Alfonzo, DB, 1999
- Nathan Al-Ghetta, FB, 1999
- Shannon Jackson, DE, 1999
- Troy Lefevra, DE, 1999
- Richard Harris, DE, 2001

- Richard Harris, DE, 2002
- Dietrich Lapsley, LB, 2002
- Soso Dede, KR, 2002
- Ryan King, TE, 2003
- Kyle Mitchell, DE, 2003
- Kyle Mitchell, DE, 2004
- Sam Logan, WR, 2005
- Kyle Mitchell, DE, 2005
- Jamie Petrowski, TE, 2005
- Shonda Faulkner, LB, 2007
- Darrius Gates, RB, 2010
- Brock Lough, FB, 2010
- Ben Obaseki, DE, 2010
- Alex Sewall, DB, 2010
- Aaron Archie, LB, 2011
- Shakir Bell, RB, 2011
- Alex Jones, TE, 2011
- Brock Lough, FB, 2011
- FN Lutz, OL, 2011
- Ben Obaseki, DE, 2011

- Alex Sewall, DB, 2011
- Shakir Bell, RB, 2012
- Aaron Archie, LB, 2012
- Ben Obaseski, DE, 2012
- Johnny Towalid, DB, 2012
- Lucas Hileman, P, 2012
- Connor Underwood, DL, 2013
- Connor Underwood, DL, 2014
- Josh Appel, LS, 2015
- Josh Appel, LS, 2016
- Ja'Quan Keys, RB, 2018
- Jonas Griffith, LB, 2018

== Career leaders ==
=== Passing ===
Player	Years	Comp	Att	TD	Yds	Pct.	Int
Mike Perish	2012–2014	**618**	**1,050**	**45**	**6,696**	.590	28
Jeff Miller	1982–1985	555	1,016	40	6,448	.552	33
John Sahm	1986–1989	341	668	30	5,139	.496	38
Reggie Allen	1978–1981	367	782	29	5,094	.469	**46**
Ronnie Fouch	2010–2011	322	544	38	4,316	**.592**	15
Kip Hennelly	1991–1993	249	490	19	3,158	.508	27
Julian Reese	2001–2002	267	499	20	2,961	.535	21
Kevin Cox	1993–1996	238	528	20	2,885	.45	22
Kyle Frondorf	1986–1988	208	391	8	2,778	.532	24
Blayne Baggett	2005	284	473	15	2,741	.600	13

=== Rushing ===
Player	Years	Att	Yds	Avg.	TD
Vincent Allen	1973–1977	**832**	**4,335**	5.21	**31**
Shakir Bell	2010–2013	672	4,214	**6.3**	28
David Wright	1992–1995	784	4,181	5.33	22
Derrick Franklin	1989–1991	710	3,231	4.55	23
Eric Robinson	1979–1982	443	2,169	4.90	22
Jake Shields	2001–2004	521	2,119	4.07	19
Darrius Gates	2006–2010	396	2,010	5.08	20
Jim Brumfield	1967–1969	448	1,998	4.46	23
Darrold Clardy	1981–1984	355	1,594	4.49	19
Tori Vactor	1987–1988	312	1,545	4.95	12

=== Receiving ===
Player	Years	Rcpt	Yds	Avg.	TD
Dante Hendrix	2018-2022	190	**2,500**	13.2	13
Sam Logan	2003–2006	**196**	2,385	12.2	9
**Robert Tonyan**	2013–2016	147	2,029	13.8	**20**
Carl Berman	2003–2006	136	1,666	12.1	11
Rodney Porter	1986–1989	135	1,906	14.1	9
Terry Bell	1982–1985	132	2,048	15.5	13
Joe Downing	1982–1985	115	1,608	14.0	15
Eddie Ruffin	1978–1981	110	1,831	16.6	11
Gary Owens	2013–2015	105	1,373	13.1	13
Larry Brown	1993–1996	105	1,197	11.4	6
Steve Elminger	1987–1989	102	1,823	**17.9**	10
Steve Schmid	1967–1969	100	1,394	13.9	11

=== Scoring ===
Player	Years	TD	FG	PAT1	PAT2	PTS
Kyle Hooper	2003–2007	0	**42**	85	0	**221**
Vincent Allen	1973–1977	**33**	0	0	1	200
Tom Allison	1992–1995	0	38	82	0	196
Scott Bridges	1983–1985	0	31	**87**	0	180
Shakir Bell	2010–2013	30	0	0	0	180
Eric Heidorn	2013-2015	0	29	81	0	168
Mike Megyesi	1999–2002	0	27	83	0	164
Jim Brumfield	1967–1969	26	0	0	0	156
Robert Tonyan	2013–2016	22	0	0	4	140
David Wright	1992–1995	23	0	0	1	140

Career leaders in bold

== Coach of the Year ==
=== National (1) ===
- Curt Mallory – 2019 Phil Steele FCS Coach of the Year

=== District / Region (5) ===
- Jerry Huntsman – 1966 NCAA District #1
- Jerry Huntsman – 1968 NCAA District #2
- Trent Miles – 2010 AFCA Region #4
- Trent Miles – 2012 AFCA Region #4
- Mike Sanford – 2014 AFCA Region #4

=== Conference (8) ===
- Mark Dean – 1952 Indiana Collegiate Conference
- Bill Jones – 1959 Indiana Collegiate Conference
- Bill Jones – 1960 Indiana Collegiate Conference
- Bill Jones – 1963 Indiana Collegiate Conference
- Jerry Huntsman – 1966 Indiana Collegiate Conference
- Dennis Raetz – 1984 Missouri Valley Conference
- Trent Miles – 2010 Missouri Valley Football Conference
- Curt Mallory – 2018 Missouri Valley Football Conference

== Notable alumni ==
=== Sycamores in professional leagues ===
Fifty former Sycamores have played in professional football leagues. The leagues include the National Football League (NFL), Canadian Football League (CFL), Arena Football League (AFL), the United Football League (UFL), and United States Football League (USFL). The most notable players are:

Player	Class Year	Position	Primary Team(s)	Career	Highlight(s)
Jalen Booth	2022	Tackle	Tampa Bay Bandits	2022–present	
Jonas Griffith	2021	OLB	Denver Broncos	2021–present	
Dominique Dafney	2020	TE	Green Bay Packers	2020–present	
Robert Tonyan	2017	TE	Green Bay Packers	2017–present	2020 - Led NFL in 'Touchdowns by TE'; tied Packers record (11 TDs)
Preston Collier	2017	OT	Amarillo Venom	2017–2018	
Jameer Thurman	2016	LB	Calgary Stampeders	2017–present	2018 Grey Cup Champion, 2025 Grey Cup Champion
Shakir Bell	2012	RB	Ottawa Redblacks	2014–2017	2015 Grey Cup Champion, All-American
Jamie Petrowski	2006	TE	Tennessee Titans	2006–2012	3rd Team All-American
Dan Brandenburg	1996	DT	Buffalo Bills	1996–1999	42 Career Games
John Bock	1993	OL	Miami Dolphins	1995–2000	17 Career Starts; Head Coach, Brooklyn Bolts
Vencie Glenn	1986	DB	San Diego Chargers	1986–1995	35 Career INTs
Wayne Davis	1985	DB	San Diego Chargers	1985–1990	5 Career INTs
Eric Robinson	1983	KR	Washington Federals	1983-84	34 Career Games; 1983 All-USFL
Craig Shaffer	1982	LB	St. Louis Cardinals	1982–1984	18 Career Games
Tunch Ilkin	1980	OL	Pittsburgh Steelers	1980–1993	Pittsburgh Steelers All-Time Team, 2x Pro Bowl Lineman

=== All-Star Game participants ===
- 2013 – FN Lutz, OG (FCS Senior Scout Bowl)
- 2010 – Pat Burke, OG (FCS Senior Scout Bowl)
- 2010 – Darrius Gates, RB (FCS Senior Scout Bowl)
- 2006 – Carl Berman, (Magnolia Gridiron Classic)
- 2006 – Kyle Hooper, PK (East Coast Bowl)
- 2006 – Madison Miller, DE (East Coast Bowl)
- 2005 – Blayne Baggett, QB (Magnolia Gridiron Classic)
- 2005 – LaDrelle Bryant, LB (Magnolia Gridiron Classic)
- 1999 – DeJuan Alfonzo, DB (All-Star Gridiron Classic)
- 1995 – Dan Brandenburg, DT (Blue-Gray)
- 1992 – Charles Swann, WR (Senior Bowl)
- 1992 – Charles Swann, WR (Japan Bowl)
- 1990 – Steve Elmlinger, WR (Senior Bowl)
- 1985 – Vencie Glenn, DB (Blue-Gray)
- 1986 – Vencie Glenn, DB (Senior Bowl)
- 1982 – Kirk Wilson, WR (Senior Bowl)
- 1981 – Craig Shaffer, LB (Blue-Gray)

=== Indiana Football Hall of Fame ===
- Vincent Allen – 2000
- Max Andress – 1976
- George Ashworth (ISU Head Coach) – 1979
- Steve Balash – 2009
- Paul Beck – 1979
- Dan Brandenburg - 1995
- Phil Brown (ISU Head Coach) – 1985
- Charles "Cocky" Bush – 1976
- Bob Clayton – 2012
- Robert Clements – 1988
- Jim Conover – 1976
- Rich Dodson – 2003

- Stewart "Red" Faught – 1981
- Wayne Fuson – 1974
- Joe Goodman – 1998
- Delby Humphrey – 1974
- Jerry Huntsman (ISU Head Coach) – 1985
- Bill Jones (ISU Head Coach) – 1981
- Charlie Karazsia – 2006
- Wally Marks (ISU Head Coach) – 1974
- Dick Martin – 1976
- Bob Nesbit – 1976
- Steve Purichia – 2014
- R. Douglas Reeser – 2006

- Ed Robertson – 1996
- Tim Roth – 2014
- Van "Rusty" Rutherford – 1976
- Thomas Stirling – 1988
- Kenneth "Zip" Sypult – 1987
- Phil Teegarden – 2001
- N.E. "Gene" Wernz – 1977
- Mark Wildman – 2007
- Roy Lee Williams – 1976
- Ernie Zeller – 1979
- Maurey Zlotnik – 2003

== Future non-conference opponents ==
Announced schedules as of August 21, 2026.

2026	2027	2028	2029	2030
Southeast Missouri	at Southeast Missouri	at Ball State	Eastern Illinois	at Indiana
at Purdue	at UT Martin	at Eastern Illinois	at Western Illinois	UT Martin
at Eastern Illinois	at Indiana		at Purdue	
Valparaiso	Western Illinois			
