= Vince Allen =

American gridiron football player (born 1955)

Profile
- Position: Halfback

Personal information
- Born: May 13, 1955 (age 71); Richmond, Indiana, U.S.
- Listed height: 5 ft 8 in (1.73 m)
- Listed weight: 180 lb (82 kg)

Career information
- High school: Richmond HS
- College: Indiana State

Career history
- 1978: Hamilton Tiger-Cats
- 1979: Ottawa Rough Riders*
- * Offseason or practice squad member only

Vincent "Vince" Allen (born May 13, 1955) is an American former professional football running back who played for the Hamilton Tiger-Cats of the Canadian Football League. He played in three games during the 1978 CFL season. He played college football at Indiana State University for the Sycamores.

== Early career ==
Allen attended Richmond High School and went on to play college football for the Indiana State Sycamores.

== College career ==
Allen played for the Indiana State Sycamores from 1973 to 1977; he gained over a thousand rushing yards in each of his four seasons, finishing up his playing career with a school-record 832 carries for 4,335 yards. He holds the Indiana State record for most 100-yard career rushing games (26) and most consecutive 100-yard rushing games (14), while adding the most career touchdowns scored (33) for the Sycamores. He also holds the record for most "all-purpose" yards, 940 plays for 5,435 yards.

== Professional career ==
In the middle of the 1978 season, running back Jimmy Edwards of the Hamilton Tiger-Cats suffered a foot injury that forced him to miss multiple games. Allen was signed by the Tiger-Cats to replace Edwards in the starting lineup, but commentators expected him to be cut or face a minimal role after Edwards recovered. Allen played three regular season games with the Tiger-Cats, rushing for 145 yards on 34 carries, including for one touchdown. He also played a role in the passing game, making six catches for 78 yards. As a return specialist, Allen contributed 10 punt returns and four kick returns. He found some success returning punts and kicks, including a 35-yard punt return, but the Tiger-Cats did not retain him as an active player to continue in this role.

Allen was signed by the Ottawa Rough Riders for 1979, and he played in the preseason. He proved productive as a receiver in the preseason, including five catches for 48 yards against the Montreal Alouettes, and he was reported to make a "favorable impression" on the coaching staff. Despite this, he was cut from the roster before the start of the regular season. In late July 1979, cornerback Mike Nelms of the Rough Riders sprained his ankle, and Allen was re-signed to the roster to return punts. He never played in a game for the Rough Riders.
