= Ernie Zeller =

American gridiron football player (1909–1987)

Profile
- Position: Defensive tackle

Personal information
- Born: September 1, 1909; Terre Haute, Indiana
- Died: July 16, 1987 (aged 77); Fort Wayne, Indiana
- Listed height: 6 ft 2 in (1.88 m)
- Listed weight: 245 lb (111 kg)

Career information
- High school: Terre Haute Gerstmeyer (1928)
- College: Indiana State

Career history
- Crosse & Blackwell Chefs (1934); Toronto Argonauts (1935)

Ernie Zeller (September 1, 1909 – July 16, 1987) was an American gridiron football player. He spent two seasons as a tackle in the Canadian Football League.

Zeller played college football at Indiana State. He also wrestled for the Sycamores, though Indiana State did not have a wrestling team. He participated in the 1932 and 1933 NCAA Championships, finishing third in 1933. He competed in the 1932 U.S. Olympic Trials, winning three matches, advancing to the national Finals.

Zeller was signed by the Crosse & Blackwell Chefs as an undrafted free agent in 1934 and played one season there. In his second season, he signed with Toronto; they finished second in their division in the 46th CFL season. During this time, he also wrestled professionally across Canada and the United States.

Following his professional career, Zeller returned to the United States and began a career in education, coaching and officiating; he was the head coach at Robinson High, leading the Maroons to a conference title in 1941.

Zeller was drafted by the United States Navy in 1942 and spent the next four years in uniform; following the war, he returned to his teaching career. He served as the superintendent of the Butler, Indiana schools from 1951 to 1966 and as the vice president of the International Junior College in Fort Wayne, Indiana from 1966 to 1971.
