= Barger Pond =

Lake in New York, U.S.

- Location within New York
- Location: Putnam County, New York, U.S.
- Coordinates: 41.3603°N 73.8132°W
- Type: Pond
- Surface area: 30 acres (12 ha)

Barger Pond is a lake in Putnam County, in the U.S. state of New York. The pond has a surface area of 30 acres (12 ha).

Barger Pond was named after the local Barger family.
