= Ed Lynskey =

American poet

Ed Lynskey is a prolific American poet, critic, and novelist, mostly of hardboiled crime fiction and noir fiction. He was born in 1956 in Washington, D.C., where he still lives and works. Lynskey attended Virginia Tech and received his B.A., History (1979) and M.A., English/Nonfiction Writing (1984) from George Mason University. He did postgraduate literature study at The George Washington University. He writes five mystery series, including the P.I. Frank Johnson Mystery Series, the Isabel & Alma Trumbo Cozy Mystery Series, the Piper & Bill Robin Cozy Mystery Series, the Hope Jones (Nozy Cat) Cozy Mystery Series, the Ginny Dove Cozy Mystery Series, and the Juno Patchen Cozy Mystery Series.

His creative work has been reviewed in Publishers Weekly, Booklist, Library Journal, Kirkus Reviews, Ellery Queen Mystery Magazine, San Diego Union-Tribune, London Free Press, Halifax Chronicle-Herald, Lansing State Journal, The Virginian-Pilot, Tucson Citizen, and Nashville City Paper. Lynskey's work has been favorably compared to that of Loren D. Estleman, James Lee Burke, Daniel Woodrell, Bill Pronzini, and Robert Crais.

His essays have been reprinted by Gale Research and Gryphon Books. He has written book reviews for The New York Times, The Washington Post, The Washington Times , San Francisco Chronicle, Chicago Sun-Times, Kansas City Star, Atlanta Journal-Constitution, Roanoke Times, Des Moines Register, The Plain Dealer (Cleveland, Ohio), and Columbus Dispatch. He has also reviewed books for Paste. His speculative literature has appeared in Strange Horizons, ChiZine, and Alfred Hitchcock Mystery Magazine.

His numerous poems have appeared in such venues as The Atlantic Monthly, American Poetry Review, and Chicago Review. He won the 1993 and 1994 Denny C. Plattner Appalachian Heritage Award in Poetry from Berea College, Kentucky. His work has been anthologized by St. Martin’s Press, University of Virginia Press, and Kent State University Press.

His poem "April Sashays in Lime Heels" received an Honorable Mention in The Year's Best Fantasy and Horror 2007: 20th Annual Collection, Ellen Datlow, editor. His stories were cited in Hardcore Hardboiled, Todd Robinson and Otto Penzler, editors, Kensington Publishing Group, 2008 and Sex, Thugs, Rock & Roll, Todd Robinson, editor, Kensington Publishing Group, 2009.

== Bibliography ==
=== Novels ===
Private Investigator Frank Johnson Mystery series

- The Dirt-Brown Derby (2006)
- The Blue Cheer (2007)
- Pelham Fell Here (2008) - (actually first novel in series published out of sequence)
- Troglodytes (2010)
- The Zinc Zoo (2011)
- After the Big Noise (2014)
- Death Car (2021)
- Bent Halo (2022)
- Clover (2022)
- Fluke (2023)
- Quarry (2023)
- Forge (2023)
- Lure (2023)
- Pawn (2023)
- Noel (2023)
- Grits (2023)
- Blaze (2023)
- Madge (2023)
- Nymph (2023)
- Roz (2023)
- Snatch (2023)
- Crib (2024)
- Traffic (2024)
- Framed (2024)
- Tyrst (2024)
- Iceman (2024)
- Zigzag (2024)
- April (2024)
- Limbo (2024)
- Junked (2024)
- Stalker (2025)
- Call Me (2025)
- Clock (2025)
- Misfit (2025)
- Famine (2025)
- Cabal (2025)
- Mule (2026)
- Sister (2026)
- Firebug (2026)
- Decoy (2027)

Isabel and Alma Trumbo Cozy Mystery Series

- Quiet Anchorage (2011)
- The Cashmere Shroud (2013)
- The Ladybug Song (2014)
- The Amber Top Hat (2015)
- Sweet Betsy (2015)
- Murder in a One-Hearse Town (2016)
- Vi's Ring (2017)
- Heirloom (2017)
- A Big Dill (2018)
- Eve's Win (2019)
- To Dye For (2021)
- Fowl Play (2022)

Robin and Bill Piper Cozy Mystery Series

- The Corpse Wore Gingham (2015)
- Fur the Win (2016)

Juno Patchen Cozy Mystery Series

- Berried Truths (2020)
- Berried Past (2025)
- Berried Clues (2026)

Hope Jones Cozy Mystery Series (written under the pseudonym Lyn Key)

- Nozy Cat 1 (2016)
- Nozy Cat 2 (2017)
- Nozy Cat 3 (2018)
- Nozy Cat 4 (2019)
- Nozy Cat 5 (2024)

Ginny Dove Cozy Mystery Series (written under the pseudonym Lea Charles)

- Found Key (2018)
- Easy Peasy (2021)
- No Picnic (2026)

Stand Alone Novels

- Lake Charles (2011, republished 2018) - Appalachian noir title
- Ask the Dice (2011) - hit man noir title
- Blood Diamonds (2012) - diamond heist title
- The Quetzal Motel (2012) - science fiction title
- Topaz Moon (2014) - suburban noir title
- Wrong Orbits (2015) - suburban noir title
- Cops Like Us (2020) - police novel set in Washington, D.C.
- Outside the Wire: A Washington, D.C. Private Eye Novel (2024) - private investigator novel set in Washington, D.C.
- Skin in the Game (2026) - mobster novel set in Washington, D.C.

== Short story collections ==
- Out of Town a Few Days (2004)
- A Clear Path to Cross (2008)
- Smoking on Mount Rushmore (2013)

== Continuing characters ==
- Frank Johnson - Private detective living in Pelham, Virginia.
- Isabel & Alma Trumbo - Sister sleuths living in Quiet Anchorage, Virginia.
- Piper & Bill Robins - Married couple sleuths living in Beverly Park, Virginia.
- Hope Jones - Single mother and sleuth living with her daughter Stacey in Sweet Springs, Virginia.
- Ginny Dove - Single mother and sleuth living with her son Boone in Canaan, Virginia.
- Juno Patchen - Single mother and sleuth living with her son Chip in Cat's Paw, Virginia.
