= Jules Sylvain Zeller =

French historian (1820–1900)

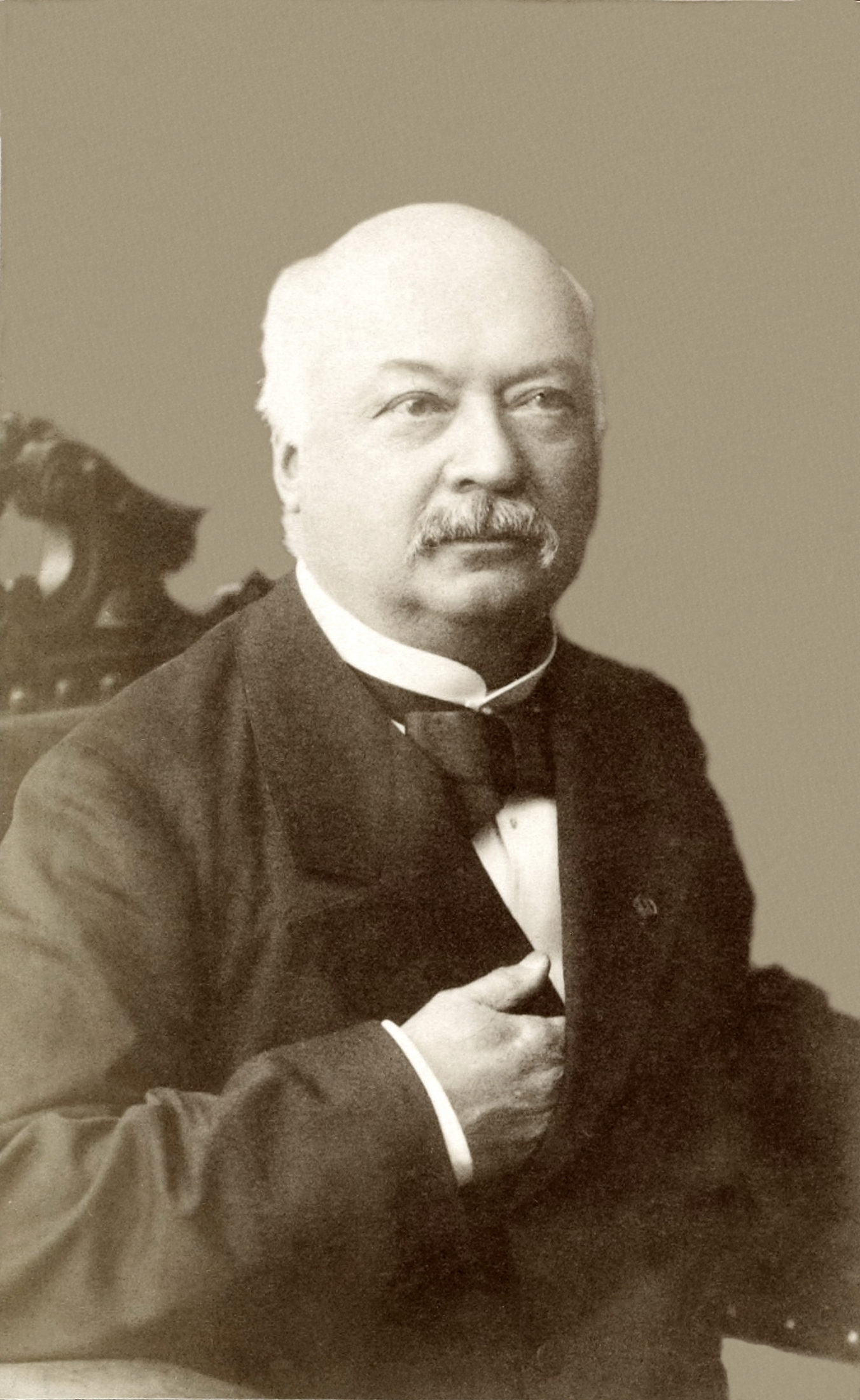
- Born: 23 April 1820
- Died: 25 June 1900 (aged 80)
- Occupations: Historian, Classical Scholar
- Children: Berthold Zeller

Jules Sylvain Zeller (23 April 1820 – 25 July 1900) was a 19th-century French historian.

== Life ==
Born in Paris, Zeller became professor of History at the Faculté de Lettres at Aix-en-Provence in 1854. He became teacher at the École normale supérieure in Paris and lecturer at the Académie de Paris at Sorbonne in 1858, professor at École polytechnique (after Victor Duruy) in 1863, and was 1876 appointed Inspector General over Higher Education. He was elected a Member of the Académie des Sciences morales et politiques (section d'Histoire) of the Institut de France in 1874 after Jules Michelet. He died in Paris.

His son was the historian Berthold Zeller (1848–1899).

== Publications ==
- Ulrich de Hutten, sa vie, ses œuvres, son époque. Histoire du temps de la Réforme (1849)
- Histoire de l'Italie depuis l'invasion des barbares jusqu'à nos jours (1853)
- Épisodes de l'histoire d'Italie. Les Vêpres siciliennes, Nicolas Rienzi, la prise de Rome par le connétable de Bourbon, Masaniello et le duc de Guise (1856)
- Les Empereurs romains, caractères et portraits historiques (1862)
- Abrégé de l'histoire d'Italie depuis la chute de l'Empire romain jusqu'en 1864 (1865) Text online
- Entretiens sur l'histoire, Antiquité et Moyen âge (2 volumes, 1865)
- Entretiens sur l'histoire du XVIe siècle. Italie et Renaissance (1868)
- Histoire d'Allemagne (7 volumes, 1872-1891)
- Les Tribuns et les révolutions en Italie : Jean de Procida, Arnaud de Brescia, Nicolas Rienzi, Michel Lando, Masaniello (1874) Text online
- Pie IX et Victor-Emmanuel, histoire contemporaine de l'Italie, 1846-1878 (1879)
- François Ier (1882)
- Henri IV (1882)
- Italie et Renaissance : politique, lettres, arts (1882-1883)
- Louis XI (1884)
- Histoire résumée d'Italie, depuis la chute de l'Empire romain jusqu'à la fondation du royaume italien, à la mort de Pie IX et de Victor-Emmanuel II (1886)
- Histoire résumée de l'Allemagne et de l'Empire germanique, leurs institutions au Moyen âge (1889)
- Editor 1860-1853 of L'année historique.
