= Royal Dixon =

American botanist and animal rights activist

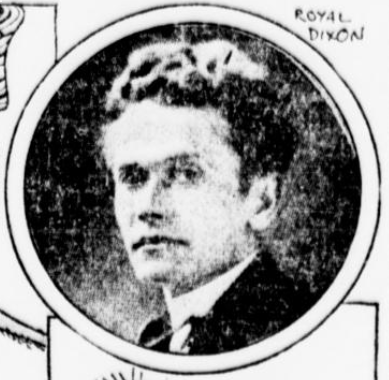
- Born: 25 March 1885; Huntsville, Texas
- Died: 4 June 1962 (aged 77)
- Occupations: Botanist, writer

Royal Dixon (25 March 1885 – 4 June 1962) was an American animal rights activist, botanist, philosopher, and a member of the Americanization movement. He was the founder of the First Church for Animal Rights in 1921.

== Biography ==
Dixon was born at Huntsville, Texas on 25 March 1885 to Elijah and Francis Elizabeth Dixon. He was educated at the Sam Houston Normal Institute, Morgan Park Academy, Chicago and later as a special student at the University of Chicago. His earliest career was as a child actor and dancer trained by Adele Fox. His last theatre appearance was in 1903 as an actor with the Iroquois theater in Chicago. He became a curator at the department of botany at the Field Museum of Chicago from 1905 to 1910. He subsequently became a staff writer at the Houston Chronicle. He also made special contributions to the newspapers of New York City, where he lectured for the Board of Education and founded a school for creative writing. His interest and attention were later directed to immigration, as a director of publicity of the Commission of Immigrants in America, and as managing editor of The Immigrants in America Review. He published a book on how immigrants needed to be "americanized" into a single uniform culture.

== Philosophy ==
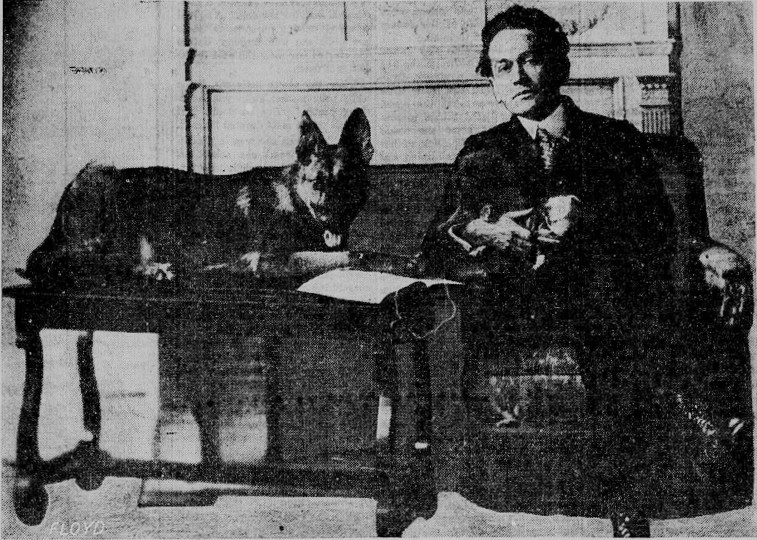
Royal Dixon in 1921 with a police dog "monitoring" his preaching. According to him dogs took to the Ten Commandments faster than other animals.

Dixon's philosophical world-view was essentially panpsychic. From his studies in botany and natural science he held the view that everything was alive and that even insects and plants have personality. For example, in his book The Human Side of Plants he argued that plants are sentient and have minds and souls. A review in the Nature journal described the book as "partly a rebound from a hortus siccus botany, partly an uncritical vitalism, and partly a somewhat saddening illustration of the lack of critical balance." The review was disappointed by this because Dixon cited many interesting facts about plants including their adaptations and movements but was criticized for anthropomorphism when comparing plant activities to humans.

Dixon was a Christian who believed that the scriptures imply that "man and beasts" equally share a future life beyond physical death. In his book The Personality of Water-Animals he wrote that "the Greatest of all teachers Christ knew the value of marine education for he chose as his disciples men thoroughly acquainted with the sea".

== First Church of Animal Rights ==
In 1921, Dixon founded the First Church for Animal Rights in Manhattan and it had a membership of 300 people. The inauguration of the church was held on 13 March 1921 at the Hotel Astor. Speakers at the inauguration included Mrs Diana Belais, Mrs Edwin Markham, Dr John Edward Oster, Mrs Margaret Crumpacker, Miss Jessie B. Rittenhouse, Dr. A. L. Lucas and Miles M. Dawson.

The First Church of Animal Rights held a service each Sunday at the Hotel Astor. An "Animal Bible" was to be used at the Sunday service. This Bible contained chapters from both the Old and New Testaments dealing with humaneness to animals.

A full list of the church's objectives included:

- To preach and teach the oneness of all life, and awaken the humane consciousness
- To champion the cause of animals' rights
- To develop the character of youth through humane education
- To train and send forth humane workers
- To awaken the realization that every living creature has the inalienable right to life, liberty and the pursuit of happiness
- To act as a spiritual fountain-head and spokesman of human organizations and animal societies, and give a better understanding of their work and needs to the public.

Dixon is cited as an early activist and philosopher of animal rights. Historian Roderick Nash has commented that "Dixon tried to call Americans' attention to the idea that all animals have "the inalienable right to life, liberty and the pursuit of happiness".

== Personal life ==
Dixon lived with his partner, a local artist, Chester Snowden. Dixon's letters and works are archived at the University of Houston Library. Dixon was buried in Houston's Glenwood Cemetery.

== Selected publications ==
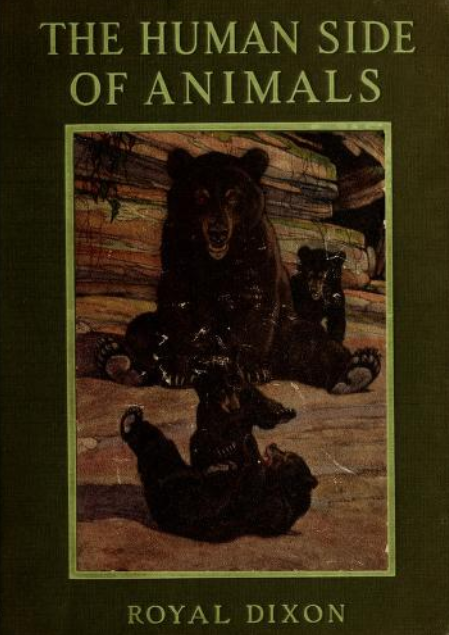
The Human Side of Animals, 1918

- The Human Side of Plants (1914)
- Signs is Signs (1915)
- Americanization (1916)
- Forest Friends (1916)
- The Human Side of Trees: Wonders of the World (with Franklyn Everett Fitch, 1917)
- The Human Side of Birds (1917)
- The Human Side of Animals (1918)
- Hidden Children (1922)
- Personality of Plants (with Franklyn Everett Fitch, 1923)
- Personality of Insects (with Brayton Eddy, 1924)
- The Personality of Water-Animals (with Brayton Eddy, 1925)
- The Ape of Heaven (1936)
- Half Dark Moon (1939)
