= Johann Gottfried Zeller =

German physician (1656–1734)

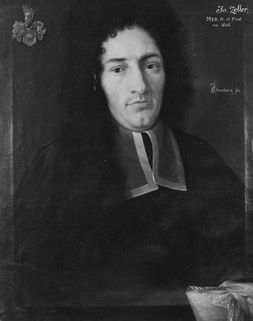
Portrait of Johann Zeller

Johann Gottfried Zeller (5 January 1656 - 7 April 1734) was a German physician and medical writer.

== Life ==
He was born in Lienzingen, a hamlet in Mühlacker in the Duchy of Württemberg. His parents wished for him a career as a religious minister, but he chose to study medicine at the University of Tübingen. He then traveled through France, Holland, and Germany in furtherance of a doctorate. In 1684, he obtained a post with the Count of Oettingen. He returned to mainly teach at Tübingen. He traveled in 1716 to Vienna to attend to the pregnancy of the Austrian empress.

== Works ==
- De vasorum Lymphaticorum administratione et phaenomenis secundum et praeter naturam
- Quod pulmonis in aqua subsidentia infanticidas non absolvat - describes that the sinking of a lung does not prove a newborn was not alive
- Vita humana ex funiculo pendens (1692)
- Molae viriles mirabiles (1696)
- De Morbis ex structura glandularum praeternaturali natis (1698)
- De gonorrhaea virulenta in utroque sexu (1700)
- Quastio docimastica super causam et noxas vini lithargirio mangonisati, variis experimentis illustrata (1707)
- Dissertatio de mammis et lacte 1727
- Celebrium Wurtenbergiae nostae acidularum Teinacensium examen (1727)
- De ectropio, accedunt in prefatione de cataracta membranacea observationes (1733)
