= Belle Zeller =

American political scientist

- Born: Bella Zulkowich; April 8, 1903; New York, New York, U.S.
- Died: May 22, 1998 (age 95); New York, New York, U.S.
- Occupations: Political scientist, college professor, labor leader

Belle Zeller (April 8, 1903 – May 22, 1998), originally Bella Zulkowich, was an American political economist and labor leader. She was a professor at Brooklyn College, and led the union of City University of New York (CUNY) professors for over thirty years.

== Early life and education ==
Zeller was born in New York City, one of the nine children of Davis Zeller and Celia Zeller. Her parents were Jewish immigrants from Eastern Europe. She graduated from Hunter College High School and from Hunter College, where she earned a bachelor's degree in 1924, and a master's degree in 1926. She completed a Ph.D. in political science at Columbia University in 1937, with a dissertation titled Pressure Politics in New York, about lobbying in the state legislature. She was a member of Phi Beta Kappa.

== Career ==
Zeller was one of the founding professors of Brooklyn College. She was promoted to the rank of full professor in 1951, against the protests of the Joint Committee Against Communism in New York City. She chaired the Legislative Conference of the City Colleges, which became the union representing CUNY professors, from 1944 to 1972. The Legislative Conference merged with the United Federation of College Teachers in 1972; she was president of the merged body, called the Professional Staff Congress, for another four years, until she retired in 1976.

Zeller was one of many Brooklyn College professors subpoenaed and appearing a hostile witness before the Rapp-Coudert Committee in 1940. She served on the executive council of the American Political Science Association from 1947 to 1949. In 1953 she spoke to the National Municipal League's annual conference. She testified before a congressional hearing on public employee organizations in 1972. In 1976, she toured the United States, consulting on collective bargaining for public employees. In 1979 the Professional Staff Congress established the Belle Zeller Scholarship Trust Fund in recognition of her decades of service to CUNY and the union. In 1980 she received the President's Medal from Brooklyn College, to mark the school's 50th anniversary celebration.

== Publications ==
Zeller's research concerned state legislatures and the regulation of lobbying and pressure groups. Her articles appeared in scholarly journals including Public Administration Review, American Political Science Review, and The Annals of the American Academy of Political and Social Science.

- Pressure Politics in New York (1937, reprinted 1967)
- "State Agencies and Lawmaking" (1942, with Elisabeth McK. Scott and Frieda S. Miller)
- "The Federal Regulation of Lobbying Act" (1948)
- "The Repeal of P.R. in New York City—Ten Years in Retrospect" (1948, with Hugh A. Bone)
- "Regulation of Pressure Groups and Lobbyists" (1958)
- American State Legislatures (editor and co-author)

== Personal life ==
Zeller survived being hit by a bus when she was 83. She died in 1998, at the age of 95, at her home in Manhattan.
