= Marwa =

Marwa may refer to:

== Places ==
- Marwa (mandap), an open hut for auspicious ceremonies of Maithil Upanayan and Maithil Vivah.
- Al-Safa and Al-Marwah, hills in Saudi Arabia
- Marwah, a subdivision of Kishtwar district, Jammu and Kashmir, India
- Marwa Thermal Power Plant, power station near Marwa village in Janjgir–Champa district, Chhattisgarh, India

== People ==
- Marwa (name), Arabic feminine given name, or Kuria masculine given name; also a surname

== Arts and entertainment ==
- Marwas or Minwas, a small double-sided hand drum originally from the Middle East
- "Marwa Blues", an instrumental by English musician George Harrison
- Marwa and al-Majnun al-Faransi, a classical Middle Eastern love story

== See also ==
- Marva (disambiguation)
- Marfa (disambiguation)
- Marwah (disambiguation)
