= Mervat =

Mervat (Egyptian Arabic: ميرفت or ميرڤت) is a feminine given name used in Egypt. Notable people with the given name include:

- Mervat Amin (born 1946), Egyptian actress
- Mervat Seif el-Din (born 1954), Egyptian classical archaeologist and museum director
- Mervat Tallawy (born 1937), Egyptian diplomat and politician
- Mervat Toto (born 1981), Syrian politician

== See also ==
- Marwa (name)
- Merve
