= Marfa =

Marfa may refer to:

== Music ==
- Marfa (instrument), an African percussion instrument
- Marfa (music), celebratory music of the Hyderabadi Muslims

== Places ==
- Márfa, a village in Baranya county, Hungary
- Marfa, Chad
- Marfa, Texas, a city in the high desert of the Trans-Pecos in western Texas
- Marfa, Malta, a port near Ċirkewwa, Mellieħa in northern Malta

== Other uses ==
- Marfa (given name)
- CFR Marfă, a state-owned freight railway business of Romania
- Marfa, a sub-group of the Maba people of north-central Africa
  - Marfa language, a Maban language spoken in Chad
- Marfa front, another term for a dry line
- Marfa lights, a possible paranormal phenomena frequently visible near Marfa, Texas

== See also ==
- Marwa (disambiguation)
- Mafra
