= Marfa (given name) =

Marfa (Russian: Марфа) is an East Slavic given name, a variant of Martha.

- Marfa Alekseyevna of Russia (1652–1707), Moscow Tsarina and Orthodox saint
- St. Martha of Tambov, 18th-century Russian Orthodox saint
- Marfa Apraksina (1664–1716), second wife of Tsar Feodor III of Russia
- Marfa Boretskaya, 15th-century mayoress of Novgorod and a staunch opponent of Ivan III of Russia
- Marfa Dhervilly (1876–1963), French stage and film actress
- Marfa Ekimova (born 2005), Russian born British rhythmic gymnast
- Marfa Inofuentes Pérez (1969–2015), Afro-Bolivian activist
- Marfa Kokina (died after 1800), Russian industrialist
- Marfa Kryukova (1876–1954), Russian folklore performer and storyteller
- Marfa Rabkova (born 1995), Belarusian human rights activist
- Marfa Dmitrievna Sharoiko (1898–1978), Soviet-Belarusian politician
- Marfa (or Marta) Samuilovna Skavronskaya (1684–1727), better known as Catherine I of Russia
- Marfa Sobakina (1552–1571), third wife of Ivan the Terrible, Tsar of Russia
- Marfa Tymchenko (1922–2009), Ukrainian artist and master of Petrykivka painting style

== See also ==
- Marfa (disambiguation)
