= Marva (given name) =

Marva is a given name. Notable people with the name include:

- Marva Beck (born 1944), American politician
- Marva Collins (1936–2015), American educator
- Marva Dawn (1948-2021), American Christian theologian, author, musician and educator
- Marva L. DeLoach, American librarian and educator
- Marva Hicks (1956-2022), American singer and actress
- Marva Jean Brooks, wife of Muddy Waters, American blues singer
- Marva Josie, American jazz singer
- Marva Mollet (born 1943), the Belgian singer known professionally as Marva
- Marva Smith, American judge
- Marva Whitney (1944–2012), American funk singer
- Marva Wright (1948-2010) American blues singer

== See also ==
- Marwa (name)
- Marwah (disambiguation)
