= Marwa (name) =

Marwa or Marwah
- Pronunciation: Arabic pronunciation: [marwaː]
- Gender: Female

Origin
- Meaning: "White stone"
- Region of origin: Arabia

Other names
- Related names: Merve, Marva, Marveh, Mervat

Marwa or Marwah (Arabic: مروة) is an Arabic female given name derived from the word marū/maruw (مرو) with the meaning of either minerals, 'flint(-stone)', 'quartz' or 'a hard stone of nearly pure silica'. However, the Arabic name for quartz is ṣawwān (صَوَّان).

The name is written Marva in the Persian form. During the Ottoman Period, the name was written Mervat (Ottoman Turkish: مرفت) or Marwa (مروا), or Merve in the modern Turkish form.

For the Kuria people, Marwa is used as a masculine name, reserved for the firstborn male in a family, along with names Chacha or Mwita. Firstborn girls are called either Bhoke, Robi, or Gati.

The male variant of this given name is Marwan. Marwa is also a surname.

== Given name ==
- Marwa Abdi Bashir Hagi, Somali politician
- Marwa Abidi (born 1990), Tunisian footballer
- Marwa Amri (born 1989), Tunisian freestyle wrestler
- Marwa Arsanios (born 1978), Lebanese artist, researcher and filmmaker
- Marwa Daoudy, Swiss associate professor of international relations
- Marwa Elselehdar, Egyptian female ship captain
- Marwa Hassan (born 2004), Egyptian entrepreneur and fashion influencer on social media
- Marwa Hassani (born 2002), French-born Moroccan footballer
- Marwa Hussein (born 1978), Egyptian hammer throw athlete
- Marwa Khmiri, Tunisian footballer
- Marwa Loud (born 1996), French singer of Moroccan origin
- Marwa Al-Sabouni (born 1981), Syrian architect and writer
- Marwa El-Sherbini (1977–2009), Egyptian woman murdered in a courtroom in Dresden, Germany
- Marwa Range (born 1977), Kenyan football referee
- Marwa Sultan (born 1983), Egyptian sport shooter
- Marwa Zein (born 1985), Afro-Arab film director, scriptwriter and film producer

== Middle name ==
- Dickson Marwa Mkami (born 1982), Tanzanian long-distance runner

== Surname ==
- Agnes Marwa (born 1978), Tanzanian politician
- Amarjeet Singh Marwa (born 1947), Kenyan field hockey player
- Asmita Marwa, Indian fashion designer
- Emil Marwa (born 1974), British actor
- Harvinder Singh Marwa (born 1943), Kenyan field hockey player
- Hisham Marwa, Syrian lawyer, director of the legal office of the Syrian National Council
- Joseph Marwa (boxer) (born 1964), Tanzanian boxer
- Mohammed Buba Marwa (born 1953), Nigerian Brigadier General
- Samson Mwita Marwa (1932–2022), Kenyan member of parliament

== See also ==
- for articles on persons with this first name
- Maitatsine, born Mohammed Marwa, controversial Islamic scholar
- Marwa (disambiguation)
