= Marva (disambiguation) =

Marva is the Israel Defense Forces youth basic training program.

Marva may also refer to:

- Marva (raga) or Marwa (IAST: Mārvā), a hexatonic Indian raga
- Marva (thaat), one of the basic thaats of Hindustani music
- Marva, one of the subdivisions of Kaunas
- Marva (given name)

== See also ==
- Marwa (disambiguation)
- Marwah (disambiguation)
