= Layla and Majnun =

Ancient Arabic love story

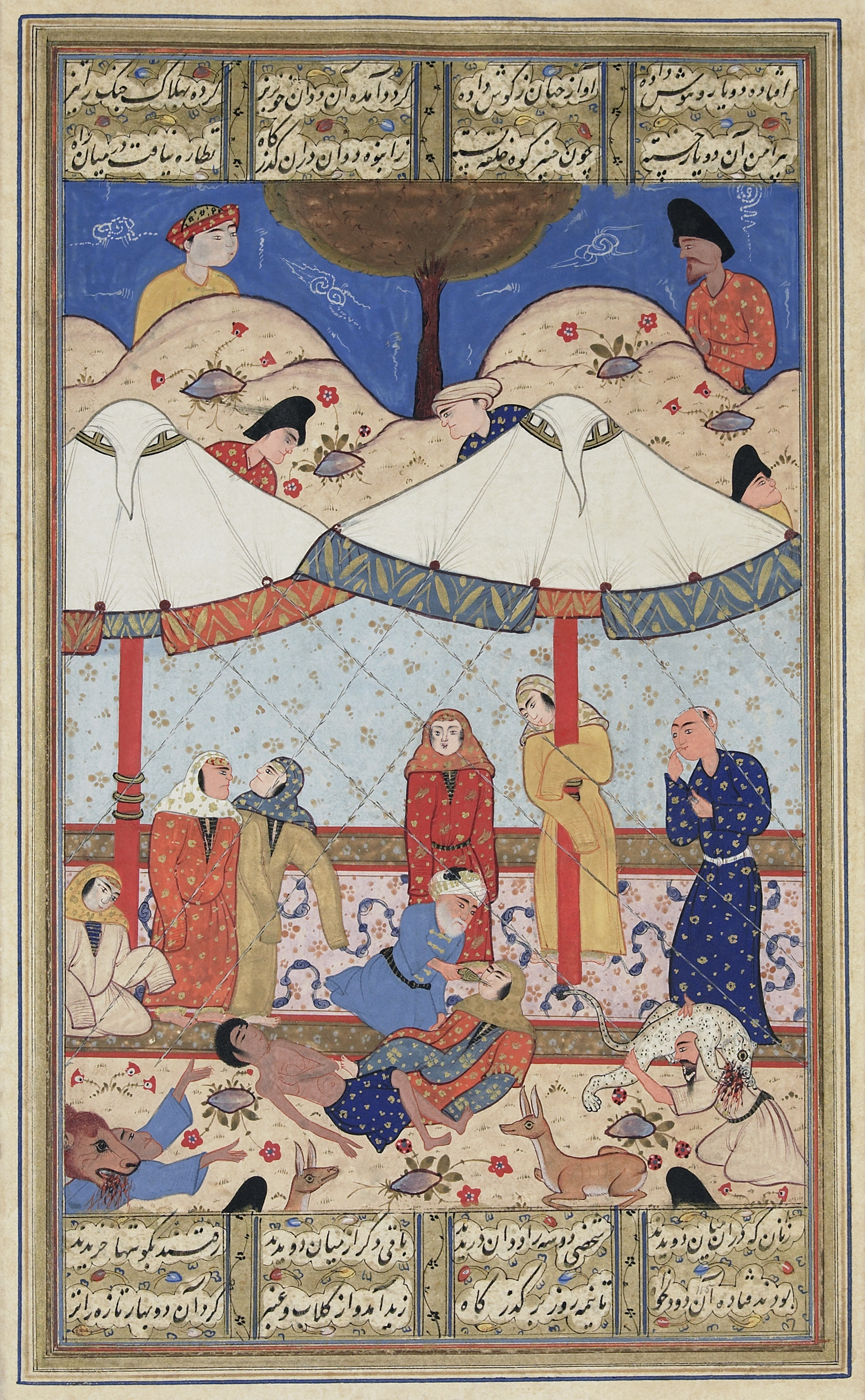
A miniature of Nizami's narrative poem. Layla and Majnun meet for the last time before their deaths. Both have fainted and Majnun's elderly messenger attempts to revive Layla while wild animals protect the couple from unwelcome intruders. Late 16th-century illustration.

Layla and Majnun (Arabic: مجنون ليلى majnūn laylā "Layla's Mad Lover"; Hindustani: मजनूँ लैला, ,مجنوں لیلی majnun layla; Persian: لیلی و مجنون, romanized: laylâ o majnun) is an early-medieval Arabic love story about the 7th-century poet Qays ibn al-Mulawwah and his lover Layla al-Amiriyah. The story originates from Najd in present-day Saudi Arabia, with Qays and Layla traditionally associated with Al-Aflaj Governorate and the city of Layla, which is named after Layla al-Amiriyah. Their tragic love story became one of the most famous romances in Arabic literature and inspired adaptations throughout the Islamic world.

"The Layla-Majnun theme passed from Arabic to Persian, Turkish, and Indic languages", through the narrative poem composed in 1188 CE by the Persian poet Nizami Ganjavi, as the third part of his Khamsa. (Note: Nizami's tragic romance Khosrow and Shirin is another part of the Khamsa.) It is a popular poem praising their love story.

Qays and Layla fell in love with each other when they were young, but when they grew up, Layla's father did not allow them to be together. Qays became obsessed with her. His tribe, Banu Amir, and the community gave him the epithet of Majnūn (مجنون "crazy"). Long before Nizami, the legend circulated in anecdotal forms in Iranian akhbar. The early anecdotes and oral reports about Majnun are documented in Kitab al-Aghani and Ibn Qutaybah's Al-Shi'r wa-l-Shu'ara'. The anecdotes are mostly very short, only loosely connected, and show little or no plot development. Nizami collected both secular and mystical sources about Majnun and portrayed a vivid picture of the famous lovers. Subsequently, many other Persian poets imitated him and wrote their own versions of the romance. Nizami drew influence from Udhrite (Udhri) love poetry, which is characterized by erotic abandon and attraction to the beloved, often by means of an unfulfillable longing.

Many imitations have been contrived of Nizami's work, several of which are original literary works in their own right, including Amir Khusrow Dehlavi's Majnun o Leyli (completed in 1299), and Jami's version, completed in 1484, amounting to 3,860 couplets. Other notable reworkings are by Maktabi Shirazi, Hatefi (died 1520), and Fuzuli (died 1556), which became popular in Ottoman Turkey and India. Sir William Jones published Hatefi's romance in Calcutta in 1788. The popularity of the romance following Nizami's version is also evident from the references to it in lyrical poetry and mystical masnavis—before the appearance of Nizami's romance, there are just some allusions to Layla and Majnun in divans. The number and variety of anecdotes about the lovers also increased considerably from the twelfth century onwards. Mystics contrived many stories about Majnun to illustrate technical mystical concepts such as fanaa (annihilation), divānagi (love-madness), self-sacrifice, etc. Nizami's work has been translated into many languages. The modern Arabic-language adaptation of the classical Arabic story include Shawqi's play The Mad Lover of Layla.

== Story ==
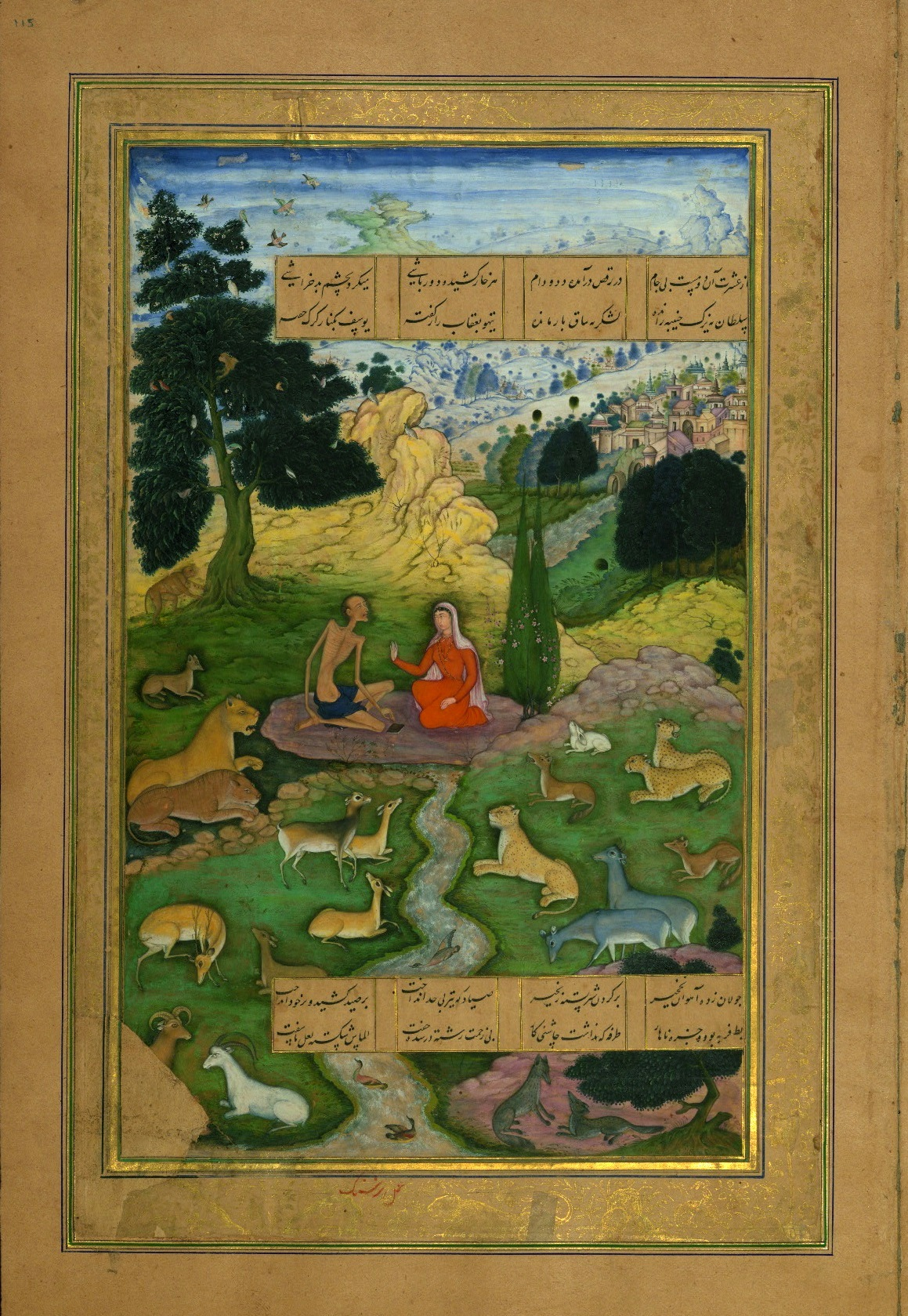
A Mughal miniature of Amir Khusro's version; Walters Art Museum

Qays ibn al-Mullawah (Majnun) fell in love with Layla al-Aamiriya. He soon began composing poems about his love for her, mentioning her name often. His obsessive effort to woo the girl caused some locals to call him "Majnun", or mentally unhinged. When he asked for her hand in marriage, her father refused because it would be a scandal for Layla to marry someone considered mentally unbalanced. Soon after, Layla was forcibly married to another noble and rich merchant belonging to the Thaqif tribe in Ta'if. He was described as a handsome man with reddish complexion whose name was Ward Althaqafi. The Arabs called him Ward, meaning "rose" in Arabic.

When Majnun heard of her marriage, he fled the tribal camp and began wandering the surrounding desert. His family eventually gave up hope for his return and left food for him in the wilderness. He could sometimes be seen reciting poetry to himself or writing in the sand with a stick.

After Majnun went mad, he searched for love in the desert. He is disconnected from the physical world.

Layla is generally depicted as having moved to a place in Northern Arabia with her husband, where she became ill and eventually died. In some versions, Layla dies of heartbreak from not being able to see her beloved. Majnun was later found dead in the wilderness in 688 AD, near Layla's grave. He had carved three verses of poetry on a rock near the grave, which are the last three verses attributed to him.

Many other minor incidents took place between his madness and his death. Most of his recorded poetry was composed before his descent into madness.

I pass by this town, the town of Layla
And I kiss this wall and that wall
It's not Love of the town that has enraptured my heart
But of the One who dwells within this town

It is a tragic story of undying love much like the later Romeo and Juliet. This type of love is known as "virgin love" because the lovers never marry or consummate their passion. Other famous virgin love stories set in Arabia are the stories of Qays and Lubna, Kuthair and Azza, Marwa and Al Majnoun Al Faransi, and Antara and Abla. This literary motif is common throughout the world, notably in the Muslim literature of South Asia, such as Urdu ghazals.

== Lineage of Qays and Layla ==
Layla is the daughter of Qays' cousin. Both Qays and Layla, descended from the tribe of Hawazin and the tribe of Banu Ka'b (the patriarch Ka'b), which is also related to the direct lineage of Muhammad of Islam. Therefore, they are descendants of Adnan, who is Ishmaelite Arab descendant of (Ishmael), son of Ibrahim (Abraham). Their lineage is narrated from Arabic records as follows:

=== Qays ===
Qays' lineage: Qays bin Al-Mulawwah bin Muzahim bin ʿAds bin Rabīʿah bin Jaʿdah bin Ka'b bin Rabīʿah bin ʿĀmir ibn Ṣaʿṣaʿa bin Muʿawiyah bin Bakr bin Hawāzin bin Mansūr bin ʿAkramah bin Khaṣfah bin Qays ʿAylān bin Muḍar bin Nizār bin Maʿadd bin ʿAdnan.

He is the ʿĀmirī (descended from Banu Amir) of the Hawāzin (العامري الهوازني, al-ʿĀmirī 'l-Hawāzinī).

In Arabic:

قيس بن الملوّح بن مزاحم بن عدس بن ربيعة بن جعدة بن كعب بن ربيعة بن عامر بن صعصعة بن معاوية بن بكر بن هوازن بن منصور بن عكرمة بن خصفة بن قيس عيلان بن مضر بن نزار بن معد بن عدنان

Qays was born around 645 AD (AH 24 in the Hijri) in the Najd and died around 688 AD (AH 68 in the Hijri) during the reign of the fifth Umayyad caliph Abd al-Malik ibn Marwan in the 1st century of the Hijri in the Arabian Desert.

Qays is one of the two Al-Qaisayn poets Al-Mutaymīn (Arabic: المتيمين), the other being Qays bin Dharīḥ (قيس بن ذريح), dubbed "Majnūn Lubna (مجنون لبنى)". It is narrated (by a woman) that Qays died in the year 68 AH (corresponding to 688 AD), found lying dead among stones (where Layla was buried) and his body was carried to his family.

=== Layla ===
Layla's lineage: Laylā binti Mahdī bin Saʿd bin Muzahim bin ʿAds bin Rabīʿah bin Jaʿdah bin Ka'b bin Rabīʿah bin Hawāzin bin Mansūr bin ʿAkramah bin Khaṣfah bin Qays ʿAylān bin Muḍar bin Nizār bin Maʿadd bin ʿAdnan.

She was called "Umm Mālik (أم مالك)".

In Arabic:

ليلى بنت مهدي بن سعد بن مزاحم بن عدس بن ربيعة بن جعدة بن كعب بن ربيعة بن عامر بن صعصعة بن معاوية بن بكر بن هوازن بن منصور بن عكرمة بن خصفة بن قيس عيلان بن مضر بن نزار بن معد بن عدنان

Layla was born around 648 AD (AH 28 in the Hijri) in the Najd, and the date of her death is unknown. She died during the reign of the fifth Umayyad caliph Abd al-Malik ibn Marwan in the 1st century of the Hijri in the Arabian Desert.

Layla is born four years after Qays in a town called an-Najūʿ(النجوع) in the tribe of Banu Amir. The town is called by her name "Layla" today, and is the capital of Al-Aflaj province in the Riyadh Region in Saudi Arabia.

== Location ==
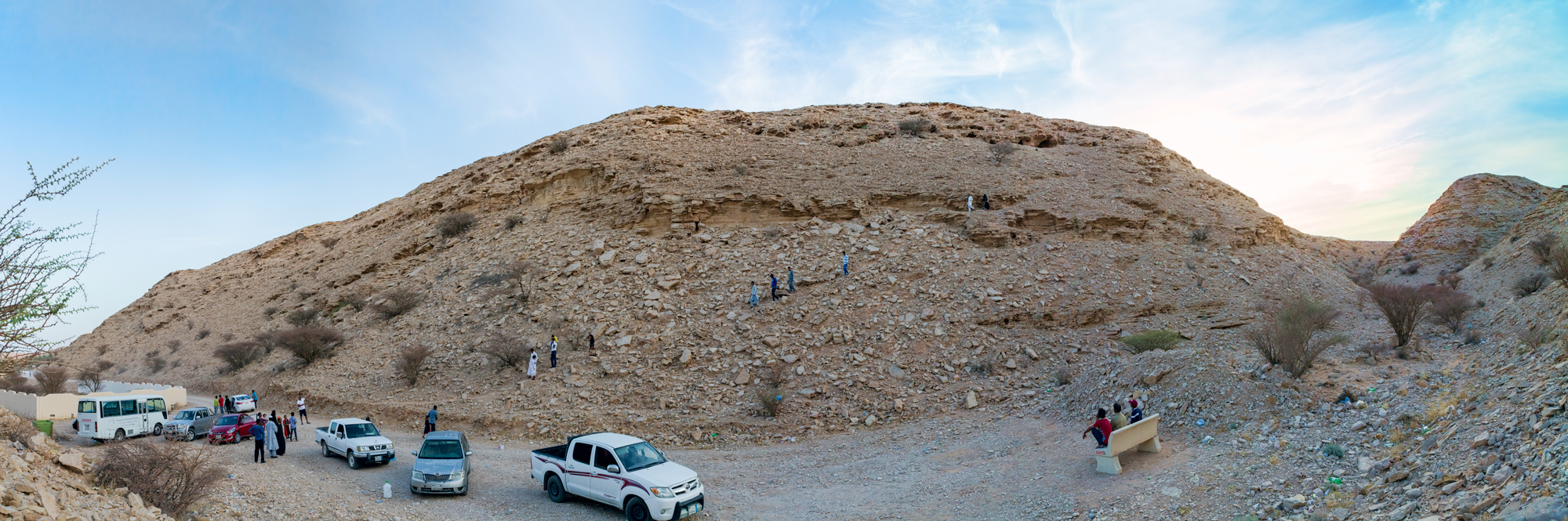
Jabal Al-Toubad, the hill where the story of Qays and Layla is said to have been witnessed

It is believed from Arab oral tradition that Qays and Layla were born in what is now the province of Al-Aflaj in Saudi Arabia, and where the town of "Layla" has existed.

Jabal Al-Toubad (جبل التوباد) is located in the city of Al-Aflaj, 350 km southwest of the city of Riyadh in Saudi Arabia. Jabbar (جبار) is located near the village of Al-Ghayl (الغيل), in the center of Wadi Al-Mughal (وادي المغيال). This hill witnessed the love story of Qais bin al-Mulawwah and his cousin Laila al-Amiriya, in the 65th year of the Hijri (685 AD) during the reign of the Umayyad caliph Abd al-Malik bin Marwan.

The Persian poet Nasir Khusraw visited the town of "Layla" in the 5th century AH (1009–1106 CE) and described the town accurately along with the hill Jabal Al-Toubad, and elaborated on the misery that it had turned into as he spent a few months there. The region was overwhelmed by poverty, internal strife and insecurity.

== History and influence ==
=== Indian adaptation and Indian literature ===
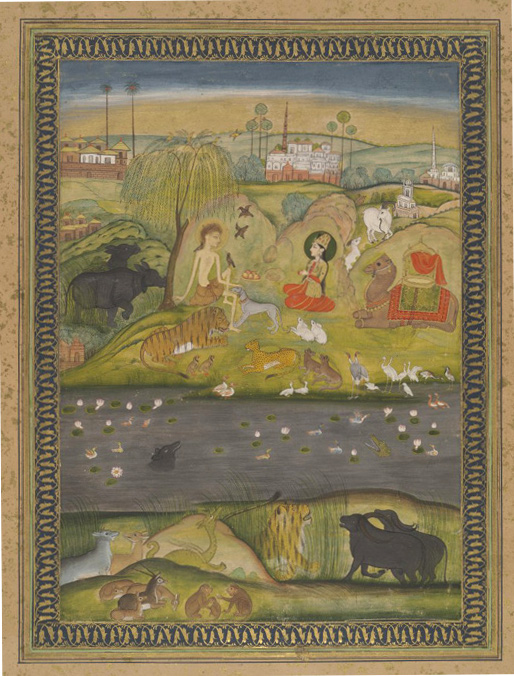
Layla visits Majnun in the wilderness; Indian watercolour held by the Bodleian Library

In India, it is believed that Layla and Majnun found refuge in a village in Rajasthan before they died. The graves of Layla and Majnun are believed to be located in the Bijnore village near Anupgarh in the Sri Ganganagar district. According to rural legend there, Layla and Majnun escaped to these parts and died there. Hundreds of newlyweds and lovers from India and Pakistan, despite there being no facilities for an overnight stay, attend the two-day fair in June.

In the modern day, the Indian adaptations of Majnun Layla enjoys similar popularity, within South Asia, and draws parallels to Shakespeare’s Romeo & Juliet, with Majnun often characterised as an obsessive ishq-driven lover.

=== Persian adaptation and Persian literature ===
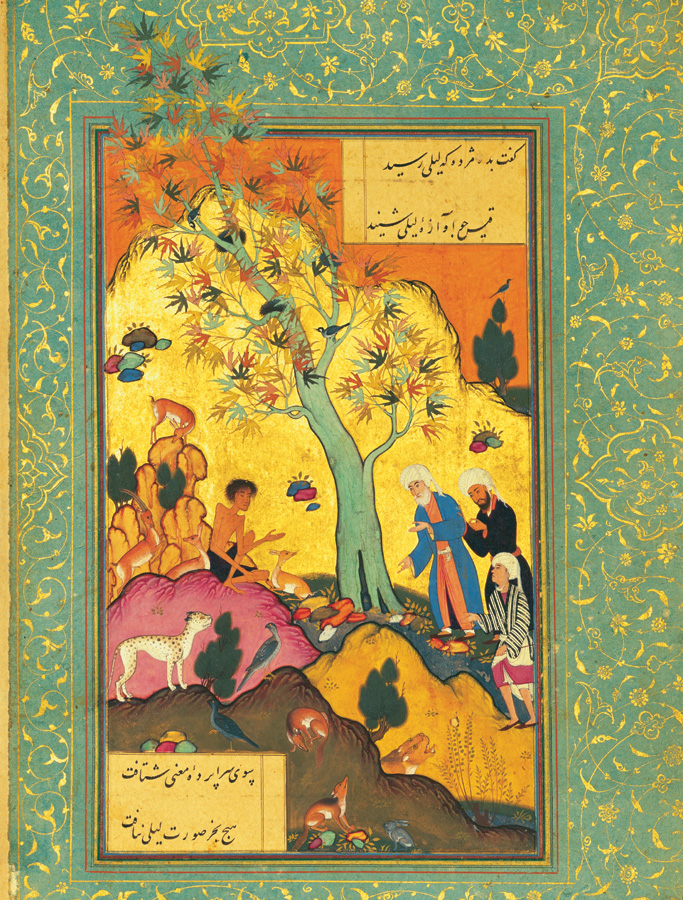
Majnun in the wilderness

The story of Layla and Majnun was known in Persia as early as the 9th century. Two well known Persian poets, Rudaki and Baba Taher, both mention the lovers.

Although the story was known in Arabic literature in the 5th century, it was the Persian masterpiece of Nizami Ganjavi that popularized it dramatically in Persian literature. Nizami collected both secular and mystical sources about Majnun and portrayed a vivid picture of the famous lovers. Subsequently, many other Persian poets imitated him and wrote their own versions of the romance. Nizami drew influence from Udhrite love poetry, which is characterized by erotic abandon and attraction to the beloved, often by means of an unfulfillable longing. Other influences include older Persian epics, such as Vāmiq u 'Adhrā, written in the 11th century, which covers a similar topic of a virgin and her passionate lover; the latter having to go through many trials to be with his love.

In his adaptation, the young lovers become acquainted at school and fell desperately in love. However, they could not see each other due to a family feud, and Layla's family arranged for her to marry another man. According to Dr. Rudolf Gelpke, "Many later poets have imitated Nizami's work, even if they could not equal and certainly not surpass it; Persians, Turks, Indians, to name only the most important ones. The Persian scholar Hekmat has listed no less than forty Persians and thirteen Turkish versions of Layli and Majnun." According to Vahid Dastgerdi, "If one would search all existing libraries, one would probably find more than 1000 versions of Layli and Majnun."

In his statistical survey of famous Persian romances, Ḥasan Ḏulfaqāri enumerates 59 'imitations' (naẓiras) of Layla and Majnun as the most popular romance in the Iranian world, followed by 51 versions of Ḵosrow o Širin, 22 variants of Yusuf o Zuleikha and 16 versions of Vāmiq u ʿAḏhrā.

=== Azerbaijani adaptation and Azerbaijani literature ===
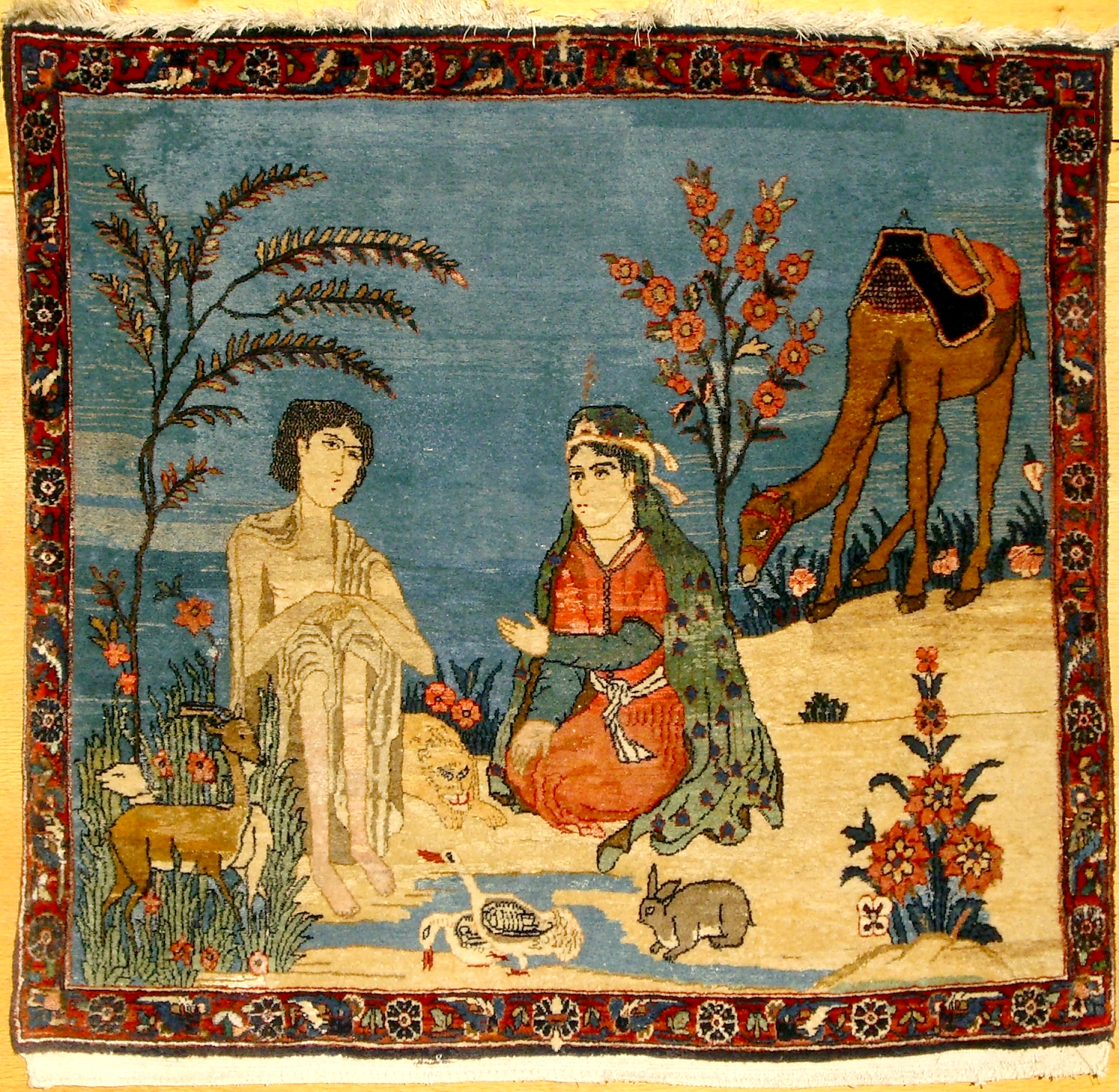
Azerbaijani folk art based on the Layla and Majnun poem by Nizami Ganjavi

The story of Layla and Majnun was introduced to Azerbaijani literature through Fuzuli's interpretation in his lyric poem Leyli and Majnun, written in 1535. (Note: While most sources indicate that the work was completed in 1535, the Encyclopædia Iranica states that it was finished in 1536.) This interpretation of the story generated more interest than previous Arabic and Persian versions, which the Turkish literature scholar İskender Pala attributes to the sincerity and lyricism of the poet's expression. The work has been described by the Encyclopædia Iranica as "the culmination of the Turk[ic] masnavi tradition in that it raised the personal and human love-tragedy to the plane of mystical longing and ethereal aspiration". Through his interpretation, the story of Layla and Majnun became widely known and Fuzuli's poem is considered one of the greatest works of Turkic literature.

The first opera in the Islamic world, Leyli and Majnun, was composed by the Azerbaijani composer Uzeyir Hajibeyov in 1908 and based on Fuzuli's work of the same name.

== Other influences ==
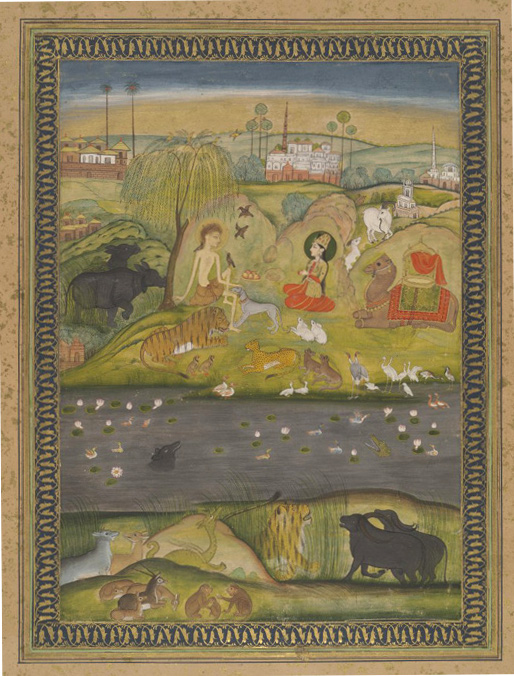

The enduring popularity of the legend has influenced Middle Eastern literature, especially Sufi writers, in whose literature the name Layla refers to their concept of the Beloved. The original story is featured in Bahá'u'lláh's mystical writings, the Seven Valleys. In the Arabic language, the word Majnun means "a crazy person." In addition to this creative use of language, the tale has also made at least one linguistic contribution, inspiring a Turkish colloquialism: to "feel like Mecnun" is to feel completely possessed, as might be expected of a person who is literally madly in love. A related Arabic colloquialism is "Each man cries for his own Layla" (Arabic: كل يبكي على ليلاه).

This epic poem was translated into English by Isaac D'Israeli in the early 19th century allowing a wider audience to appreciate it.

Layla has also been mentioned in many works by Aleister Crowley in many of his religious texts, including The Book of Lies.

== Popular culture ==
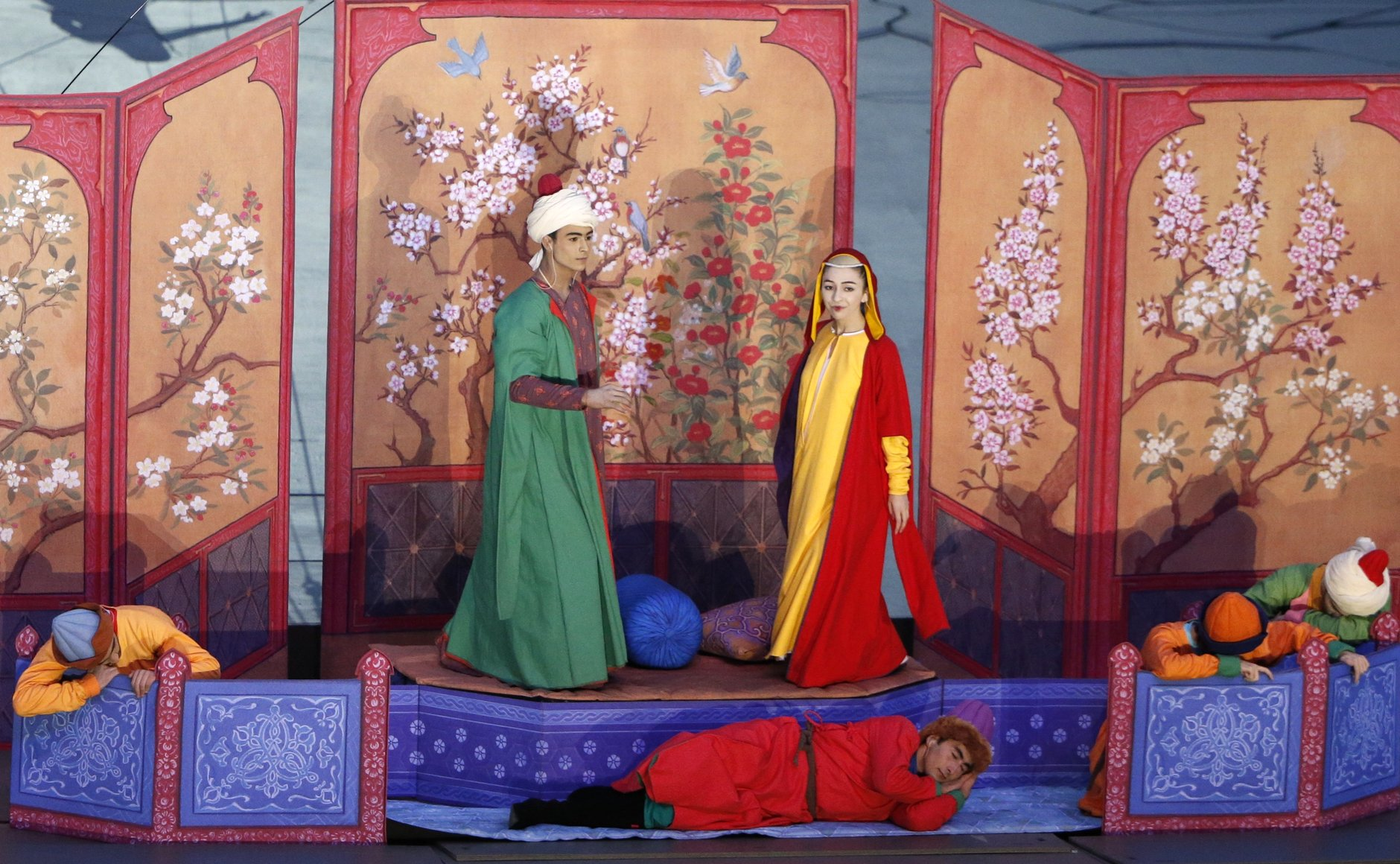
Layla and Majnun at the opening ceremony of the 2015 European Games in Baku

- In the Gilded Wolves trilogy by Roshani Chokshi, one of the main characters, named Layla, calls another main character "Majnun".
- The tale and the name "Layla" served as Eric Clapton's inspiration for the title of Derek and the Dominos' album Layla and Other Assorted Love Songs and its title track in 1970. The song "I Am Yours" is a direct quote from a passage in Layla and Majnun.
- Tedeschi Trucks Band released I Am the Moon in 2022, a four-part album inspired by Layla and Majnun.
- In Humayun Ahmed's Noy Number Bipod Sanket, a song written by him and rendered by Meher Afroz Shaon and S I Tutul, is titled Laili-Mojnu, Shiri-Forhad, Radha-Krishna.
- In Cassandra Clare's Chain of Gold, half Persian character Cordelia Carstairs is nicknamed Layla as a term of endearment and to show her family's love of the story.
- In Gary Jennings' novel The Journeyer, a fictionalized Marco Polo is told by a Persian physician that Layla and Majnun possessed the magical ability to transform their bodies at will, changing their appearance, age, or gender, even becoming animals or mythical creatures; and that they would then copulate in various combinations of these forms, as inspiration for their poetry. The physician is also an alchemist, and has concocted a drug intended to recreate this ability. Marco tries it on himself and a prostitute, with disastrous results.
- The tale served as the inspiration for Halim El-Dabh's early electronic tape music composition called Leiyla and the Poet in 1959.
- The tale of Layla and Majnun has been the subject of various films produced by the Indian film industry beginning in the 1920s. One, Laila Majnu, was produced in 1976. In 2007, the story was enacted as both a framing story and as a dance-within-a-movie in the film Aaja Nachle. Also, in pre-independence India, the first Pashto-language film was an adaptation of this story.
- Orhan Pamuk makes frequent reference to Leyla and Majnun in his novels, The Museum of Innocence and My Name is Red.
- One of the panels in the Alisher Navoi metro station in Tashkent (Uzbekistan) and Nizami Gəncəvi metro station in Baku (Azerbaijan) represents the epic on blue green tiles.
- In the book A Thousand Splendid Suns by Afghan author Khaled Hosseini, Rasheed often refers to Laila and Tariq as Layla and Majnun.
- South African author Achmat Dangor, of mixed Indian descent, makes reference to Leyla and Majnun in his novels, "Waiting for Leila" and "Kafka's Curse"
- On Gaia Online, a recent monthly collectible released an item under the names Majnun and Layla loosely based on the story.
- Layla and Majnun – poem of Alisher Navoi.
- Layla and Majnun – poem of Jami.
- Layla and Majnun – poem of Nizami Ganjavi.
- Layla and Majnun – poem of Fuzûlî.
- Layla and Majnun – poem of Hagiri Tabrizi.
- Layla and Majnun – drama in verse of Mirza Hadi Ruswa.
- Layla and Majnun – novel of Necati.
- Leyli and Majnun – the first Muslim and the Azerbaijani opera of Uzeyir Hajibeyov (1908).
- Layla and Majnun – symphonic poem of Gara Garayev (1947).
- Leyli and Majnun – ballet by Gara Garayev (1969).
- Symphony No. 24 ("Majnun"), Op. 273 (1973), for tenor solo, trumpet, choir and strings – Alan Hovhaness.
- The Song of Majnun – opera of Bright Sheng (1992)
- Laila Majnu – Indian Hindi silent film in 1922.
- Laila Majnu – Indian Hindi silent film in 1927.
- Laila Majnu – Indian Hindi film in 1931.
- Laila Majnu – Indian Hindi film in 1931.
- Laila Majnun — Malayan Malay film in 1933.
- Majnu – Indian Hindi film of 1935 by Roshan Lal Shorey.
- Layla and Majnun – Iranian film in 1936.
- Laila Majnu – Indian Hindi film of 1945 by Nazir, starring Nazir and Swarnalata.
- Laila Majnu – Indian Telugu film in 1949.
- Laila Majnu – Indian Hindi film of 1953 directed by K. Amarnath, starring Shammi Kapoor and Nutan.
- Laila – Indian Hindi film of 1954 directed by Naseem Siddique, starring Shakila.
- Ishq-e-Laila – 1957 Pakistani film featuring Sabiha Khanum and Santosh Kumar.
- Laila Majnu – 1957 Pakistani film starring Bahar and Aslam Pervaiz
- Layla and Majnun – Tajik Soviet film-ballet of 1960.
- Layla and Majnun – Soviet Azerbaijani film of 1961.
- Laila Majnu – Indian Malayalam film in 1962.
- Leyli va Majnun – Iranian films in 1970 directed by Siamak Yasam
- Leyla ile Mecnun – Turkish drama film of 1972 starring Fatma Girik and Kadir İnanır.
- Dastan-E-Laila Majnu – Indian Hindi film of 1974 by R.L. Desai, starring Dheeraj Kumar and Anamika.
- Laila Majnu – Pakistani film in 1974 starring Waheed Murad and Rani.
- Laila Majnu – Indian Hindi film in 1976.
- Laila Majnu – Indian Bengali film of 1976 by Sachin Adhikari.
- Laily Majnu – Bangladeshi film in 1976 starring Razzak and Babita.
- Majnoon – unreleased Indian Hindi film from 1979 by Kamal Amrohi, starring Rajesh Khanna and Rakhee Gulzar.
- Leyla ile Mecnun – Music album of Orhan Gencebay in 1981.
- Leyla İle Mecnun – Turkish film of 1982 starring Orhan Gencebay and Gülşen Bubikoğlu.
- Sun Meri Laila – Indian Hindi film of 1983 by Chander H. Bahl, starring Deepika Chikhalia and Raj Kiran.
- Laila – Indian Hindi film of 1984 by Saawan Kumar Tak, starring Poonam Dhillon and Anil Kapoor.
- Love And God (1986) — Indian Hindi film directed by K. Asif
- Leyla und Medjnun – 1988 opera by Detlev Glanert.
- Layla and Majnun – Azerbaijani film-opera of 1996.
- Majnoon – 2003 Indian film by Aashish Chanana, starring Chanana and Sucheta Khanna set in the modern Bollywood industry.
- Aaja Nachle— a 2007 Indian film has a 15-minute musical play on life of Layla and Majnun.
- Majnoon Layla— is a song on Omar Offendum's debut solo album SyrianamericanA, retelling the story as a rap song
- Leyla ile Mecnun – is a Turkish television comedy series in 2011.
- Habibi – is a 2011 film by Susan Youssef filmed in the Gaza Strip.
- Double Barrel – is a Malayalam Movie in 2015.
- Tamasha – is a Hindi movie of 2015. A musical story in this movie has parts of Laila Majnu duet.
- Laila The Musical – British theatre production by Rifco Arts, Watford Palace Theatre and Queen's Theatre Hornchurch toured England during 2016.
- Layla and Majnun – dance-drama, a collaboration of Mark Morris, Silk Road Ensemble and Howard Hodgkin; 2016 premiere by Cal Performances.
- Laila Majnu – is a 2018 Hindi movie based on the legend of Laila Majnu set in Kashmir.
- Ye Kahani Hai Laila Majnu Ki – Indian Bhojpuri film of 2020 by Mahmud Alam, starring Pradeep Pandey, Sonalika Prasad, and Akshara Singh.
- In Prince of Persia: The Lost Crown, the titular character Sargon wields twin swords named after Qays and Layla. Such a naming is an anachronism, as the game is set in pre-Islamic time, during the age of Achaemenid dynasty.

== See also ==
- Khosrow and Shirin
- Muna Madan
- Sassui Punhun

== Sources ==
- Macit, Muhsin (2013). "FUZÛLÎ". Türk Edebiyatı İsimler Sözlüğü (in Turkish). Ahmet Yesevi University.
- Macit, Muhsin (2014). "Fuzuli, Mehmed b. Süleyman". In Fleet, Kate; Krämer, Gudrun; Matringe, Denis; Nawas, John; Rowson, Everett (eds.). Encyclopaedia of Islam (3rd ed.). Brill Online. doi:10.1163/1573-3912_ei3_COM_27220. ISSN 1873-9830.
- Pala, İskender (2003). "Leylâ vü Mecnûn". TDV Encyclopedia of Islam, Vol. 27 (Kütahya Mevlevîhânesi̇ – Mani̇sa) (in Turkish). Istanbul: Presidency of Religious Affairs, Centre for Islamic Studies. pp. 162–164. ISBN 978-975-389-408-1.
- Skilliter, S. A. (February 1972). "Leylᾱ and Mejnūn, by Fuzūlī, translated from the Turkish. With a history of the poem, notes, and bibliography by Alessio Bombaci (translated from the Italian by Elizabeth Dairies)". Bulletin of the School of Oriental and African Studies. 35 (1). London: George Allen and Unwin: 156–157. doi:10.1017/S0041977X0010758X.
- Yarshater, Ehsan, ed. (2000). "Fożūlī, Moḥammad". Encyclopædia Iranica. Vol. X/2: Forūḡī–Fruit. London and New York: Routledge & Kegan Paul. pp. 121–122. ISBN 978-0-933273-41-2.
