= Merve =

Merve is a feminine given name of Turkish origin. It originates from the Arabic feminine name Marwa. It has two meanings:

- Pebble
- One of the two sacred hills in Mecca, Saudi Arabia, between which Muslims travel back and forth seven times as part of the ritual pilgrimages. Merve is mentioned in Surah Bakara, verse 158.

According to the General Directorate of Civil Registration and Nationality of Turkey, Merve was the most popular female name between 1991 and 2000. Notable people with the name include:

== Given name ==
- Merve Adıyaman (born 1994), Turkish handball player
- Merve Aladağ (born 1993), Turkish footballer
- Merve Atlıer (born 2000), Turkish volleyball player
- Merve Aydın (born 1990), Turkish middle distance runner
- Merve Aydın (basketball) (born 1994), Turkish basketball player
- Merve Boluğur (born 1987), Turkish actress
- Merve Büyüksaraç (born 1988), Turkish model
- Merve Çağıran (born 1992), Turkish actress
- Merve Çelebi (born 1993), Turkish-Cypriot volleyball player
- Merve Çoban (born 1993), Turkish karateka
- Merve Dalbeler (born 1987), Turkish volleyball player
- Merve Daşdemir (born 1987), Turkish-Dutch musician
- Merve Demir (born 2001), Turkish para table tennis player
- Merve Dinçel (born 1999), Turkish taekwondo practitioner
- Merve Dizdar (born 1986), Turkish actress
- Merve Durdu (born 1996), Turkish handball player
- Merve Emre, Turkish-American academic, author, and literary critic
- Merve Erbektaş (born 1996), Turkish handball player
- Merve Nur Eroğlu (born 1993), Turkish Paralympic archer
- Merve İzbilir (born 1997), Turkish volleyball player
- Merve Karadeniz, Turkish freestyle wrestler
- Merve Kavakçı (born 1968), Turkish politician
- Merve Kenger (born 1993), Turkish wrestler
- Merve Kuryluk (born 1937), Canadian ice hockey player
- Merve Özbey (born 1988), Turkish singer and songwriter
- Merve Sevi (born 1987), Turkish actress
- Merve Tanıl (born 1990), Turkish volleyball player
- Merve Terzioğlu (1987–2008), Turkish swimmer
- Merve Tuncel (born 2005), Turkish swimmer
- Merve Uslu (born 1994), Turkish para judoka
- Merve Uygül (born 1988), Turkish basketballer
- Merve Vatan (born 2005), Turkish windsurfer
- Merve Yazıcı (born 1992), Turkish taekwondo practitioner
- Merve Yenidünya (born 2004), Turkish arm wrestler
