= Layla (town) =

City in Riyadh Province, Saudi Arabia

Layla ليلى
- City
- Location within Saudi Arabia
- Coordinates: 22°18′4″N 46°43′.4″E
- Country: Saudi Arabia
- Province: Riyadh Province
- Governorate: Al-Aflaj Governorate
- Named for: Layla al-Amiriyah

Government
  - Type: Municipality
  - Body: Al-Aflaj Municipality

Population (2022)
  - Total: 29,698
- Time zone: UTC+03:00 (SAST)
- ISO 3166-2: SA-01
- Area code: 011

Layla (Arabic: ليلى) is a city in Riyadh Province, Saudi Arabia, and the administrative seat of Al-Aflaj Governorate. The city is named after Layla al-Amiriyah, lover of the renowned poet Qays ibn al-Mulawwah, whose story became one of the most famous love stories in Arabic literature and inspired the romance of Layla and Majnun.

== See also ==
- Provinces of Saudi Arabia
- List of governorates of Saudi Arabia
- List of cities and towns in Saudi Arabia
