= Laila Majnu Ki Mazar =

Mausoleum in Rajasthan, India

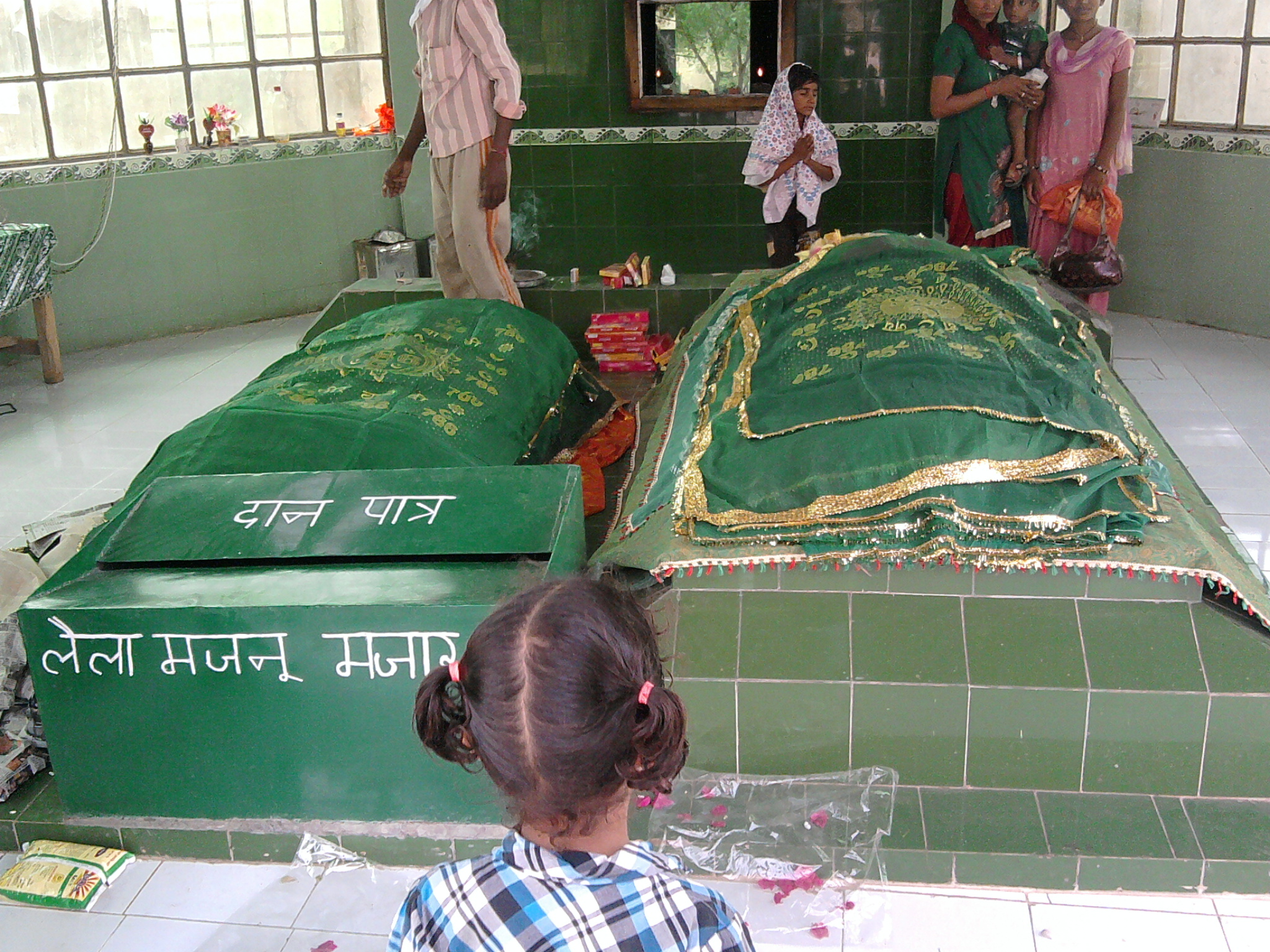
- The graves of Layla and Majnun, where people come to seek blessings
- Location: Binjaur, near Anupgarh, Sri Ganganagar district, Rajasthan, India
- Type: Mausoleum

Laila Majnu Ki Mazar (lit=the mausoleum of Layla and Majnun) is situated at Binjaur, a village near Anupgarh in the Sri Ganganagar district of Rajasthan. According to the local legend, the famous lovers Laila and Majnu died here. A fair, held annually in the month of June, is attended by hundreds of couples and newlyweds.

== Mazar and its background ==
Many people associate this Mazar with the lovers Laila and Majnun. According to them, Laila-Qais were from Sindh and came to this place escaping from the clutches of Laila's parents and her brother, who were against love of Laila-Majnun. But, there was a huge sand dune during that time and they could not cross the desert because they were thirsty and finally Laila's parents followed them to only find them both dead in the desert. Thus, this place became a symbol of love and people come here to seek blessings of Laila and Majnu. According to the local people, on festivals, couples come to the graves of Laila and Majnu to seek their blessings for lifelong togetherness.

Some people, such as Rani Raisikh, one of the early caretakers of this Mazar, the mausoleum is not related to the mythical Laila-Majnu but are the two graves of a great teacher and his devoted student. The mausoleum is a symbol of mutual respect and love between that teacher and his student.

== Development of the Mausoleum ==
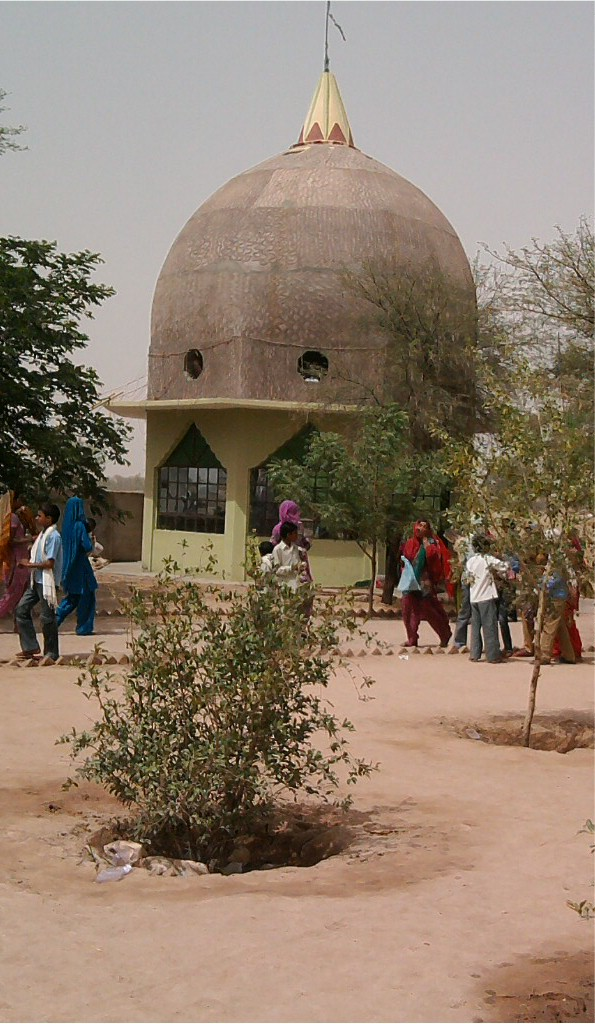
Tomb of Laila Majnun where two graves are located

The mausoleum is part of old graveyard of Muslims and Hindus. In the beginning, these graves were under a shed cover. According to a local legend, miracles made people devotees of the grave and people began to visit this place. Now a small room (tomb) has been built here.

== Annual fair ==
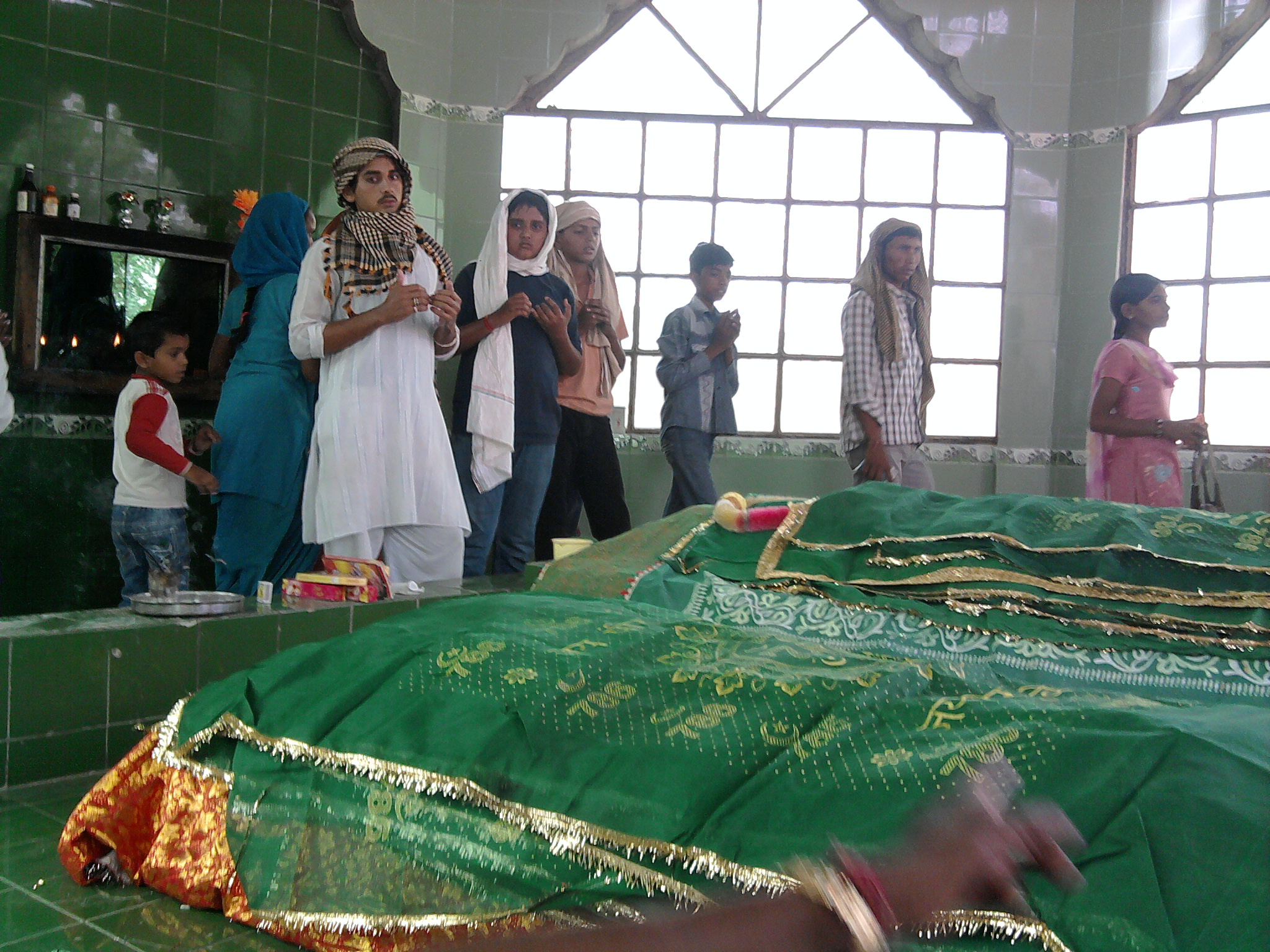
Inside tomb people are offering prayers

Hundreds of people visit this place for a fair, in the month of June (14 June). Many couples get lined up here to seek blessings from legendary Laila-Majnun. The visitors a lay a chadar (cloth-sheet) on their holy shrines and offer prayers.

During the fair, prasaad and Langar (free meal) is offered to the visitors by devotees. At night, devotional song's programmes are also organised by devotees.

Before the Kargil war, this place was also open for Pakistani visitors. Later, the border was closed for them.
