= Marwa Abdi Bashir Hagi =

Puntland politician

- Marwa Cabdi Bashiir Xaaji مروة عبدي بشير حاجي

Member of the Federal Parliament of Somalia
- Incumbent
- Assumed office 2022
- Constituency: Puntland

Personal details
- Education: Algonquin College/University

Marwa Abdi Bashir Hagi (Somali: Marwa Cabdi Bashiir Xaaji), (Arabic: مروة عبدي بشير حاجي); is Puntland politician and member of parliament, She is Deputy Chairperson of the Resources Committee in Somali Parliament. On October 27, 2023, Marwa participated as a candidate for the President of the Inter-Parliamentary Union (IPU). The election was won by Tulia Ackson from Tanzania National Assembly.

== Biography ==
Marwa Abdi Bashir Hagi has been a member of the Somali Parliament has been elected 2022. She is also the Deputy Chairperson of the Resources Committee. Marwa is fluent in Somali, English, and Arabic. She has supporting consultants, monitoring project activities, conducting value chain assessments, and delivering training and technical assistance.

=== Education ===
Marwa Abdi Bashir studied Business Administration at Algonquin College/University in Ottawa, Canada, where she obtained a bachelor’s degree. She also has training in Information Communication Technology.
