= Leyli and Majnun (ballet) =

1969 Azerbaijani ballet by Gara Garayev

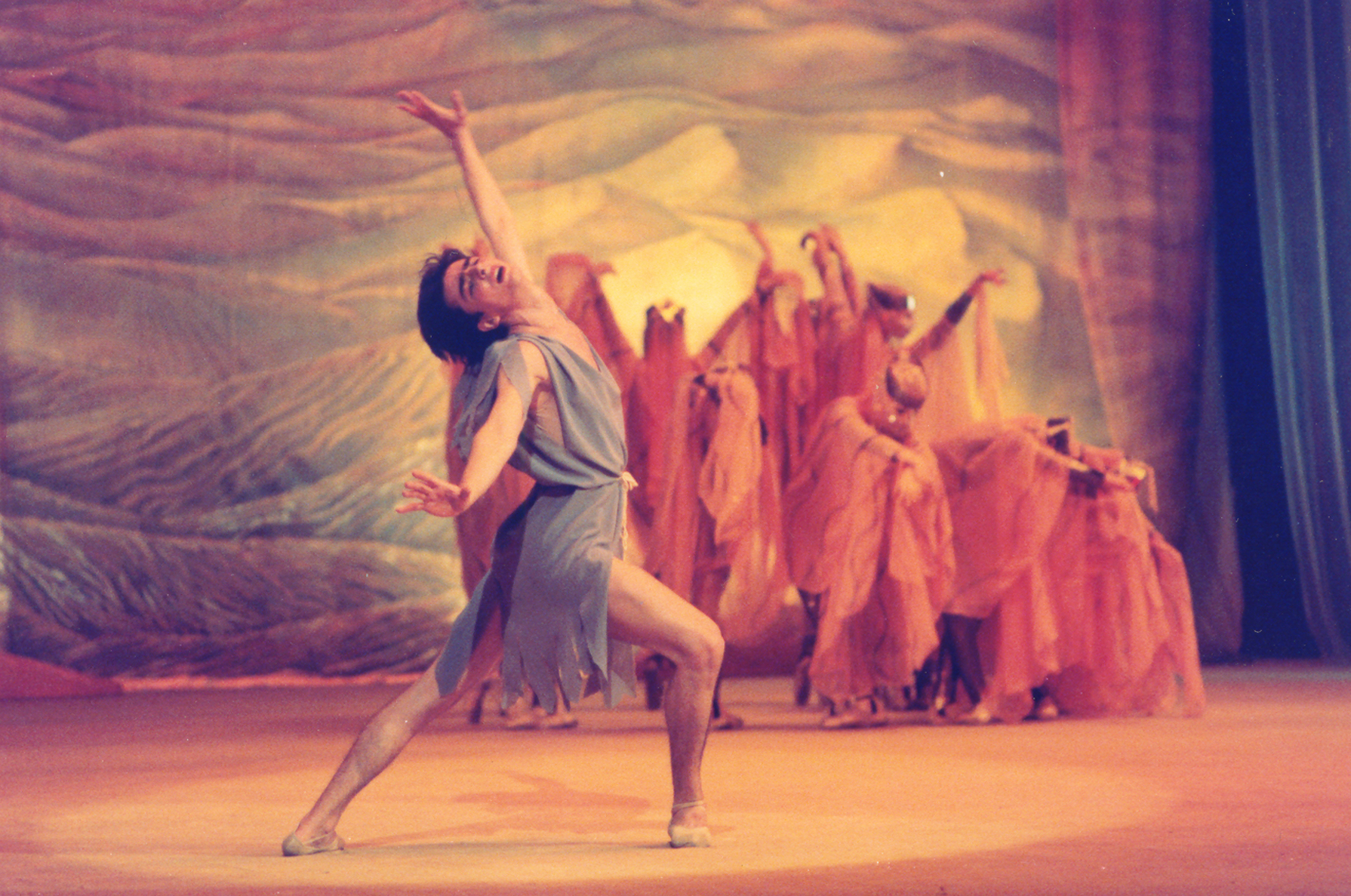
Scene from the 2001 production

Leyli and Majnun (Azerbaijani: Leyli və Məcnun) a classic Persian story of love couple; it is a one-act ballet by Azerbaijani composer Gara Garayev. The libretto is based on Nizami Ganjavi's poem Layla and Majnun (the third book of the Khamsa, 12th century). The choreographer of the original production was Nelya Nazirova. The premiere, conducted by R. D. Abdullayev, took place on 25 May 1969 at the Azerbaijan State Academic Opera and Ballet Theater in Baku, with V. N. Pletnev as Majnun and T. N. Mamedova as Leyli. Nazirova's production was the basis of the ballet film In the World of Legends that was filmed by the creative association Ekran in 1975.

In 2001, choreographer Georgy Aleksidze carried out a new production of Leyli and Majnun. The performance took place on 17 February (soloists R. Iskenderov and G. Mirzayev), and on 4 December of the same year the ballet was shown on the stage of the Bolshoi Theater, during a tour in Moscow.

== Classical story of Leyla and Majnu ==
The classical story of Leyla and Majnu, which was called the "Romeo and Juliet of the Orient" by Lord Byron, has been swarmed since a long times, in Arabic, Persian, Azerbaijani and Indian cultures. The tale of Layla and Majnun is as well known in Asia as Romeo and Juliet is in Europe.

The parents of both Leyli and Majnun were not pleased with their love, so both of two lovers were separated, Leyli was married forcefully with another man, but she remained in obsessions of Majnun all the day, whereas, Majnu, due to the tragic separation from his beloved, retreats and go to the jungle, He prefers the company of the wild animals rather than that of men. There he communicates with the wild beasts and recites his poetry for Leyli. He becomes exhausted due to shunning the all bodily and psychological desires, his health continually declines and eventually Majnu dies in the wild. Although, both the lover doesn't meet in the life, but they are reunited after their death.

== See also ==
- Leyli and Majnun (opera)
