= Marwa and al-Majnun al-Faransi =

Marwah wa al-Majūn al-Faransi (Arabic: مروة و المجنون الفرنسي) is a classical Middle Eastern love story. It is based on the legend of a young man named Shams al Faransy (Arabic: شمس الفرنسي بن الصحارى) from Central Asia, born during the 15th century. There were many Arabic versions of the story at the time.

Majnoun on his horse Hawa (هوة) and his faithful dove Basata

== Story ==
Shams al-Faransi (or al-Faransawi) ibn Fattuta ibn Rumi was a poet, sailor, explorer, translator, writer, and linguist (born May 2, 1373; year of death uncertain, possibly 1458 or 1467), most probably one of the sons of famous explorer Ibn Battuta. He became famous for his poetry and adventurous life. He was most probably born in Afghanistan, but lived in Spain, in Andalucia as a disciple of famous Arab philosophers in the tradition of Averroes, in Morocco, Egypt and parts of Africa. He traveled to Venice, where he became close to French poet Christine de Pizan and became known as Al-Faransi ("the Frenchman").

He continued his travels and fell in love with Marwa bint Ahmad on his trip back to Spain, while he was in Cairo. They fled together to Europe and he wrote songs about his love for her. When they arrived in Europe he asked for her hand in marriage, but was sent by the Caliph to Africa, promising he would return soon after he accomplished his mission. She gave him a silver medallion with a poem by Mansour al-Hallaj. She also gave him a piece of wood that she carved with his name, and he never parted with this piece of wood, wherever he traveled. The medallion and the carving were found in his tomb in 1937 and kept at the Kabul Museum, but were stolen during the war in 2002.

While he was in the desert, he was held prisoner by a tribe of the ruthless Zaghawa warriors. In the meantime, Marwa was introduced to another man, who was more suitable according to Arab traditions.

Majnoun reciting poetry in the desert

This type of love is known in Arabic culture as “Virgin Love” (Arabic: حب عذري), because the lovers never married or had sex. Other famous Virgin Love stories are the stories of Qays and Lubna, Kuthair and Azza, Layla and Majnun and Antarah ibn Shaddad. His observations on the flight of his dove and of a desert Eagle led him to write poems on flying and dreams of taking Marwa in the air with him. In the late 19th Century, it inspired a Frenchman, Pierre-Louis Maillard, to closely observe the birds in Cairo. Maillard became known as "Majnoun al Faransy" (lit. "The Mad Man of France").
