= Marwa Hassan =

Egyptian runner

- مروة حسن
- Born: 2004 (age 21–22); Khor el-Mahmoudia, Aswan
- Occupation: Runner
- Years active: 2018 – present
- Known for: Long-distance running

Marwa Hassan (Arabic: مروة حسن) is an Egyptian runner.

As a child, Hassan was kept back from school by her stepmother and was made to sell packs of tissues on the street. She was illiterate and had no cell phone or spare clothing. In February 2018, at the age of 13, she observed a crowd on the street and was told it was a road race for the Aswan Heart Centre. The race offered the marathon, half marathon, and 10K run for adults and a separate 1 kilometre run for children. Although she lacked running clothes or shoes, she asked to enter the children's 1 km race. The race organizers allowed her to participate without paying the entrance fee, barefoot and wearing a long robe, and she unexpectedly won the race. She won a medal, a bottle of cooking oil, and a free cruise on the Nile with lunch included.

She received acclaim from British ambassador John Casson and the Egyptian Olympic Committee. She was made a member of the Egyptian Athletic Federation and Tala'ea El Gaish SC. However, she had to return to selling tissues on the street for a time, as her father is a gig worker with minimal income, her athletic training was suspended during the COVID-19 pandemic, and their house was lost in a 2021 flood. She did manage to become the only one in her family to attend school. In early 2022, she entered her first race as a professional runner, sponsored by Tala'ea El Gaish SC, and again won first place. In 2023 she was completing her schoolwork and aimed to become a veterinarian.
