= Marwa Thermal Power Plant =

Building in Chhattisgarh, India

The Marwa Tendubhata Thermal Power Station (by BHEL), is a coal-fired power station near Marwa village in Janjgir–Champa district, Chhattisgarh, India. The power station is owned by Chhattisgarh State Power Generation Company, state-owned generation utility.

There are two renowned schools in the proximity of the Power plant, named as Hasdeo Public School;& Delhi Public School.

== Capacity ==
The planned capacity of the power plant in 1000 MW (2x500 MW).

Unit Number	Capacity (MW)	Status	Date of Commissioning
1	500	Commissioned	Mar-2016
2	500	Commissioned	July-2016
