= Marfa Sharoiko =

Soviet-Belarusian Politician

Marfa Dmitrievna Sharoiko (1898-1978) was a Communist Soviet-Belarusian politician .

She served as Minister of Food and Dairy Industry.

She held the positions of deputy people's commissar of the meat and dairy industry of the Belarusian SSR, was the acting chairman of the Executive Committee of the Baranovitsky Regional Council, people's commissar.
