= Merve İzbilir =

Turkish volleyball player (born 1997)

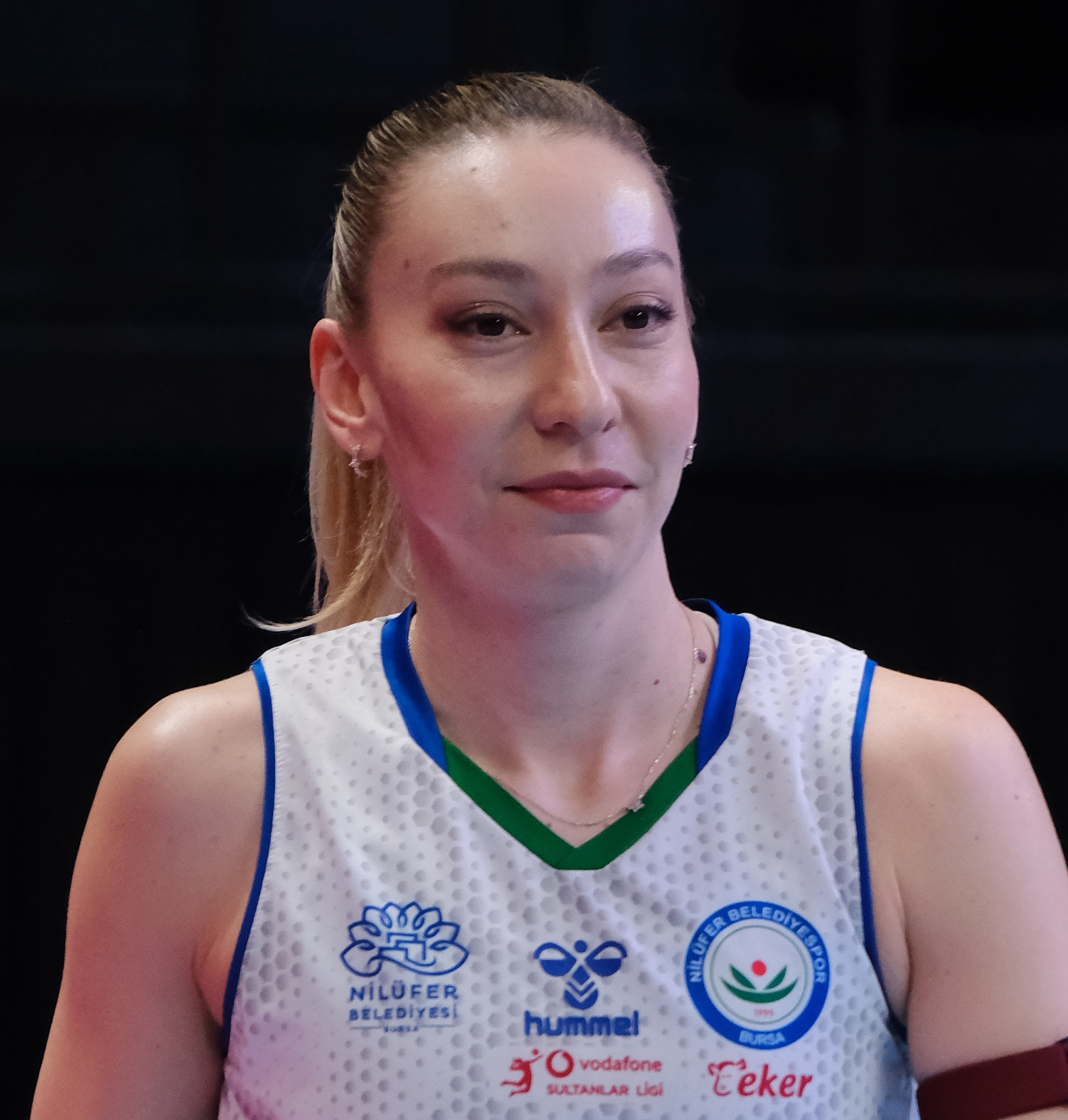
- Merve İzbilir of Nilüfer Bld. (2026)

Personal information
- Nationality: Turkish
- Born: 1 December 1997 (age 28); Turkey
- Height: 174 cm (5 ft 9 in)
- Weight: 60 kg (132 lb)
- Spike: 300
- Block: 253

Volleyball information
- Position: Libero
- Current club: Nilüfer Bld.
- Number: 3

Career
Years
- 2013–2016
- 2016–2017
- 2017–2018
- 2018–2019
- 2019–2020
- 2020–2021
- 2020–2021
- 2021–2022
- 2021–2024
- 2024–2025
- 2025–
Teams
- Salihli Bld.
- Alaşehir Bld.
- Salihli Bld.
- Büyükçekmece Voleybol Akademisi
- Nevşehir Bld.
- Edremit Bld. Altınoluk
- Sigorta Shop Kalecik Bld.
- Muratpaşa Bld.
- Muratpaşa Bld. Sigorto Shop
- Bahçelievler Bld.
- Nilüfer Bld.

National team
2026–	Turkey
Honours
Women's volleyball
Representing Turkey

Merve İzbilir (born 1 December 1997) is a Turkish volleyball player. She plays in the Turkish Women's Volleyball League for Nilüfer Bld. as libero. She is part of the Turkey women's national volleyball team.

== Club career ==
İzbilir started volleyball playing at the age of nine entering in Altınyıldız. She then played for Koç Spor and Silivrispor. In 2013, she joined the Manisa-based club Salihli Bld., where she played three seasons. She was instrumental for her team's champions title in the Turkish Women's Volleyball Second League, and so its promotion to the First League. After playing one season for Alaşehir Bld. in the same province, she returned to her former club Salihli Bld in May 2017. After playing for Büyükçekmece Voleybol Akademisi in Istanbul, she transferred in August 2019 to Nevşehir Bld., which was newly promoted to the First League. In the 2020–21 season, she joined the First League-club Edremit Bld Altınoluk in Balıkesir. In May 2023, she renewed her contract with the topflight Sultans League-club SigortaShop, after playing for Sigorta Shop Kalecik Bld. and Muratpaşa Bld. In May 2024, she signed a deal with Bahçelievker Bld. for the 2024–25 season. For the 2025–26 Turkish Women's Volleyball League season, she transferred to the Bursa-based club Nilüfer Bld.. In February 2026, she extended her contract with the club for the next season.

== International career ==
İzbilir was included in the Turkey women's national volleyball team to participate at the 2026 FIVB Women's Volleyball Nations League.

== Club ==
Turkish Women's Volleyball First League
(gold) /1(: 2020–21 (Sigorta Shop)

Republic Cup
(gold) (1): 2024–25 (Bahçelievler Bld.)
