= Marwah =

Marwah may refer to:

- Al-Safa and Al-Marwah, hills in Saudi Arabia
- Marwah valley, a subdivision of Kishtwar district, Jammu and Kashmir, India
- Moriah, the mount where Abraham went to sacrifice his son
- Ved Marwah (born 1932), Indian politician

== See also ==
- Marwa (disambiguation)
- Marva (disambiguation)
- Marwaha, an Indian surname
