= Mafra =

Mafra may refer to:

== Places ==
Brazil

- Mafra, Santa Catarina, a municipality in the State of Santa Catarina

Portugal

- Mafra, Portugal, town and municipality in the district of Lisbon
- Mafra National Palace, a palace/monastery located in Mafra

== Organisations ==
- Mafra (company), a Czech media group
- the Korean Ministry of Agriculture, Food and Rural Affairs (South Korea) (농림축산식품부)
- C.D. Mafra, Portuguese football club

== See also ==
- Maffra, Victoria
- Maphra
