= January 15 =

January 15 this year in various calendars
- Thursday, 15 January 2026
Other calendars
Armenian	29 Arach 1475
Aztec	Toxcatl 5, 6 Ācatl
Babylonian	25 Kislimu, 2336 SE
Balinese pawukon	Luang, Pepet, Beteng, Sri, Paing, Was, Wraspati of Tambir, Sri, Jangur, Raja
Bengali	7 Bhadro, BS 1433
Chinese	Yin Earth Ox・Dipper Mansion; 175 Liùyuè, Yǐsìnián (Xiaohan, 5 days until Dahan)
Common Era	15 January 2026 CE
Coptic	7 Tobi, AM 1742
Egyptian	4 Payni, 2774 NE
Ethiopian	7 Ṭer, 2018 Amätä Məhrät
French Republican	Décade III, Sextidi de Nivôse de l'Année 234 de la République
Gregorian	15 January, AD 2026
Hebrew	26 Tevet, AM 5786
Icelandic	Fimmtudagur, 23 Mörsugur 2025
Islamic	26 Rajab, AH 1447 (using tabular method)
ISO week date	2026-W03-4
Japanese	27 Shimotsuki, Reiwa 8 (Shōkan, 5 days until Daikan)
Julian	2 January, AD 2026 (AM 7534)
Julian day	2461056
Maya	13.0.13.4.13; 11 Muan, 6 Ben
Roman	ante diem IV Nonas Ianuarias, MMDCCLXXIX AUC
Solar Hijri	25 Dey, SH 1404

<<	January					>>
Su	Mo	Tu	We	Th	Fr	Sa
				1	2	3
4	5	6	7	8	9	10
11	12	13	14	15	16	17
18	19	20	21	22	23	24
25	26	27	28	29	30	31
2026

January 15 in recent years
2026 (Thursday)
2025 (Wednesday)
2024 (Monday)
2023 (Sunday)
2022 (Saturday)
2021 (Friday)
2020 (Wednesday)
2019 (Tuesday)
2018 (Monday)
2017 (Sunday)

January 15 is the 15th day of the year in the Gregorian calendar; 350 days remain until the end of the year (351 in leap years).

== Events ==
=== Pre-1600 ===
- 69 – Otho seizes power in Rome, proclaiming himself Emperor of Rome, beginning a reign of only three months.
- 1535 – King Henry VIII issues letters patent incorporating the title Supreme Head of the Church of England into his royal title.
- 1541 – King Francis I of France gives Jean-François Roberval a commission to settle the province of New France (Canada) and provide for the spread of the "Holy Catholic faith".
- 1559 – Elizabeth I is crowned Queen of England and Ireland in Westminster Abbey, London.
- 1582 – Truce of Yam-Zapolsky: Russia cedes Livonia to the Polish–Lithuanian Commonwealth.

=== 1601–1900 ===
- 1759 – The British Museum opens to the public.
- 1777 – American Revolutionary War: New Connecticut (present-day Vermont) declares its independence.
- 1782 – Superintendent of Finance Robert Morris addresses the U.S. Congress to recommend establishment of a national mint and decimal coinage.
- 1815 – War of 1812: American frigate USS President, commanded by Commodore Stephen Decatur, is captured by a squadron of four British frigates.
- 1818 – A paper by David Brewster is read to the Royal Society, belatedly announcing his discovery of what we now call the biaxial class of doubly-refracting crystals. On the same day, Augustin-Jean Fresnel signs a "supplement" (submitted four days later) on reflection of polarized light.
- 1822 – Greek War of Independence: Demetrios Ypsilantis is elected president of the legislative assembly.
- 1865 – American Civil War: Fort Fisher in North Carolina falls to the Union, thus cutting off the last major seaport of the Confederacy.
- 1867 – Forty people die when ice covering the boating lake at Regent's Park, London, collapses.
- 1870 – Thomas Nast publishes a political cartoon symbolizing the Democratic Party with a donkey ("A Live Jackass Kicking a Dead Lion") for Harper's Weekly.
- 1876 – The first newspaper in Afrikaans, Die Afrikaanse Patriot, is published in Paarl.
- 1889 – The Coca-Cola Company, then known as the Pemberton Medicine Company, is incorporated in Atlanta.
- 1892 – James Naismith publishes the rules of basketball.

=== 1901–present ===
- 1908 – The Alpha Kappa Alpha sorority becomes the first Greek-letter organization founded and established by African American college women.
- 1910 – Construction ends on the Buffalo Bill Dam in Wyoming, United States, which was the highest dam in the world at the time, at 99 m (325 ft).
- 1911 – Palestinian Arabic-language Falastin newspaper founded.
- 1919 – Rosa Luxemburg and Karl Liebknecht, two of the most prominent communists in Germany, are clubbed and then shot to death by members of the Freikorps at the end of the Spartacist uprising.
- 1919 – Great Molasses Flood: A wave of molasses released from an exploding storage tank sweeps through Boston, Massachusetts, killing 21 and injuring 150.
- 1934 – The 8.0 M_{w} Nepal–Bihar earthquake strikes Nepal and Bihar with a maximum Mercalli intensity of XI (Extreme), killing an estimated 6,000–10,700 people.
- 1936 – The first building to be completely covered in glass, built for the Owens-Illinois Glass Company, is completed in Toledo, Ohio.
- 1937 – Spanish Civil War: Nationalists and Republicans both withdraw after suffering heavy losses, ending the Second Battle of the Corunna Road.
- 1943 – World War II: The Soviet counter-offensive at Voronezh begins.
- 1943 – The Pentagon is dedicated in Arlington County, Virginia.
- 1947 – The Black Dahlia murder: The dismembered corpse of Elizabeth Short is found in Los Angeles.
- 1949 – Chinese Civil War: The Communist forces take over Tianjin from the Nationalist government.
- 1962 – The Derveni papyrus, Europe's oldest surviving manuscript dating to 340 BC, is found in northern Greece.
- 1962 – Netherlands New Guinea Conflict: Indonesian Navy fast patrol boat RI Macan Tutul commanded by Commodore Yos Sudarso sunk in Arafura Sea by the Dutch Navy.
- 1966 – The First Nigerian Republic, led by Abubakar Tafawa Balewa is overthrown in a military coup d'état.
- 1967 – The first Super Bowl is played in Los Angeles. The Green Bay Packers defeat the Kansas City Chiefs 35–10.
- 1969 – The Soviet Union launches Soyuz 5.
- 1970 – Nigerian Civil War: Biafran rebels surrender following an unsuccessful 32-month fight for independence from Nigeria.
- 1970 – Muammar Gaddafi is proclaimed premier of Libya.
- 1973 – Vietnam War: Citing progress in peace negotiations, President Richard Nixon announces the suspension of offensive action in North Vietnam.
- 1975 – The Alvor Agreement is signed, ending the Angolan War of Independence and giving Angola independence from Portugal.
- 1976 – Gerald Ford's would-be assassin, Sara Jane Moore, is sentenced to life in prison.
- 1977 – Linjeflyg Flight 618 crashes in Kälvesta near Stockholm Bromma Airport in Stockholm, Sweden, killing 22 people.
- 1981 – Pope John Paul II receives a delegation from the Polish trade union Solidarity at the Vatican led by Lech Wałęsa.
- 1991 – The United Nations deadline for the withdrawal of Iraqi forces from occupied Kuwait expires, preparing the way for the start of Operation Desert Storm.
- 1991 – Elizabeth II, in her capacity as Queen of Australia, signs letters patent allowing Australia to become the first Commonwealth realm to institute its own Victoria Cross in its honours system.
- 2001 – Wikipedia, a free wiki content encyclopedia, is launched (Wikipedia Day).
- 2005 – ESA's SMART-1 lunar orbiter discovers elements such as calcium, aluminum, silicon, iron, and other surface elements on the Moon.
- 2009 – US Airways Flight 1549 ditches safely in the Hudson River after the plane collides with birds less than two minutes after take-off. This becomes known as "The Miracle on the Hudson" as all 155 people on board were rescued.
- 2013 – A train carrying Egyptian Army recruits derails near Giza, Greater Cairo, killing 19 and injuring 120 others.
- 2015 – The Swiss National Bank abandons the cap on the Swiss franc's value relative to the euro, causing turmoil in international financial markets.
- 2016 – The Kenyan Army suffers its worst defeat ever in a battle with Al-Shabaab Islamic insurgents in El-Adde, Somalia. An estimated 150 Kenyan soldiers are killed in the battle.
- 2018 – British multinational construction and facilities management services company Carillion goes into liquidation – officially, "the largest ever trading liquidation in the UK".
- 2019 – Somali militants attack the DusitD2 hotel in Nairobi, Kenya killing at least 21 people and injuring 19.
- 2019 – Theresa May's UK government suffers the biggest government defeat in modern times, when 432 MPs voting against the proposed European Union withdrawal agreement, giving her opponents a majority of 230.
- 2020 – The Japanese Ministry of Health, Labour and Welfare confirms the first case of COVID-19 in Japan.
- 2021 – A 6.2-magnitude earthquake strikes Indonesia's Sulawesi island killing at least 105 and injuring 3,369 people.
- 2022 – The Hunga Tonga-Hunga Haʻapai volcano erupts, cutting off communications with Tonga and causing a tsunami across the Pacific.
- 2023 – Yeti Airlines Flight 691 crashes near Pokhara International Airport, killing all 72 people on board.

== Births ==
=== Pre-1600 ===
- 1432 – Afonso V of Portugal (died 1481)
- 1462 – Edzard I, Count of East Frisia, German noble (died 1528)
- 1481 – Ashikaga Yoshizumi, Japanese shōgun (died 1511)
- 1538 – Maeda Toshiie, Japanese general (died 1599)
- 1595 – Henry Carey, 2nd Earl of Monmouth, English politician (died 1661)

=== 1601–1900 ===
- 1622 – Molière, French actor and playwright (died 1673)
- 1623 – Algernon Sidney, British philosopher (probable) (died 1683)
- 1671 – Abraham de la Pryme, English archaeologist and historian (died 1704)
- 1716 – Philip Livingston, American merchant and politician (died 1778)
- 1747 – John Aikin, English surgeon and author (died 1822)
- 1754 – Richard Martin, Irish activist and politician, co-founded the Royal Society for the Prevention of Cruelty to Animals (died 1834)
- 1791 – Franz Grillparzer, Austrian author, poet, and playwright (died 1872)
- 1795 – Alexander Griboyedov, Russian playwright, composer, and poet (died 1829)
- 1803 – Marjorie Fleming, Scottish poet and author (died 1811)
- 1809 – Pierre-Joseph Proudhon, French economist and politician (died 1865)
- 1815 – William Bickerton, English-American religious leader, third President of the Church of Jesus Christ (died 1905)
- 1834 – Samuel Arza Davenport, American lawyer and politician (died 1911)
- 1840 – Jo Abbott, American judge, politician and Confederate army officer (died 1908)
- 1841 – Frederick Stanley, 16th Earl of Derby, English captain and politician, sixth Governor General of Canada (died 1908)
- 1842 – Josef Breuer, Austrian physician and psychiatrist (died 1925)
- 1842 – Mary MacKillop, Australian nun and saint, co-founded the Sisters of St Joseph of the Sacred Heart (died 1909)
- 1850 – Leonard Darwin, English soldier, eugenicist, and politician (died 1943)
- 1850 – Mihai Eminescu, Romanian journalist, author, and poet (died 1889)
- 1850 – Sofia Kovalevskaya, Russian-Swedish mathematician and physicist (died 1891)
- 1855 – Jacques Damala, Greek-French soldier and actor (died 1889)
- 1858 – Giovanni Segantini, Italian painter (died 1899)
- 1859 – Archibald Peake, English-Australian politician, 25th Premier of South Australia (died 1920)
- 1863 – Wilhelm Marx, German lawyer and politician, 17th Chancellor of Germany (died 1946)
- 1866 – Nathan Söderblom, Swedish archbishop, historian, and academic, Nobel Prize laureate (died 1931)
- 1869 – Ruby Laffoon, American lawyer and politician, 43rd Governor of Kentucky (died 1941)
- 1869 – Stanisław Wyspiański, Polish poet, playwright, and painter (died 1907)
- 1870 – Pierre S. du Pont, American businessman and philanthropist (died 1954)
- 1872 – Arsen Kotsoyev, Russian author and translator (died 1944)
- 1875 – Thomas Burke, American sprinter, coach, and journalist (died 1929)
- 1877 – Lewis Terman, American psychologist, eugenicist, and academic (died 1956)
- 1878 – Johanna Müller-Hermann, Austrian composer (died 1941)
- 1879 – Mazo de la Roche, Canadian author and playwright (died 1961)
- 1879 – Ernest Thesiger, English actor (died 1961)
- 1882 – Henry Burr, Canadian singer, radio performer, and producer (died 1941)
- 1882 – Princess Margaret of Connaught (died 1920)
- 1885 – Lorenz Böhler, Austrian physician and author (died 1973)
- 1885 – Grover Lowdermilk, American baseball player (died 1968)
- 1890 – Michiaki Kamada, Japanese admiral (died 1947)
- 1891 – Ray Chapman, American baseball player (died 1920)
- 1893 – Rex Ingram, Irish film director, producer, writer, and actor (died 1950)
- 1893 – Ivor Novello, Welsh singer-songwriter and actor (died 1951)
- 1895 – Artturi Ilmari Virtanen, Finnish chemist and academic, Nobel Prize laureate (died 1973)
- 1896 – Marjorie Bennett, Australian-American actress (died 1982)

=== 1901–present ===
- 1902 – Nâzım Hikmet, Greek-Turkish author, poet, and playwright (died 1963)
- 1902 – Saud of Saudi Arabia (died 1969)
- 1903 – Paul A. Dever, American lieutenant and politician, 58th Governor of Massachusetts (died 1958)
- 1905 – Torin Thatcher, British actor (died 1981)
- 1907 – Janusz Kusociński, Polish runner and soldier (died 1940)
- 1908 – Edward Teller, Hungarian-American physicist and academic (died 2003)
- 1909 – Jean Bugatti, German-French engineer (died 1939)
- 1909 – Gene Krupa, American drummer, composer, and actor (died 1973)
- 1912 – Michel Debré, French lawyer and politician, Prime Minister of France (died 1996)
- 1913 – Eugène Brands, Dutch painter (died 2002)
- 1913 – Lloyd Bridges, American actor (died 1998)
- 1913 – Miriam Hyde, Australian pianist and composer (died 2005)
- 1913 – Alexander Marinesko, Ukrainian-Russian lieutenant (died 1963)
- 1914 – Stefan Bałuk, Polish general (died 2014)
- 1914 – Hugh Trevor-Roper, English historian and academic (died 2003)
- 1917 – K. A. Thangavelu, Indian film actor and comedian (died 1994)
- 1918 – João Figueiredo, Brazilian general and politician, 30th President of Brazil (died 1999)
- 1918 – Édouard Gagnon, Canadian cardinal (died 2007)
- 1918 – Gamal Abdel Nasser, Egyptian colonel and politician, second President of Egypt (died 1970)
- 1919 – Maurice Herzog, French mountaineer and politician, French Minister of Youth Affairs and Sports (died 2012)
- 1919 – George Cadle Price, Belizean politician, first Prime Minister of Belize (died 2011)
- 1920 – Bob Davies, American basketball player and coach (died 1990)
- 1920 – Steve Gromek, American baseball player (died 2002)
- 1920 – John O'Connor, American cardinal (died 2000)
- 1921 – Cliff Barker, American basketball player (died 1998)
- 1921 – Babasaheb Bhosale, Indian lawyer and politician, eighth Chief Minister of Maharashtra (died 2007)
- 1921 – Frank Thornton, English actor (died 2013)
- 1922 – Sylvia Lawler, English geneticist (died 1996)
- 1922 – Eric Willis, Australian sergeant and politician, 34th Premier of New South Wales (died 1999)
- 1923 – Ivor Cutler, Scottish pianist, songwriter, and poet (died 2006)
- 1923 – Lee Teng-hui, Taiwanese economist and politician, fourth President of the Republic of China (died 2020)
- 1924 – George Lowe, New Zealand-English mountaineer and explorer (died 2013)
- 1925 – Ruth Slenczynska, American pianist and composer (died 2026)
- 1925 – Ignacio López Tarso, Mexican actor (died 2023)
- 1926 – Maria Schell, Austrian-Swiss actress (died 2005)
- 1927 – Phyllis Coates, American actress (died 2023)
- 1928 – Joanne Linville, American actress (died 2021)
- 1928 – W. R. Mitchell, English journalist and author (died 2015)
- 1929 – Earl Hooker, American guitarist (died 1970)
- 1929 – Martin Luther King Jr., American minister and activist, Nobel Prize laureate (died 1968)
- 1930 – Eddie Graham, American professional wrestler and promoter (died 1985)
- 1931 – Lee Bontecou, American painter and sculptor (died 2022)
- 1931 – Derek Meddings, British special effects designer (died 1995)
- 1932 – Lou Jones, American sprinter (died 2006)
- 1933 – Frank Bough, English journalist and radio host (died 2020)
- 1933 – Ernest J. Gaines, American author and academic (died 2019)
- 1933 – Peter Maitlis, English chemist and academic (died 2022)
- 1934 – V. S. Ramadevi, Indian civil servant and politician, 13th Governor of Karnataka (died 2013)
- 1935 – Robert Silverberg, American author and editor
- 1936 – Richard Franklin, English actor, writer, director and political activist (died 2023)
- 1937 – Margaret O'Brien, American actress and singer
- 1938 – Ashraf Aman, Pakistani engineer and mountaineer
- 1938 – Estrella Blanca, Mexican wrestler (died 2021)
- 1938 – Chuni Goswami, Indian footballer and cricketer (died 2020)
- 1939 – Per Ahlmark, Swedish journalist and politician, first Deputy Prime Minister of Sweden (died 2018)
- 1939 – Tony Bullimore, English sailor (died 2018)
- 1941 – Captain Beefheart, American singer-songwriter, musician, and artist (died 2010)
- 1942 – Frank Joseph Polozola, American academic and judge (died 2013)
- 1943 – George Ambrum, Australian rugby league player (died 1986)
- 1943 – Margaret Beckett, English metallurgist and politician, Secretary of State for Foreign and Commonwealth Affairs
- 1943 – Stuart E. Eizenstat, American lawyer and diplomat, United States Ambassador to the European Union
- 1943 – Mike Marshall, American baseball player (died 2021)
- 1944 – Jenny Nimmo, English author
- 1945 – Ko Chun-hsiung, Taiwanese actor, director, and politician (died 2015)
- 1945 – Vince Foster, American lawyer and political figure (died 1993)
- 1945 – William R. Higgins, American colonel (died 1990)
- 1945 – Princess Michael of Kent
- 1945 – David Pleat, English footballer, manager, and sportscaster
- 1946 – Charles Brown, American actor (died 2004)
- 1947 – Mary Hogg, English lawyer and judge
- 1947 – Andrea Martin, American-Canadian actress, singer, and screenwriter
- 1948 – Ronnie Van Zant, American singer-songwriter (died 1977)
- 1949 – Luis Alvarado, Puerto Rican-American baseball player (died 2001)
- 1949 – Alasdair Liddell, English businessman (died 2012)
- 1949 – Ian Stewart, Scottish runner
- 1949 – Howard Twitty, American golfer
- 1950 – Marius Trésor, French footballer and coach
- 1951 – Ernie DiGregorio, American basketball player
- 1952 – Boris Blank, Swiss singer-songwriter
- 1952 – Andrzej Fischer, Polish footballer (died 2018)
- 1952 – Muhammad Wakkas, Bangladeshi teacher and parliamentarian (died 2021)
- 1953 – Randy White, American football player
- 1954 – Jose Dalisay, Jr., Filipino poet, author, and screenwriter
- 1955 – Nigel Benson, English author and illustrator
- 1955 – Andreas Gursky, German photographer
- 1955 – Khalid Islambouli, Egyptian lieutenant (died 1982)
- 1956 – Vitaly Kaloyev, Russian architect
- 1956 – Mayawati, Indian educator and politician, 23rd Chief Minister of Uttar Pradesh
- 1956 – Marc Trestman, American football player and coach
- 1957 – David Ige, American politician
- 1957 – Marty Lyons, American football player and sportscaster
- 1957 – Andrew Tyrie, English journalist and politician
- 1957 – Mario Van Peebles, Mexican-American actor and director
- 1958 – Ken Judge, Australian footballer and coach (died 2016)
- 1958 – Boris Tadić, Serbian psychologist and politician, 16th President of Serbia
- 1959 – Greg Dowling, Australian rugby league player
- 1959 – Pavle Kozjek, Slovenian mountaineer and photographer (died 2008)
- 1961 – Serhiy N. Morozov, Ukrainian footballer and coach
- 1961 – Yves Pelletier, Canadian actor and director
- 1963 – Craig Fairbrass, English actor, producer, and screenwriter
- 1964 – Osmo Tapio Räihälä, Finnish composer
- 1965 – Maurizio Fondriest, Italian cyclist
- 1965 – Bernard Hopkins, American boxer and coach
- 1965 – Adam Jones, American musician and songwriter
- 1965 – James Nesbitt, Northern Irish actor
- 1967 – Ted Tryba, American golfer
- 1968 – Chad Lowe, American actor, director, and producer
- 1969 – Delino DeShields, American baseball player and manager
- 1970 – Michele Granger, American softball player
- 1970 – Shane McMahon, American wrestler and businessman
- 1971 – Regina King, American actress
- 1972 – Shelia Burrell, American heptathlete
- 1972 – Christos Kostis, Greek footballer
- 1972 – Claudia Winkleman, English journalist and critic
- 1973 – Essam El Hadary, Egyptian footballer
- 1974 – Séverine Deneulin, international development academic
- 1975 – Mary Pierce, Canadian-American tennis player and coach
- 1975 – Martin Štrbák, Slovak ice hockey player
- 1976 – Doug Gottlieb, American basketball player and sportscaster
- 1976 – Alexander Korolyuk, Russian ice hockey player
- 1976 – Iryna Lishchynska, Ukrainian runner
- 1976 – Dorian Missick, American actor
- 1976 – Scott Murray, Scottish rugby player
- 1976 – Florentin Petre, Romanian footballer and manager
- 1978 – Eddie Cahill, American actor
- 1978 – Franco Pellizotti, Italian cyclist
- 1978 – Ryan Sidebottom, English cricketer
- 1979 – Drew Brees, American football player
- 1979 – Michalis Morfis, Cypriot footballer
- 1979 – Martin Petrov, Bulgarian footballer
- 1980 – Matt Holliday, American baseball player
- 1981 – Dylan Armstrong, Canadian shot putter and hammer thrower
- 1981 – Vanessa Henke, German tennis player
- 1981 – Pitbull, American rapper and producer
- 1981 – El Hadji Diouf, Senegalese footballer
- 1982 – Armando Galarraga, Venezuelan baseball player
- 1982 – Francis Zé, Cameroonian footballer
- 1983 – Hugo Viana, Portuguese footballer
- 1983 – Jermaine Pennant, English footballer
- 1984 – Ben Shapiro, American author and commentator
- 1984 – Victor Rasuk, American actor
- 1985 – René Adler, German footballer
- 1985 – Kenneth Emil Petersen, Danish footballer
- 1985 – Pavel Podkolzin, Russian basketball player
- 1986 – Jessy Schram, American actress and model
- 1987 – Greg Inglis, Australian rugby league player
- 1987 – Tsegaye Kebede, Ethiopian runner
- 1987 – Kelly Kelly, American wrestler and model
- 1987 – David Knight, English footballer
- 1987 – Kelleigh Ryan, Canadian fencer
- 1988 – Daniel Caligiuri, German footballer
- 1988 – Skrillex, American DJ and producer
- 1988 – Donald Sloan, American basketball player
- 1988 – Jun. K, South Korean singer
- 1989 – Alexei Cherepanov, Russian ice hockey player (died 2008)
- 1989 – Nicole Ross, American Olympic foil fencer
- 1989 – Martin Dúbravka, Slovak footballer
- 1990 – Sidney Franklin, American actor and tap dancer
- 1990 – Robert Trznadel, Polish footballer
- 1990 – Slava Voynov, Russian ice hockey player
- 1990 – Chris Warren, American actor
- 1991 – Marc Bartra, Spanish footballer
- 1991 – Matt Duffy, American baseball player
- 1991 – Mitch Garver, American baseball player
- 1991 – Nicolai Jørgensen, Danish footballer
- 1991 – Darya Klishina, Russian long jumper
- 1991 – James Mitchell, Australian basketball player
- 1992 – Joël Veltman, Dutch footballer
- 1992 – Joshua King, Norwegian footballer
- 1993 – Kadeem Allen, American basketball player
- 1994 – Eric Dier, English footballer
- 1996 – Dove Cameron, American actress and singer
- 1996 – Deebo Samuel, American football player
- 1998 – Alexandra Eade, Australian artistic gymnast
- 1998 – Ben Godfrey, English footballer
- 1998 – Chloe Kelly, English footballer
- 2000 – Triston Casas, American baseball player
- 2002 – Tim Stützle, German ice hockey player
- 2004 – Grace VanderWaal, American singer-songwriter

== Deaths ==
=== Pre-1600 ===
- 69 – Galba, Roman emperor (born 3 BC)
- 378 – Chak Tok Ich'aak I, Mayan ruler
- 570 – Íte of Killeedy, Irish nun and saint (born 475)
- 849 – Theophylact, Byzantine emperor (born 793)
- 936 – Rudolph of France (born 880)
- 950 – Wang Jingchong, Chinese general
- 1149 – Berengaria of Barcelona, queen consort of Castile (born 1116)
- 1477 – Adriana of Nassau-Siegen, German countess (born 1449)
- 1568 – Nicolaus Olahus, Romanian archbishop (born 1493)
- 1569 – Catherine Carey, lady-in-waiting to Elizabeth I of England (born 1524)
- 1584 – Martha Leijonhufvud, Swedish noblewoman (born 1520)

=== 1601–1900 ===
- 1623 – Paolo Sarpi, Italian lawyer, historian, and scholar (born 1552)
- 1672 – John Cosin, English bishop and academic (born 1594)
- 1683 – Philip Warwick, English politician (born 1609)
- 1775 – Giovanni Battista Sammartini, Italian organist and composer (born 1700)
- 1783 – Lord Stirling, American Revolutionary War Major General (born 1726)
- 1790 – John Landen, English mathematician and theorist (born 1719)
- 1804 – Dru Drury, English entomologist and author (born 1725)
- 1813 – Anton Bernolák, Slovak linguist and priest (born 1762)
- 1815 – Emma, Lady Hamilton, English-French mistress of Horatio Nelson, 1st Viscount Nelson (born 1761)
- 1854 – Jiang Zhongyuan, Chinese scholar and soldier (born 1812)
- 1855 – Henri Braconnot, French chemist and pharmacist (born 1780)
- 1864 – Isaac Nathan, English-Australian composer and journalist (born 1792)
- 1866 – Massimo d'Azeglio, Piedmontese-Italian statesman, novelist and painter (born 1798)
- 1876 – Eliza McCardle Johnson, American wife of Andrew Johnson, 18th First Lady of the United States (born 1810)
- 1880 – Carl Georg von Wächter, German jurist (born 1797)
- 1893 – Fanny Kemble, English actress (born 1809)
- 1896 – Mathew Brady, American photographer and journalist (born 1822)

=== 1901–present ===
- 1905 – George Thorn, Australian politician, sixth Premier of Queensland (born 1838)
- 1909 – Arnold Janssen, German priest and missionary (born 1837)
- 1916 – Modest Ilyich Tchaikovsky, Russian playwright and translator (born 1850)
- 1919 – Karl Liebknecht, German politician (born 1871)
- 1919 – Rosa Luxemburg, German economist, theorist, and philosopher (born 1871)
- 1926 – Enrico Toselli, Italian pianist and composer (born 1883)
- 1929 – George Cope, American painter (born 1855)
- 1936 – Henry Forster, 1st Baron Forster, English cricketer and politician, seventh Governor-General of Australia (born 1866)
- 1937 – Anton Holban, Romanian author, theoretician, and educator (born 1902)
- 1939 – Kullervo Manner, Finnish Speaker of the Parliament, the Prime Minister of the FSWR and the Supreme Commander of the Red Guards (born 1880)
- 1945 – Wilhelm Wirtinger, Austrian-German mathematician and theorist (born 1865)
- 1948 – Josephus Daniels, American publisher and diplomat, 41st United States Secretary of the Navy (born 1862)
- 1950 – Henry H. Arnold, American general (born 1886)
- 1951 – Ernest Swinton, British Army officer (born 1868)
- 1951 – Nikolai Vekšin, Estonian-Russian captain and sailor (born 1887)
- 1952 – Ned Hanlon, Australian sergeant and politician, 26th Premier of Queensland (born 1887)
- 1955 – Yves Tanguy, French-American painter (born 1900)
- 1959 – Regina Margareten, Hungarian businesswoman (born 1863)
- 1962 – Yos Sudarso, Indonesian naval officer (born 1925)
- 1964 – Jack Teagarden, American singer-songwriter and trombonist (born 1905)
- 1967 – David Burliuk, Ukrainian author and illustrator (born 1882)
- 1968 – Bill Masterton, Canadian-American ice hockey player (born 1938)
- 1970 – Frank Clement, English race car driver (born 1886)
- 1970 – William T. Piper, American engineer and businessman, founded Piper Aircraft (born 1881)
- 1972 – Daisy Ashford, English author (born 1881)
- 1973 – Coleman Francis, American actor, director, and producer (born 1919)
- 1973 – Ivan Petrovsky, Russian mathematician and academic (born 1901)
- 1974 – Harold D. Cooley, American lawyer and politician (born 1897)
- 1981 – Graham Whitehead, English race car driver (born 1922)
- 1982 – Red Smith, American journalist (born 1905)
- 1983 – Armin Öpik, Estonian-Australian paleontologist and geologist (born 1898)
- 1983 – Shepperd Strudwick, American actor (born 1907)
- 1984 – Fazıl Küçük, Cypriot journalist and politician (born 1906)
- 1987 – Ray Bolger, American actor, singer, and dancer (born 1904)
- 1988 – Seán MacBride, Irish republican activist and politician, Minister for External Affairs, Nobel Prize laureate (born 1904)
- 1990 – Gordon Jackson, Scottish-English actor (born 1923)
- 1990 – Peggy van Praagh, English ballerina, choreographer, and director (born 1910)
- 1993 – Sammy Cahn, American songwriter (born 1913)
- 1994 – Georges Cziffra, Hungarian-French pianist and composer (born 1921)
- 1994 – Harry Nilsson, American singer-songwriter (born 1941)
- 1994 – Harilal Upadhyay, Indian author, poet, and astrologist (born 1916)
- 1996 – Les Baxter, American pianist and composer (born 1922)
- 1996 – Moshoeshoe II of Lesotho (born 1938)
- 1998 – Gulzarilal Nanda, Indian economist and politician, Prime Minister of India (born 1898)
- 1998 – Junior Wells, American singer-songwriter and harmonica player (born 1934)
- 1999 – Betty Box, English film producer (born 1915)
- 2000 – Georges-Henri Lévesque, Canadian-Dominican priest and sociologist (born 1903)
- 2001 – Leo Marks, English cryptographer, playwright, and screenwriter (born 1920)
- 2002 – Michael Anthony Bilandic, American politician, 49th Mayor of Chicago (born 1923)
- 2002 – Eugène Brands, Dutch painter (born 1913)
- 2002 – Jeanne Voltz, American food journalist and cookbook writer (born 1920)
- 2003 – Doris Fisher, American singer-songwriter (born 1915)
- 2004 – Olivia Goldsmith, American author (born 1949)
- 2005 – Victoria de los Ángeles, Spanish soprano and actress (born 1923)
- 2005 – Walter Ernsting, German author (born 1920)
- 2005 – Elizabeth Janeway, American author and critic (born 1913)
- 2005 – Ruth Warrick, American actress (born 1916)
- 2006 – Jaber Al-Ahmad Al-Jaber Al-Sabah, Kuwaiti ruler (born 1926)
- 2007 – Awad Hamed al-Bandar, Iraqi lawyer and judge (born 1945)
- 2007 – Barzan Ibrahim al-Tikriti, Iraqi intelligence officer (born 1951)
- 2007 – James Hillier, Canadian-American computer scientist and academic, co-invented the electron microscope (born 1915)
- 2007 – Pura Santillan-Castrence, Filipino educator and diplomat (born 1905)
- 2007 – Bo Yibo, Chinese commander and politician, Vice Premier of the People's Republic of China (born 1908)
- 2008 – Robert V. Bruce, American historian, author, and academic (born 1923)
- 2008 – Brad Renfro, American actor (born 1982)
- 2009 – Lincoln Verduga Loor, Ecuadorian journalist and politician (born 1917)
- 2011 – Nat Lofthouse, English footballer and manager (born 1925)
- 2011 – Pierre Louis-Dreyfus, French soldier, race car driver, and businessman (born 1908)
- 2011 – Susannah York, English actress and activist (born 1939)
- 2012 – Ed Derwinski, American soldier and politician, first United States Secretary of Veterans Affairs (born 1926)
- 2012 – Manuel Fraga Iribarne, Spanish lawyer and politician, third President of the Xunta of Galicia (born 1922)
- 2012 – Carlo Fruttero, Italian journalist and author (born 1926)
- 2012 – Samuel Jaskilka, American general (born 1919)
- 2012 – Ib Spang Olsen, Danish author and illustrator (born 1921)
- 2012 – Hulett C. Smith, American lieutenant and politician, 27th Governor of West Virginia (born 1918)
- 2013 – Nagisa Oshima, Japanese director and screenwriter (born 1932)
- 2013 – John Thomas, American high jumper (born 1941)
- 2014 – Curtis Bray, American football player and coach (born 1970)
- 2014 – John Dobson, Chinese-American astronomer and author (born 1915)
- 2014 – Roger Lloyd-Pack, English actor (born 1944)
- 2015 – Ervin Drake, American songwriter and composer (born 1919)
- 2015 – Kim Fowley, American singer-songwriter, producer, and manager (born 1939)
- 2015 – Ray Nagel, American football player and coach (born 1927)
- 2016 – Francisco X. Alarcón, American poet and educator (born 1954)
- 2016 – Ken Judge, Australian footballer and coach (born 1958)
- 2016 – Manuel Velázquez, Spanish footballer (born 1943)
- 2017 – Jimmy Snuka, Fijian professional wrestler (born 1943)
- 2018 – Dolores O'Riordan, Irish pop singer (born 1971)
- 2019 – Carol Channing, American actress (born 1921)
- 2019 – Ida Kleijnen, Dutch chef (born 1936)
- 2020 – Rocky Johnson, Canadian professional wrestler (born 1944)
- 2020 – Lloyd Cowan, British athlete and coach (born 1962)
- 2022 – Alexa McDonough, first female politician to lead a major provincial political party in Canada, former leader of the federal New Democratic Party. (born 1944)
- 2025 – Paul Danan, English actor and television personality (born 1978)
- 2025 – David Lynch, American television and film director, visual artist and musician, complications from emphysema (born 1946)
- 2025 – Melba Montgomery, American country music singer-songwriter (born 1938)
- 2025 – Linda Nolan, Irish singer and actress (born 1959)

== Holidays and observances ==
- Arbor Day (Egypt)
- Armed Forces Remembrance Day (Nigeria)
- Army Day (India)
- Christian feast day:
  - Abeluzius (Ethiopian Orthodox Tewahedo Church)
  - Arnold Janssen
  - Francis Ferdinand de Capillas (one of Martyr Saints of China)
  - Ita
  - Our Lady of the Poor
  - Macarius of Egypt (Western Christianity)
  - Maurus and Placidus (Order of Saint Benedict)
  - Paul the Hermit
  - January 15 (Eastern Orthodox liturgics)
- John Chilembwe Day (Malawi)
- Korean Alphabet Day (North Korea)
- Ocean Duty Day (Indonesia)
- Teacher's Day (Venezuela)
