= Abeluzius =

- Born: Unknown
- Died: Unknown
- Cause of death: Unknown
- Feast: January 15
- Tradition or genre: feast day

Abeluzius is a saint of the Ethiopian Orthodox Tewahedo Church. He is commemorated with a feast day of January 15. Little else is known of the person. It has been speculated that the name may be a typographical error for "Abba Lucius", a Syro-Roman name.

== Sources ==
- Holweck, F. G. A Biographical Dictionary of the Saints. St. Louis, Missouri, US: B. Herder Book Co., 1924.
