= Murder of Shahzad Luqman =

2013 murder in Greece

Shehzad Luqman was a 27-year-old man of Pakistani origin who was murdered by members of Golden Dawn in the early hours of 17 January 2013 in Petralona, Athens.

== Trial ==
29-year-old firefighter Christos Stergiopoulos and 25-year-old Dionysis Liakopoulos were accused of the murder. They were accused of attacking and killing Luqman with folding knives while he was cycling to work delivering oranges.

Three butterfly daggers, an iron knuckle, a knife, a wooden club, a hunting rifle, cartridges, and 117 campaign leaflets, stickers and other materials of Golden Dawn were found in Liakopoulos' house, while a wooden bat, casings and a black blade were found at Stergiopoulos' residence.

In the first trial that began on 18 December 2013 and ended on 15 April 2014, they were sentenced by the Athens Criminal Court to life imprisonment without parole for premeditated murder, carrying weapons, use of weapons and possession of weapons, but did not include racist motives in the indictment. Liakopoulos and Stergiopoulos claimed that they attacked him "for a trivial reason" because he "cut them off on a bicycle".

Following the trial, the president of the Pakistani Community of Greece, Tzavent Ashlam, claimed that Golden Dawn was also responsible for six or seven murders and dozens of other attacks which were not pursued.

A second trial began on 16 April 2018 at the Athens Court of Appeal. On 6 May 2019, they were sentenced to 21 years and 5 months in prison each. The court rejected the defence's request to change the charge of manslaughter to fatal bodily harm or dangerous bodily harm. Claimed mitigating factors were also rejected, including a clean criminal record and sincere remorse, but good behaviour following the murder was taken into account.

In the subsequent Golden Dawn trial in October 2020, they were also both convicted of joining a criminal organisation.

== Aftermath ==
After Luqman's murder, Council of Europe Commissioner for Human Rights, Nils Muižnieks, visited Greece and accused authorities of failing to deal with racist violence and criminal activity of a Nazi organisation.

On 22 January 2013, the Chief of the Hellenic Police, Nikos Papagiannopoulos, announced the establishment of a new Department for Combating Racist Violence within the Directorate of State Security, which already been formally announced in August 2012 in Parliament by the Minister of Public Order and Citizen Protection, Nikos Dendias. A new hotline 11414 to register public complaints for attacks against migrants was also created.

The first case solved by the new department was the murders of Pakistani migrants by Golden Dawn armed groups in September 2012 in Metamorfosi. Goldsmith Konstantinos Kontomos was found guilty on 9 November 2017 and sentenced to 13 years and 4 months in prison by the Mixed Jury Court of Appeal of Athens.
