= Lela Mevorah =

Serbian librarian (1898–1972)

Lela A. Mevorah
- Born: January 17, 1898; Belgrade
- Died: November 13, 1972 (aged 74)
- Occupation: Librarian

Lela A. Mevorah (17 January 1898 – 13 November 1972) was a Serbian librarian and head of the Central Medical Library at the University of Belgrade Faculty of Medicine.

Mevorah was born in Belgrade to a Jewish family, the youngest of the four children and only daughter of Avram Mevorah, who worked in the Royal Currency Exchange with his father, and Esther (Koen) Mevorah, who formerly ran a wholesale store with her sister. In World War I, Lela Mevorah volunteered as a nurse at the age of sixteen. Her brothers served in the Royal Serbian Army. She completed high school in Nice, France. Her father did not permit her to study medicine, but she did study philosophy in Paris.

In World War II, Mevorah's father and two of her brothers were killed by Nazis in the Holocaust. Her brother Moše, then a lieutenant colonel in the Royal Yugoslav Army, was captured in 1941 and interned in a German POW camp, where he painted portraits of over 600 fellow prisoners. Lela Mevorah was herself captured in 1941 and interned in camps in Albania and Italy. In 1943, following Mussolini's death, the prisoners at Ferramonti di Tarsia were released, and Mevorah spent the rest of the war in Asti before returning to Serbia.

In 1946 the Central Medical Library was founded by Dr. Matija Ambrozić, who ran the library alone until Mevorah joined him there in 1947. Soon, she was appointed head of the Library, a post she held until her death in 1972.

The books of the University of Belgrade Faculty of Medicine were destroyed in the April 1941 Nazi bombing of the city. Materials for the new Library initially came from books liberated from the Germans by the National Liberation Army and donors including the United Jugoslav Fund from America, the World Health Organization, the British Council, the American Library in Belgrade, the embassy of France, and French scientists. By 1959 the Library had built a collection of 15,000 books and 850 journals.

Mevorah was cognizant of the need and the difficulties of accumulating current medical materials in a country with limited resources. In 1962 she wrote, "Diseases do not know borders; furthermore, progress and new methods of treatment should not know them either. Innovation should be accessible at the same time to a scientist as well as a physician lost in some remote area." She created a library bulletin about future publications in order to assist libraries with purchasing current materials with limited budgets. With her language skills she was able to assist doctors and students with foreign language materials.
