= Sylvia Lawler =

British geneticist

- Born: Sylvia Dorothy Corben; 15 January 1922; Bournemouth, England
- Died: 17 January 1996 (aged 74)
- Other names: Sylvia Dorothy Bagshawe
- Education: University College London
- Known for: Genetics, research into leukaemia and trophoblastic disease

Sylvia Dorothy Lawler (née Corben, later Bagshawe; 15 January 1922 – 17 January 1996) was an English geneticist who worked in the field of human genetics.

== Early life and education ==
Lawler was born and raised in Bournemouth, England, the only child of a furniture salesman and a schoolteacher. From 1939, she studied medicine at University College, London, graduating as the gold medalist of her year in 1945.

== Career ==
Lawler began her work on the newly discovered rhesus blood-group system, and in 1949 she was invited to join the world's first department for the study of human genetics at Galton Laboratory at University College, London. She went on to publish a book entitled Human Blood Groups and Inheritance in 1951 together with Lawrence J. Lawler, which was revised in 1957 and reprinted in 1966. Other publications during this period included A Genetical Study of the Gm Groups in Human Serum in 1960 and A pedigree showing some rare Rh genotypes.

Lawler was appointed as research scientist at the Institute of Cancer Research in London in 1960 and became the institute's first female professor in 1980. There she developed a broad interest in the genetics of malignancy. She made major contributions to the development of these tissue-typing techniques. Lawler laid the scientific foundation for work in bone-marrow transplantation and became chairman of the transplantation immunology subcommittee of the National Organ-Matching Service. She was a founder member of the International Workshops on Chromosomes in Leukaemia, and also established the first national fetal tissue bank in the UK, with support from the Medical Research Council.

== Research ==
A principal interest was in the genetic basis of trophoblastic disease, which encompasses molar pregnancies (hydatidiform moles) and choriocarcinoma, and in efforts to improve the diagnosis and treatment of this disease. Lawler's work on human leukocyte antigens (HLA) provided evidence that choriocarcinomas may arise from an earlier rather than simply the antecedent pregnancy. She went on to use genetic polymorphisms to determine the origins of complete and partial hydatidiform moles. Lawler was also a pioneer in the analysis of the human genome. She was a foundation member and fellow of the Royal College of Pathologists and an honorary fellow of the Royal College of Physicians.

== Personal life ==
She married Lawrence John Lawler who was captain in the Royal Electrical and Mechanical Engineers (REME); he later became a schoolteacher. They had one son, Anthony John born in 1955.

Lawler's first marriage was dissolved in 1976, and on 28 January 1977 she married Kenneth Dawson Bagshawe, professor of medical oncology in the University of London, and son of Harry Bagshawe. She died on 17 January 1996, two days after her 74th birthday.

== Legacy ==
Lawler's lifetime work was recognised in the form of the Royal Society of Medicine Sylvia Lawler prize; each year two prizes are offered for the best scientific paper and the best clinical paper.

== Selected publications ==
- Lawler, SD (1972). "Leukaemia". Journal of Clinical Pathology. 25 (11): 1008. doi:10.1136/jcp.25.11.1008-a. PMC 477602. PMID 4265193.
- Weitkamp, LR; Van Rood, JJ; Thorsby, E; Bias, W; Fotino, M; Lawler, SD; Dausset, J; Mayr, WR; Bodmer, J; Ward, FE; Seignalet, J; Payne, R; Kissmeyer-Nielsen, F; Gatti, RA; Sachs, JA; Lamm, LU (1973). "The relation of parental sex and age to recombination in the HL-A system". Human Heredity. 23 (3): 197–205. doi:10.1159/000152574. PMID 4760577.
- Kirkland, DJ; Lawler, SD; Venitt, S (1978). "Chromosomal damage and hair dyes". The Lancet. 2 (8081): 124–7. doi:10.1016/s0140-6736(78)91508-8. PMID 78325. S2CID 54418168.
- Lawler, SD; Pickthall, VJ; Fisher, RA; Povey, S; Evans, MW; Szulman, AE (1979). "Genetic studies of complete and partial hydatidiform moles". The Lancet. 2 (8142): 580. doi:10.1016/s0140-6736(79)91632-5. PMID 89576. S2CID 38356871.
- Turton, CW; Morris, L; Buckingham, JA; Lawler, SD; Turner-Warwick, M (1979). "Histocompatibility antigens in asthma: population and family studies". Thorax. 34 (5): 670–6. doi:10.1136/thx.34.5.670. PMC 471146. PMID 515989.
- Kay, HE; Powles, RL; Lawler, SD; Clink, HM (1980). "Cost of bone-marrow transplants in acute myeloid leukaemia". The Lancet. 1 (8177): 1067–9. doi:10.1016/s0140-6736(80)91508-1. PMID 6103400. S2CID 45280646.
- Singh, SP; Vyramuthu, N; Margoles, C; Lawler, SD (1980). "Fetal tissue typing". Indian Journal of Experimental Biology. 18 (3): 285–6. PMID 7390562.
