= List of people with surname Smith =

Smith is one of the most common surnames in the English-speaking world. Following is a list of notable people with the surname Smith.

== People with less common given names ==
=== A ===
- A. Hyatt Smith (1814–1892), American politician
- A. Ledyard Smith (1901–1985), American archaeologist
- Abby Hadassah Smith (1797–1879), American suffragist
- Abigail Smith (fl. 1990s–2010s), New Zealand academic
- Addie Viola Smith (1893–1975), American attorney, trade commissioner, and Foreign Service officer
- Ahmaad Smith (born 1983), American football player
- Ainias Smith (born 2001), American football player
- Akili Smith (born 1975), Canadian and American football player
- Alanna Smith (born 1996), Australian basketball player
- Aldon Smith (born 1989), American football player
- Aleck Smith (1871–1919), American baseball catcher
- Ali Smith (born 1962), Scottish novelist and writer
- Amalie Smith (borh 2009), British swimmer
- Amalie Smith (writer) (born 1985) Danish writer and visual artist
- Ambrose Smith (died 1584), English textile merchant and landowner
- Amos Smith (1944–2025), American chemist and academic
- Angela Yuriko Smith, Ryukyuan-American writer and publisher
- Anno Smith (1915–1990), Dutch ceramist, painter and sculptor
- Apisai Smith (born 1983), New Zealand-based Fijian footballer
- Arabella Smith (fl. 1990s), Turks and Caicos Islands politician
- Argile Smith (born 1955), clergyman and interim university president
- Arian Smith (born 2001), American football player
- Arkell Smith (born 1999), American gridiron football player
- Árón Smith (born 1989), Irish racing driver
- Ashbel Smith (1805–1886), father of the University of Texas, politician, doctor
- August E. Smith (1879–1969), American politician and educator
- Augustine C. Smith (1789–1843), American politician from Virginia

=== B ===
- Bella Smith (born 2001), Australian rules footballer
- Bessie Smith (1894–1937), American blues singer
- Braden Smith (American football) (born 1996), American football player
- Braden Smith (basketball) (born 2003), American basketball player
- Brandt Smith (born 1959), American politician
- Brashard Smith (born 2003), American football player
- Bruton Smith (1927–2022), American car racing promoter and CEO
- Bubba Smith (1945–2011), American football player and actor
- Burch Smith (born 1990), American baseball player

=== C ===
- C. Aubrey Smith (1863–1948), English cricketer and actor
- Cade Smith (born 1999), Canadian baseball player
- Cal Smith (1932–2013), American country singer
- Catherine Drummond Smith (1888–1979), Australian woman geologist
- Cauleen Smith (born 1967), American filmmaker and multimedia artist
- Celestine Smith (1903–1975), American psychotherapist
- Chandler Smith (born 2002), American racing driver
- Charitie Lees Smith (1741–1823), Irish hymnwriter, religious writer
- Chloe Smith (born 1982), British Conservative party politician
- Chloe Smith (musician) (born c. 1983 or 1984), singer with Rising Appalachia
- Christen Smith (1785–1816), Norwegian naturalist, aka Christian or Chretien Smith
- Christy Smith (basketball) (born 1975), American basketball player
- Cleo Smith (born 2017/2018), Australian victim of Abduction of Cleo Smith
- Colleen Smith (1925–2018), Canadian baseball player
- Colson Smith (born 1998), English actor
- Connie Smith (born 1941), American musician
- Conrad Smith (born 1981), New Zealand rugby player
- Constance Smith (1929–2003), Irish actor
- Cordwainer Smith (pen name; 1913–1966), American science fiction author
- Cotesworth P. Smith (1807–1862), Justice of the Supreme Court of Mississippi

=== D ===
- Daisy Smith (1891–1983), British artist
- Dallas Smith (born 1977), Canadian singer and songwriter
- Dallas Smith (ice hockey) (born 1941), Canadian ice hockey player
- Dallis Smith (born 1965), American football player
- Dalton Smith (born 1997), British boxer
- D'Ante Smith (born 1998), American football player
- Delazon Smith (1816–1860), American politician
- Delbert K. Smith (1862–1905), American politician
- Delia Smith (born 1941), British television cook
- Delia Dueñas Smith (1966–1985), stage name Pepsi Paloma, Filipino-American dancer and actress
- Delos H. Smith (1884–1963), American architect
- DeMaurice Smith (born 1964), American lawyer and labor official
- Dena A. Smith (1899–1968), American politician
- Derron Smith (born 1992), American football player
- De'Veon Smith (born 1994), American football player
- Devon Smith (born 1981), Grenadian cricketer
- DeVonta Smith (born 1998), American football player
- Dewey Smith (1972–2009), American aquanaut
- Dhane Smith (born 1992), Canadian lacrosse player
- Digby Smith (1935–2024), British military historian
- Dinitia Smith (born 1945), American author and filmmaker
- D'Joun Smith (born 1992), American football player
- Dodie Smith (1896–1990), English novelist and playwright
- Donta Smith (born 1983), professional basketball player in the Israeli Basketball Premier League
- Dudley Smith (1926–2016), British politician
- Dwayne Smith (born 1983), Barbadian cricketer

=== E ===
- E. E. Smith (1890–1965), American science fiction author
- Eben Smith (1832–1906), American businessman
- Edmond L. Smith (1829–1891), American politician from Pennsylvania and Colorado
- Effie Smith (1914–1977), American jazz and blues singer and comedian
- Egerton Smith (1774–1841), British publisher
- Elerson Smith (born 1998), American football player
- Elihu Hubbard Smith (1771–1798), American physician and man of letters
- Elleine Smith (unknown–1579), English woman executed for witchcraft
- Elliott Smith (disambiguation), multiple people
  - Elliott Smith (1969–2003), American singer-songwriter
- Ellis Smith (1896–1969), British Labour Party politician
- Ellison D. Smith (1864–1944), American politician, South Carolina senator
- Elske Smith (born 1929), Dutch-American astronomer
- Emmitt Smith (born 1969), American football player
- Erik Smith (1931–2004), German-born British record producer, pianist and harpsichordist
- Erwin Frink Smith (1854–1927), American bacteriologist
- Estelle Turrell Smith (1854–after 1896), American social reformer
- Eugénie M. Rayé-Smith (1871–1914), American lawyer and suffragist
- Eva Munson Smith (1843–1915), American composer, poet, author
- Edward John Smith (1850–1912), English sea captain, Naval officer, Captain of the RMS Titanic

=== F ===
- Fayette Smith (1830–1867), American politician
- Fyang Smith (born 2006), Filipino-American social media influencer, model and actress

=== G ===
- Gabriella Smith (swimmer) (born 2006), New Zealand para swimmer
- Garth Smith (born 1955), bassist
- Garth Smith (musician, born 1960), LDS musician
- Genesis Smith (born 2004), American football player
- Geno Smith (born 1990), American football player
- George D. W. Smith (born 1943), British materials scientist
- Gerald Lee Smith (born 1983), American rapper known as "Nekro G"
- Germany Smith (1863–1927), 19th-century American baseball player
- Gerrit Smith (1797–1874), philanthropist, abolitionist, U.S. Representative from New York
- Gertrude Smith (1894–1985), American classicist
- Gideon B. Smith (1793–1867), American physician, editor, and entomologist
- Giles Alexander Smith (1829–1876), Union Army general in the American Civil War
- Givani Smith (born 1998), Canadian ice hockey player
- Grace Cossington Smith (1892–1984), Australian artist
- Granger Smith (born 1979), American country music singer
- Gretchen Smith (fl. 2010s), New York City Ballet dancer
- Griffin Smith (1885–1955), Chief Justice of the Arkansas Supreme Court

=== H ===
- Hagen Smith (born 2003), American baseball player
- Hart F. Smith (born 1962), American mathematician
- Harvest Smith (born 1963), American basketball player
- Haskett Smith (preacher) (1847–1906), English missionary in Egypt
- Hayden Smith (born 1985), Australian player of American football
- Haydon Smith (1901–1948), English cricketer
- Herman L. Smith (1892–1950), American mathematician
- Hobart Muir Smith (1912–2013), American herpetologist
- Hoke L. Smith (1931–2004), American university president
- Honor Smith (1908–1995), English neurologist
- Hooley Smith (1903–1963), Canadian ice hockey player
- Horton Smith (1908–1963), American golf player
- Huey "Piano" Smith (1934–2023), American R&B pianist
- Huston Smith (1919–2016), American-Chinese scholar of religious studies, and author

=== I ===
- Ian Smith (archaeologist) (1954–2020), New Zealand archaeologist
- Ira Harvey Smith (1815–1883), Kansas state politician
- Irv Smith Jr. (born 1998), American football player
- Irving Smith (cricketer) (1884–1971), English cricketer
- Irving Smith (RAF officer) (1917–2000), New Zealand flying ace
- Ito Smith (born 1995), American football player

=== J ===
- Jabari Smith (born 1977), American basketball player
- Jabari Smith Jr. (born 2003), American basketball player
- Jaclyn Smith (born 1945), American actress
- Jacqui Smith (born 1962), British politician
- Jada Pinkett Smith (born 1971), American actress and Will Smith's wife
- Jaden Smith (born 1998), American actor, son of actor Will Smith
- Jaleen Smith (born 1994), American basketball player
- Jalen Smith (born 2000), American basketball player
- Jamill Smith (born 1991), American football player
- Jane Farwell Smith (1906–1997), American clubwoman
- Jasper Smith (born 1965), English entrepreneur
- Jasper K. Smith (1905–1992), American politician
- Jaylin Smith (born 2003), American football player
- Jaylon Smith (born 1995), American football player
- Jedediah Smith (1799–1831), American frontiersman, explorer, cartographer and writer
- Jill W. Smith (born 1953), American philanthropist
- J'Mar Smith (born 1996), American football player
- Jonnu Smith (born 1995), American football player
- Joy Smith (born 1947), Canadian House of Commons member
- J. R. Smith (born 1985), American basketball player
- Juliet Smith, American politician
- Justice Smith (born 1995), American film and television actor

=== K ===
- Kaden Smith (born 1997), American football player
- Kaleena Smith, American basketball player
- Kandie Smith (born 1969), American politician
- Kane Smith (born 1996), English footballer
- Katrina Smith (born 1973 or 1974), American politician
- Karin Smith (born 1955), American javelin thrower
- Katie Smith (born 1974), American basketball player
- Keely Smith (1928–2017), American singer
- Kem Smith, American politician
- Kenton Smith (born 1979), Canadian ice hockey player
- Kermit Smith (fl. 2000s–2020s), American college baseball player and coach
- Kerr Smith (born 1972), American actor
- Kim Thomas Smith, American politician
- Kion Smith (born 1998), American football player
- KJ Smith (born 1985), American actress
- Klondike Smith (1887–1959), English baseball player
- Kobe Smith (born 1998), American football player
- Korey Smith (born 1991), English footballer
- Kurtwood Smith (born 1943), American actor

=== L ===
- L. J. Smith (born 1980), American football player
- Lane Smith (1936–2005), American actor
- Langley Frank Willard Smith (1897–1917), Canadian military pilot
- Larkin I. Smith (1944–1989), Mississippi politician
- Lars Olsson Smith (1836–1913), Swedish distiller and politician
- Laurids Smith (1754–1794), Danish clergyman, philosopher and early animal rights writer
- Laverne Smith (born 1954), American football player
- Lawrie Smith (born 1956), British sailor
- Lecitus Smith (born 1998), American football player
- Lenny Smith (born 1942), American singer, songwriter, and music publisher
- Lenzelle Smith Jr. (born 1991), American basketball player
- Leslee Smith (born 1990), British Virgin Islands basketball player
- Lewis Arthur Smith (1869–1958), American architect
- Loren A. Smith (born 1944), judge of the United States Court of Federal Claims
- Lovie Smith (born 1958), American football coach
- Lot Smith (1830–1892), American politician, soldier, and Mormon pioneer
- Lucien Smith (1989–2026), American artist
- Lucille Elizabeth Bishop Smith (1892–1985), American entrepreneur, chef, and inventor
- Lucky Blue Smith (born 1998), American model and musician
- Luella Dowd Smith (1847–1941), American poet, author
- Lura Eugenie Brown Smith (1864–?), American journalist, newspaper editor, author

=== M ===
- M. Hoke Smith (1855–1931), United States Secretary of the Interior
- Maason Smith (born 2002), American football player
- Macdonald Smith (1890–1949), Scottish–American professional golfer
- Madeleine Smith (1835–1928), Scottish murder suspect
- Madeline Smith (born 1949), English actress
- Maggie Smith (1934–2024), English actress
- Maisie Smith (born 2001), English actress and singer
- Marla Smith, American politician
- Margo Smith (1939–2024), American country music singer
- Marguerite L. Smith (1894–1985), New York assemblywoman
- Marilynn Smith (1929–2019), American golfer
- Marva Smith (fl. 1970s–2010s), Manitoba judge
- Mayo Smith (1915–1977), American baseball player and manager
- Mazi Smith (born 2001), American football player
- Mervyn Ashmore Smith (1904–1994), Australian artist
- Mia Smith (born 1994), British actress
- Milan Smith (born 1942), judge of the United States Court of Appeals for the Ninth Circuit
- Mili Smith (born 1998), Scottish curler
- Miriam Smith (filmmaker), 21st century New Zealand filmmaker
- Miriam Smith (swimmer) (born 1958), American swimmer
- Moses "Whispering" Smith (1932–1984), American blues harmonicist and singer

=== N ===
- Nadine Smith (born 1965), American LGBTQ+ rights activist
- NaLyssa Smith (born 2000), American basketball player
- Nan Macpherson Smith (d. 1940) Canadian leader in women’s activities, as well patriotic, philanthropic, cultural, missionary, and benevolent projects
- Nana Smith (born 1971), American tennis player
- Nellie von Gerichten Smith (1871–1952), American composer
- Nicol Smith (writer), American writer
- Niki Smith, American author and cartoonist
- Noah Olivier Smith (born 2000), American rapper known professionally as Yeat
- Noland Smith (born 1943), American football player
- Nora Archibald Smith (1859–1934), American children's book author

=== O ===
- Odean Smith (born 1996), West Indies cricket player
- Omar Smith (born 1977), American football player
- Orland Smith (1825–1903), American Civil War general
- Orlando Smith (born 1944), Virgin Islands politician
- Ozzie Smith (born 1954), American baseball player

=== P ===
- Paris Smith (fl. 2010s), American actress
- Patti Smith (born 1946), American musician and artist
- Paula Smith (born 1957), American tennis player
- Pavin Smith (born 1996), American baseball player
- Penny Smith (born 1958), English television presenter and newsreader
- Pepe Smith (1947–2019), Filipino singer-songwriter and drummer
- Percey F. Smith (1867–1956), American mathematician
- Persifor Frazer Smith (1798–1858), American military officer
- Persifor Frazer Smith (politician) (1808–1882), American politician and lawyer
- Peyton Alex Smith (born 1994), American actor and rapper
- Phyllida Crowley Smith (born 1968), English ballerina, theatre actress and choreographer
- Phyllis Smith (born 1951), American actress and casting associate
- Placida Garcia Smith (1896–1981), community organizer
- Powel J. Smith (1874–1942), American businessman and politician
- Presley Smith (born 2003), United States badminton player

=== Q ===
- Q. Smith, American stage actress

=== R ===
- Rachel Smith (born 1985), Miss USA 2007
- Ragan Smith (born 2000), American Gymnast
- Randolph "Bouncer" Smith, American fishing guide and conservationist
- Regina R. Smith (1937–2005), American politician
- Reilly Smith (born 1991), Canadian ice hockey player
- Renée Felice Smith (born 1985), American actress
- Rex Smith (born 1955), American actor and singer
- Rhona Smith, British legal academic and UN special rapporteur
- Robert Payne Smith (1818–1895), British clergyman and theologian
- Roquan Smith (born 1997), American football player
- Rosetta Smith (1770–1775—ca. 1825), Afro-Trinidadian slave trader and entrepreneur
- Ruby Smith (1903–1977), American classic female blues singer

=== S ===
- S. Talbot Smith (1861–1948), South Australian lawyer and journalist
- St. Clair Smith (1889–1988), Justice of the South Dakota Supreme Court
- Saivion Smith (born 1997), American football player
- Sam Smith (born 1992), English singer and songwriter
- Sammi Smith (1943–2005), American country music singer
- Sammie Smith (born 1967), American football player
- Sammy Smith (born 2003), American racing driver
- Sanford W. Smith (1869–1929), New York politician
- Saxton Smith (1802–1890), New York politician
- Sekou Smith (1972–2021), American sportswriter
- Shepard Smith (born 1964), American news anchor
- Sheridan Smith (born 1981), English actress
- Shi Smith (born 1998), American football player
- Shoham Smith, Israeli writer
- Skyrocket Smith (1868–1916), American baseball player
- Soapy Smith (1860–1898), alias of Jefferson Randolph Smith, American confidence man
- Sonny Smith (born 1936), American college basketball coach
- Sonny Smith (musician) (born 1972), American musician and playwright
- Sonya Smith (born 1972), Hispanic and Latin-American telenovela actress
- Speedy Smith (born 1993), American basketball player
- Stef Smith (playwright), Scottish playwright
- Stefan Smith (born 1989), Antiguan footballer
- Stephen Edward Smith (1927–1990), American financial analyst, political strategist, brother-in-law John Fitzgerald Kennedy
- Steve Smith (born 1989), Australian cricket player and former captain
- Stow Smith (1864–1963), Australian stockbroker philanthropist
- Stuff Smith (1909–1967), American jazz violinist
- Sutton Smith (born 1996), American football player

=== T ===
- T. Alford-Smith (1864–1936), British geographer
- T. J. Smith (born 1997), American football player
- Taryn Delanie Smith (born 1997/1998), African-American beauty pageant competitor
- Terell Smith (born 1999), American football player
- Terquavion Smith (born 2002), American basketball player
- Therrell C. Smith (1917–2025), American ballet dancer and dance educator
- Tiffany Smith (born 1982), American actor
- Tiger Smith (1886–1979), English cricketer
- Tim Smith, Australian comedian, known for The Comedy Company
- Titus Smith Jr. (1768–1850), Canadian farmer, surveyor, and botanist
- Tina Smith (born 1958), American politician
- Todd Smith (born 1984), American professional wrestler known as Todd Hanson or Ivar
- Tolu Smith (born 2000), American basketball player
- Tommie Smith (born 1944), American athlete and football player
- Torrey Smith (born 1989), American football player
- Tremon Smith (born 1996), American football player
- Tre'Quan Smith (born 1996), American football player
- Trevis Smith (born 1976), Canadian football linebacker
- Trinity Smith (born 2004), Jersey cricketer
- Tubby Smith (born 1951), American college basketball coach
- Truett Smith (1924–2000), American football player
- Tykee Smith (born 2001), American football player
- Tyran Smith (born 1974), New Zealand rugby league footballer
- Tyreke Smith (born 2000), American football player
- Tyresa Smith (born 1985), American basketball player
- Tyron Smith (born 1990), American football player
- Tyson Smith (born 1983), Canadian professional wrestler known as Kenny Omega

=== V–Z ===
- Verdell Smith (born 1963), American professional boxer
- Verdelle Smith (fl. 1960s), American pop singer
- Viola Smith (1912–2020), American musician and drummer
- Vyncint Smith (born 1996), American football player
- Wanisha Smith (born 1985), American basketball player
- Watson Smith (1897–1993), American archaeologist
- Will Smith, American actor and singer
- Willow Smith (born 2000), American entertainer, daughter of actor Will Smith
- Wilson Smith (1897–1965), British virologist
- Winford Henry Smith (1877–1961), American physician
- Winifred Smith (1858–1925), English botanist and educationist
- Winifred Smith (1911–2004), British organist
- Worthington Curtis Smith (1823–1894), American politician
- Worthington George Smith (1835–1917), English mycologist and archaeologist
- Wycliffe Smith (born 1948), Prime Minister of Sint Maarten
- Xanthus Russell Smith (1839–1929)), American marine painter
- Xavier Smith (born 1997), American football player
- Yeardley Smith (born 1964), French-born American actress, comedian and writer
- Za'Darius Smith (born 1992), American football player
- Zadie Smith (born 1975), English writer
- Zhaire Smith (born 1999), American basketball player

== Disambiguation pages ==
=== A ===
- Aaron Smith (disambiguation)
- Abel Smith (disambiguation)
- Abraham Smith (disambiguation)
- Abram Smith (disambiguation)
- Adam Smith (disambiguation)
- Adrian Smith (disambiguation)
- Al Smith (disambiguation)
- Alan Smith (disambiguation)
- Alana Smith (disambiguation)
- Albert Smith (disambiguation)
- Alex Smith (disambiguation)
- Alexander Smith (disambiguation)
- Alfred Smith (disambiguation)
- Alice Smith (disambiguation)
- Allison Smith (disambiguation)
- Alvin Smith (disambiguation)
- Amanda Smith (disambiguation)
- Amy Smith (disambiguation)
- Andre Smith (disambiguation)
- Andrea Smith (disambiguation)
- Andrew Smith (disambiguation)
- Angela Smith (disambiguation)
- Anna Smith (disambiguation)
- Anne Smith (disambiguation)
- Annie Smith (disambiguation)
- Anthony Smith (disambiguation)
- Antonio Smith (disambiguation)
- April Smith (disambiguation)
- Archibald Smith (disambiguation)
- Archie Smith (disambiguation)
- Arnold Smith (disambiguation)
- Art Smith (disambiguation)
- Arthur Smith (disambiguation)
- Ashley Smith (disambiguation)
- Augustus Smith (disambiguation)
- Austin Smith (disambiguation)

=== B ===
- Barbara Smith (disambiguation)
- Barry Smith (disambiguation)
- Ben Smith (disambiguation)
- Bernard Smith (disambiguation)
- Bert Smith (disambiguation)
- Betty Smith (disambiguation)
- Brad Smith (disambiguation)
- Brandon Smith (disambiguation)
- Brendan Smith (disambiguation)
- Brian Smith (disambiguation)
- Brittany Smith (disambiguation)
- Brooke Smith (disambiguation)
- Bruce Smith (disambiguation)
- Bryan Smith (disambiguation)
- Bud Smith (disambiguation)

=== C ===
- Caleb Smith (disambiguation)
- Calvin Smith (disambiguation)
- Cameron Smith (disambiguation)
- Carl Smith (disambiguation)
- Cary Smith (disambiguation)
- Cecil Smith (disambiguation)
- Cedric Smith (disambiguation)
- Chad Smith (disambiguation)
- Charles Smith (disambiguation)
- Charlotte Smith (disambiguation)
- Chris Smith (disambiguation)
- Christian Smith (disambiguation)
- Christina Smith (disambiguation)
- Christine Smith (disambiguation)
- Christopher Smith (disambiguation)
- Chuck Smith (disambiguation)
- Clarence Smith (disambiguation)
- Clark Smith (disambiguation)
- Clay Smith (disambiguation)
- Clement Smith (disambiguation)
- Clifford Smith (disambiguation)
- Clifton Smith (disambiguation)
- Clive Smith (disambiguation)
- Clyde Smith (disambiguation)
- Cole Smith (disambiguation)
- Colin Smith (disambiguation)
- Corey Smith (disambiguation)
- Courtney Smith (disambiguation)
- Craig Smith (disambiguation)
- Curt Smith (disambiguation)
- Cyril Smith (disambiguation)

=== D ===
- Dale Smith (disambiguation)
- Damian Smith (disambiguation)
- Damien Smith (disambiguation)
- Dan Smith (disambiguation)
- Daniel Smith (disambiguation)
- Danny Smith (disambiguation)
- Darrell Smith (disambiguation)
- Darren Smith (disambiguation)
- Daryl Smith (disambiguation)
- Dave Smith (disambiguation)
- David Smith (disambiguation)
- Dean Smith (disambiguation)
- Debbie Smith (disambiguation)
- Denis Smith (disambiguation)
- Dennis Smith (disambiguation)
- Derek Smith (disambiguation)
- Derrick Smith (disambiguation)
- Des Smith (disambiguation)
- Devin Smith (disambiguation)
- Dick Smith (disambiguation)
- Dominic Smith (disambiguation)
- Don Smith (disambiguation)
- Donald Smith (disambiguation)
- Donna Smith (disambiguation)
- Douglas Smith (disambiguation)
- Drew Smith (disambiguation)
- Dwight Smith (disambiguation)
- Dylan Smith (disambiguation)

=== E ===
- Earl Smith (disambiguation)
- Ed Smith (disambiguation)
- Edgar Smith (disambiguation)
- Edith Smith (disambiguation)
- Edmund Smith (disambiguation)
- Edward Smith (disambiguation)
- Edwin Smith (disambiguation)
- Elaine Smith (disambiguation)
- Elbert Smith (disambiguation)
- Elijah Smith (disambiguation)
- Elizabeth Smith (disambiguation)
- Ella Smith (disambiguation)
- Elmer Smith (disambiguation)
- Eloise Smith (disambiguation)
- Emily Smith (disambiguation)
- Emma Smith (disambiguation)
- Emmanuel Smith (disambiguation)
- Eric Smith (disambiguation)
- Ernest Smith (disambiguation)
- Ernie Smith (disambiguation)
- Ethan Smith (disambiguation)
- Ethel Smith (disambiguation)
- Eugene Smith (disambiguation)

=== F ===
- Fiona Smith (disambiguation)
- Floyd Smith (disambiguation)
- Frances Smith (disambiguation)
- Francis Smith (disambiguation)
- Frank Smith (disambiguation)
- Fred Smith (disambiguation)

=== G ===
- Gary Smith (disambiguation)
- Gavin Smith (disambiguation)
- Gene Smith (disambiguation)
- Geoff Smith (disambiguation)
- Geoffrey Smith (disambiguation)
- George Smith (disambiguation)
- George Albert Smith (disambiguation)
- George E. Smith (disambiguation)
- George P. Smith (disambiguation)
- George W. Smith (disambiguation)
- Gerald Smith (disambiguation)
- Gerard Smith (disambiguation)
- Glen Smith (disambiguation)
- Gordon Smith (disambiguation)
- Graeme Smith (disambiguation)
- Graham Smith (disambiguation)
- Grant Smith (disambiguation)
- Gregory Smith (disambiguation)
- Guy Smith (disambiguation)

=== H ===
- Hal Smith (disambiguation)
- Hamilton Smith (disambiguation)
- Hank Smith (disambiguation)
- Hannah Smith (disambiguation)
- Harold Smith (disambiguation)
- Harrison Smith (disambiguation)
- Harry Smith (disambiguation)
- Harvey Smith (disambiguation)
- Hayley Smith (disambiguation)
- Helen Smith (disambiguation)
- Henry Smith (disambiguation)
- Herbert Smith (disambiguation)
- Hilda Smith (disambiguation)
- Holly Smith (disambiguation)
- Horace Smith (disambiguation)
- Howard Smith (disambiguation)
- Hugh Smith (disambiguation)
- Humphrey Smith (disambiguation)
- Hyrum Smith (disambiguation)

=== I ===
- Ian Smith (disambiguation)
- Ira Smith (disambiguation)
- Isaac Smith (disambiguation)
- Ivor Smith (disambiguation)

=== J ===
- J. Smith (disambiguation)
- Jack Smith (disambiguation)
- Jackie Smith (disambiguation)
- Jacob Smith (disambiguation)
- Jake Smith (disambiguation)
- James Smith (disambiguation)
- Jamie Smith (disambiguation)
- Jane Smith (disambiguation)
- Janet Smith (disambiguation)
- Jason Smith (disambiguation)
- Jay Smith (disambiguation)
- Jaylen Smith (disambiguation)
- Jean Smith (disambiguation)
- Jeff Smith (disambiguation)
- Jennifer Smith (disambiguation)
- Jeremiah Smith (disambiguation)
- Jeremy Smith (disambiguation)
- Jerome Smith (disambiguation)
- Jerry Smith (disambiguation)
- Jesse Smith (disambiguation)
- Jessica Smith (disambiguation)
- Jessie Smith (disambiguation)
- Jim Smith (disambiguation)
- Jimmy Smith (disambiguation)
- Joan Smith (disambiguation)
- Joannes Jacobus Smith, Dutch botanist
- John Smith (disambiguation)
- Johnny Smith (disambiguation)
- Johnson Smith (disambiguation)
- Jonathan Smith (disambiguation)
- Jordan Smith (disambiguation)
- Joseph Smith (disambiguation)
- Josh Smith (disambiguation)
- Joshua Smith (disambiguation)
- Josiah Smith (disambiguation)
- J. T. Smith (disambiguation)
- Julia Smith (disambiguation)
- Julian Smith (disambiguation)
- Julie Smith (disambiguation)
- June Smith (disambiguation)
- Justin Smith (disambiguation)

=== K ===
- Karen Smith (disambiguation)
- Karl Smith (disambiguation)
- Kate Smith (disambiguation)
- Katherine Smith (disambiguation)
- Kathleen Smith (disambiguation)
- Kathy Smith (disambiguation)
- Kay Smith (disambiguation)
- Keith Smith (disambiguation)
- Kelly Smith (disambiguation)
- Kenneth Smith (disambiguation)
- Kent Smith (disambiguation)
- Kevin Smith (disambiguation)
- Kim Smith (disambiguation)
- Kirsten Smith (disambiguation)
- Kyle Smith (disambiguation)

=== L ===
- Lamar Smith (disambiguation)
- Lance Smith (disambiguation)
- Larry Smith (disambiguation)
- Laura Smith (disambiguation)
- Lauren Smith (disambiguation)
- Lawrence Smith (disambiguation)
- Leah Smith (disambiguation)
- Lee Smith (disambiguation)
- Leighton Smith (disambiguation)
- Lemuel Smith (disambiguation)
- Leo Smith (disambiguation)
- Leon Smith (disambiguation)
- Leonard Smith (disambiguation)
- Leroy Smith (disambiguation)
- Leslie Smith (disambiguation)
- Lester Smith (disambiguation)
- Lewis Smith (disambiguation)
- Liam Smith (disambiguation)
- Lillian Smith (disambiguation)
- Linda Smith (disambiguation)
- Lisa Smith (disambiguation)
- Liz Smith (disambiguation)
- Lonnie Smith (disambiguation)
- Louis Smith (disambiguation)
- Lucy Smith (disambiguation)
- Luke Smith (disambiguation)

=== M ===
- Malcolm Smith (disambiguation)
- Marc Smith (disambiguation)
- Marcus Smith (disambiguation)
- Margaret Smith (disambiguation)
- Maria Smith (disambiguation)
- Marie Smith (disambiguation)
- Mark Smith (disambiguation)
- Marshall Smith (disambiguation)
- Martha Smith (disambiguation)
- Martin Smith (disambiguation)
- Martyn Smith (disambiguation)
- Mary Smith (disambiguation)
- Matthew Smith (disambiguation)
- Maurice Smith (disambiguation)
- May Smith (disambiguation)
- Melanie Smith (disambiguation)
- Melvin Smith (disambiguation)
- Michael Smith (disambiguation)
- Michelle Smith (disambiguation)
- Morgan Smith (disambiguation)
- Murray Smith (disambiguation)

=== N ===
- Nate Smith (disambiguation)
- Nathan Smith (disambiguation)
- Neil Smith (disambiguation)
- Neville Smith (disambiguation)
- Nicholas Smith (disambiguation)
- Nick Smith (disambiguation)
- Nigel Smith (disambiguation)
- Noel Smith (disambiguation)
- Norman Smith (disambiguation)

=== O ===
- Olive Smith (disambiguation)
- Oliver Smith (disambiguation)
- Oscar Smith (disambiguation)
- Otis Smith (disambiguation)
- Owen Smith (disambiguation)

=== P ===
- Paddy Smith (disambiguation)
- Pamela Smith (disambiguation)
- Pat Smith (disambiguation)
- Patricia Smith (disambiguation)
- Patrick Smith (disambiguation)
- Paul Smith (disambiguation)
- Percy Smith (disambiguation)
- Perry Smith (disambiguation)
- Pete Smith (disambiguation)
- Peter Smith (disambiguation)
- Philip Smith (disambiguation)
- Preston Smith (disambiguation)

=== R ===
- R. Smith (disambiguation)
- Randall Smith (disambiguation)
- Randy Smith (disambiguation)
- Ralph Smith (disambiguation)
- Rashad Smith (disambiguation)
- Ray Smith (disambiguation)
- Raymond Smith (disambiguation)
- R. B. Smith (disambiguation)
- Rebecca Smith (disambiguation)
- Red Smith (disambiguation)
- Regan Smith (disambiguation)
- Reginald Smith (disambiguation)
- Rex Smith (disambiguation)
- Richard Smith (disambiguation)
- Rick Smith (disambiguation)
- Ricky Smith (disambiguation)
- Robert Smith (disambiguation)
- Robin Smith (disambiguation)
- Rod Smith (disambiguation)
- Roger Smith (disambiguation)
- Ron Smith (disambiguation)
- Ronnie Smith (disambiguation)
- Ross Smith (disambiguation)
- Roy Smith (disambiguation)
- Rupert Smith (disambiguation)
- Russell Smith (disambiguation)
- Rusty Smith (disambiguation)
- Ruth Smith (disambiguation)
- Ryan Smith (disambiguation)

=== S ===
- Sally Smith (disambiguation)
- Sam Smith (disambiguation)
- Samantha Smith (disambiguation)
- Sandra Smith (disambiguation)
- Sarah Smith (disambiguation)
- Scott Smith (disambiguation)
- Sean Smith (disambiguation)
- Shane Smith (disambiguation)
- Shannon Smith (disambiguation)
- Sharon Smith (disambiguation)
- Shaun Smith (disambiguation)
- Shelley Smith (disambiguation)
- Sherri Smith (disambiguation)
- Shirley Smith (disambiguation)
- Sid Smith (disambiguation)
- Sidney Smith (disambiguation)
- Simon Smith (disambiguation)
- Sinclair Smith (disambiguation)
- Sophia Smith (disambiguation)
- Spencer Smith (disambiguation)
- Stan Smith (disambiguation)
- Steven Smith (disambiguation)
- Stewart Smith (disambiguation)
- Stuart Smith (disambiguation)
- Sue Smith (disambiguation)
- Susan Smith (disambiguation)
- Sydney Smith (disambiguation)

=== T ===
- Tara Smith (disambiguation)
- Ted Smith (disambiguation)
- Terence Smith (disambiguation)
- Terry Smith (disambiguation)
- Thomas Smith (disambiguation)
- Tim Smith (disambiguation)
- Toby Smith (disambiguation)
- Todd Smith (disambiguation)
- Tom Smith (disambiguation)
- Tommy Smith (disambiguation)
- Tony Smith (disambiguation)
- Tracy Smith (disambiguation)
- Travis Smith (disambiguation)
- Trevor Smith (disambiguation)
- Trey Smith (disambiguation)
- Troy Smith (disambiguation)
- Ty Smith (disambiguation)
- Tyler Smith (disambiguation)
- Tyrone Smith (disambiguation)
- Tyson Smith (disambiguation)

=== V ===
- Vernon Smith (disambiguation)
- Victor Smith (disambiguation)
- Vincent Smith (disambiguation)
- Violet Smith (disambiguation)
- Virgil Smith (disambiguation)
- Virginia Smith (disambiguation)
- Vivian Smith (disambiguation)

=== W ===
- Wallace Smith (disambiguation)
- Wally Smith (disambiguation)
- Walter Smith (disambiguation)
- Warren Smith (disambiguation)
- Wayne Smith (disambiguation)
- Wendy Smith (disambiguation)
- Wilbur Smith (disambiguation)
- Wilf Smith (disambiguation)
- Willard Smith (disambiguation)
- William Smith (disambiguation)
- Wilma Smith (disambiguation)
- Winston Smith (disambiguation)

=== Z ===
- Zachary Smith (disambiguation)
- Zane Smith (disambiguation)
- Zoe Smith (disambiguation)

== By title ==
- Admiral Smith (disambiguation), multiple people
- Archbishop Smith (disambiguation), multiple people
- Attorney General Smith (disambiguation), multiple people
- Bishop Smith (disambiguation), multiple people
- Captain Smith (disambiguation), multiple people
- Doctor Smith (disambiguation), multiple people
- General Smith (disambiguation), multiple people
- Governor Smith (disambiguation), multiple people
- Judge Smith (disambiguation), multiple people
- Justice Smith (disambiguation), multiple people
- Mayor Smith (disambiguation), multiple people
- President Smith (disambiguation), multiple people
- Representative Smith (disambiguation), multiple people
- Reverend Smith (disambiguation), multiple people
- Senator Smith (disambiguation), multiple people
- Sgt. Smith (disambiguation), multiple people

== Fictional characters ==
Note: works with multiple Smiths are listed first, followed by Smiths with a title instead of a given name, and ending with a list of individual Smiths sorted by given name.

- The Smith family in the Adult Swim/Oni Press franchise Rick and Morty
  - Beth Smith (née Sanchez)
  - Morty Smith, a titular character, Beth's son
  - Summer Smith, Beth's daughter
  - Jerry Smith, Beth's husband
  - Space Beth Smith, a possible clone of Beth
  - 'Evil' Morty Smith, an alternate version of Morty
- Several characters in the Doctor Who universe:
  - Luke Smith (The Sarah Jane Adventures)
  - Mickey Smith
  - Sarah Jane Smith
  - Sky Smith
  - The Doctor himself also often goes by the alias of "John Smith"
- The otherwise unnamed Mr. Smith and Mrs. Smith in Mr. & Mrs. Smith (1996 TV series)
- David Smith and Ann Smith Mr. & Mrs. Smith (1941 film)
- John Smith and Jane Smith in Mr. & Mrs. Smith (2005 film)
- Stan Smith (American Dad!) and family, from American Dad!
  - Francine Smith, Hayley Smith (American Dad!), Steve Smith (American Dad!)
- Agent Smith in The Matrix
- Jefferson Smith in Mr. Smith Goes to Washington
- Leroy Smith, a character in the Tekken video game series
- Psmith in several humorous stories by P. G. Wodehouse
- Snuffy Smith, character in newspaper comic strip
- Tabitha Smith, a Marvel Comics character
- Valentine Michael Smith, the main character in Stranger in a Strange Land
- Winston Smith from Nineteen Eighty-Four

== See also ==
- List of taxonomic authorities named Smith
- Smiths of Glastonbury
- Smith Family (disambiguation), multiple people
