= R. Smith =

R. Smith may refer to:

- R. D. Hilton Smith (1903–1974), Canadian librarian
- R. Grant Smith (born 1939), American diplomat
- R. Harlan Smith (born 1939), Canadian country music singer
- R. Jeffrey Smith, Pulitzer Prize–winning American journalist
- R. K. Smith (born 1937), American stock car racing driver
- R. Thomas Smith or Tom Smith (1878–1957), American Thoroughbred racehorse trainer

== See also ==
- Randall Smith (disambiguation)
- Randy Smith (disambiguation)
- Ralph Smith (disambiguation)
- Rashad Smith (disambiguation)
- Ray Smith (disambiguation)
- Raymond Smith (disambiguation)
- R. B. Smith (disambiguation)
- Rebecca Smith (disambiguation)
- Red Smith (disambiguation)
- Regan Smith (disambiguation)
- Reginald Smith (disambiguation)
- Rex Smith (disambiguation)
- Richard Smith (disambiguation)
- Rick Smith (disambiguation)
- Ricky Smith (disambiguation)
- Robert Smith (disambiguation)
- Robin Smith (disambiguation)
- Rod Smith (disambiguation)
- Roger Smith (disambiguation)
- Ron Smith (disambiguation)
- Ronnie Smith (disambiguation)
- Ross Smith (disambiguation)
- Roy Smith (disambiguation)
- Rupert Smith (disambiguation)
- Russell Smith (disambiguation)
- Rusty Smith (disambiguation)
- Ruth Smith (disambiguation)
- Ryan Smith (disambiguation)
