= Ivor Smith =

Ivor Smith may refer to:

- Ivor Smith (architect) (1926–2018), English architect
- Ivor Smith (footballer) (born 1931), Australian rules footballer
