= Leah Smith =

Leah Smith may refer to:

- Leah King-Smith, Australian artist
- Leah Song (born Leah Smith), American singer-songwriter and musician
- Leah Smith (swimmer) (born 1995), American swimmer
- Leah M. Smith, Canadian biostatistician and cancer researcher
