= Joan Smith (disambiguation) =

Joan Smith is an English writer and activist.

Joan Smith may also refer to:

- Joan Smith (biathlete) (born 1967), American biathlete
- Joan Smith (politician) (1928–2016), Canadian politician
- Joan Irvine Smith (1933–2019), American philanthropist and environmental activist
- Joan Merriam Smith (died 1965), American aviator, winner of the Harmon Trophy

== See also ==
- Joan Spencer-Smith (1891–1965), New Zealand deaconess and lecturer
- Sheila Joan Smith, British professor of immunology
- Red Joan, a 2018 British spy thriller about a Soviet spy named Joan Smith
- List of people with surname Smith
