= Sgt. Smith =

Sgt. Smith, Sergeant Smith, or variation, may refer to:

== People ==
Sgt Smith, rank

- Edward Smith (VC) (1898–1940) Victoria Cross recipient for action during WWI
- Elmelindo Rodrigues Smith (1935–1967) Medal of Honor recipient for action during the Vietnam War
- Henry Robert Smith, former Sergeants-at-Arms of the Canadian House of Commons
- Jimmie Todd Smith (born 1965) retired Staff Sergeant and Florida politician
- John Smith (sergeant) (1814–1864) Victoria Cross recipient for the Siege of Delhi.
- Larry Smith, former Sergeant at Arms of the United States Senate
- Maynard Harrison Smith (1911–1984) Medal of Honor recipient for a bombing raid over France.
- Paul Ray Smith (1969–2003) Medal of Honor recipient for Operation Iraqi Freedom.
- Sam Smith (painter) (1918–1999) U.S. Army artist technical sergeant during WWII
- Sean Smith (diplomat) (1978–2012) who left the USAF as a staff sergeant, to enter the foreign service
- William Thomas Smith DCM MM (1896–1994) WWI flying ace

Sergeant Smith, name

- Seargent Smith Prentiss (1808–1850) Mississippi politician

== Fictional characters ==
- Detective Sergeant Chad Smith, a character from The Smith Family (TV series)
- Dale Smith (The Bill), a character from The Bill who progressed from constable to inspector, serving time as sergeant

== See also ==
- Smith (surname)
- List of people with surname Smith
- Smith (disambiguation)
