= Ira Smith =

Ira Smith may refer to:

- Ira Smith (baseball) (born 1967), American baseball player
- Ira Smith (announcer), American public address announcer
- Ira E. Smith (1864–1948), Wisconsin state politician
- Ira Harvey Smith (1815–1883), Kansas state politician
- Ira P. Smith (1832–1904), Wisconsin state politician
