= Kent Smith (disambiguation) =

Kent Smith (1907–1985) was an American actor.

Kent Smith may also refer to:

- Kent Smith (American politician) (born 1966), American politician in the Ohio House of Representatives
- Kent Smith (Canadian politician), Canadian politician in the Nova Scotia House of Assembly
- Kent Smith (producer), Australian cinematographer and film producer

== See also ==
- List of people with surname Smith
- Smith (disambiguation)
- Smith (surname)
