= Andrea Smith =

Andrea Smith may refer to:

- Andrea Smith (academic) (born 1966), intellectual, feminist, and anti-violence activist
- Andrea Smith (diplomat), New Zealand diplomat and politician
