= Vernon Smith =

Vernon or Vern Smith may refer to:

- Vernon Smith (bishop) (1880–1957), English bishop
- Vern Smith (journalist) (1892–?), American left-wing journalist
- Vernon C. Smith (1892–1963), American politician from Virginia
- Vernon B. Smith (1894–1969), American regional artist
- Vernon Smith (American football) (1908–1988), American football, basketball, and baseball player and coach
- Vernon L. Smith (born 1927), American economist
- Vernon Smith (Indiana politician) (born 1944)
- Vernon Smith (basketball) (1958–1992), American basketball player
- Vern Smith (ice hockey) (born 1964), Canadian ice hockey defenceman
- Vernon K. Smith (died 1966), Idaho politician
- Vernon Smith (screenwriter) (active 1924–1951), writer of American films
