= Norman Smith =

Norman or Norm Smith may refer to:

== Arts ==
- Norman Smith (journalist) (born 1959), British BBC journalist
- Norman Smith (record producer) (1923–2008), English musician, record producer and engineer
- Norman Kemp Smith (1872–1958), Scottish philosopher

== Government and politics ==
- N. Randy Smith (born 1949), federal judge on the United States Court of Appeals for the Ninth Circuit
- Norm Smith (American politician) (born 1947), member of the Oregon House of Representatives
- Norm Smith (Australian politician) (1901–1983), member of the Queensland Legislative Assembly
- Norman Smith (mayor) (1919-1993), British Labour Party politician and mayor of Lewisham
- Norman Smith (MP for Nottingham South) (1890–1962), British Labour Party politician
- Norman Lockhart Smith (1887–1968), British colonial administrator
- Norman H. Smith (born 1933), United States Marine Corps general

== Sports ==
- Norm Smith (1915–1973), Australian rules football player and coach
- Norm Smith (footballer, born 1946), Australian rules footballer
- Norm Smith (rugby union), rugby union player who represented Australia
- Normie Smit (1908–1988), Canadian ice hockey player
- Norman Smith (footballer, born September 1897) (1897–1978), footballer for Charlton Athletic and Queens Park Rangers
- Norman Smith (footballer, born December 1897) (1897–1978), footballer for Huddersfield Town, Sheffield Wednesday and Queens Park Rangers, and later manager of Newcastle United
- Norman Smith (South African soccer) (born 1982), South African footballer for Jomo Cosmos
- Norman Leslie Smith (1890–1958), Australian motor racing driver

== See also ==
- List of people with surname Smith
