= Dale Smith =

Dale Smith may refer to:

- Dale Smith (poet) (born 1967), American poet, editor, and critic
- Dale Smith (writer) (born 1976), playwright and author known for his work on Doctor Who spin-offs
- Dale Smith (The Bill), fictional character on the television series The Bill
- Dale Smith (cowboy) (1928–2017), multiple time Team roping world champion
- Dale Smith (politician) (1937–2016), American politician
- Dale L. Smith, American political scientist

== See also ==
- List of people with surname Smith
