= Cecil Smith =

Cecil Smith may refer to:

== Arts and entertainment ==
- Cecil Smith (writer) (1917–2009), television and theatre critic, television host, journalist, screenwriter, and World War II bomber pilot
- R. Cecil Smith (1880–1922), American screenwriter

== Politicians and civil servants ==
- Cecil Smith (Auditor General), Auditor General of Sri Lanka
- Cecil Smith (politician) (1927–1988), Manitoba member of Canadian Parliament
- Cecil Clementi Smith (1840–1916), British colonial administrator

== Sports ==
- Cecil Smith (figure skater) (1908–1997), Canadian figure skater
- Cecil Smith (footballer, born 1904) (1904–1977), Welsh footballer
- Cecil Smith (footballer, born 1907) (1907–1990), English footballer
- Cecil Smith (polo) (1904–1999), American polo player
- Cecil Smith (track and field) (1936-2016), athletics coach and builder, publisher

== Others ==
- Cecil Harcourt Smith (1859–1944), British archaeologist and museum director
- Edward Cecil-Smith (1903-1963), Canadian Communist

== See also ==
- Cecil Woodham-Smith (1896–1977), British historian and biographer
- Cecil Humphery-Smith (1928–2021), British genealogist and heraldist
