= Janet Smith =

Janet Smith may refer to:

- Janet Smith (dancer), British dancer, choreographer and college principal
- Janet Smith (judge) (born 1940), Lady Justice of Appeal of the Court of Appeal of England and Wales
- Janet Smith (Rhodesia) (1915–1994), wife of Ian Smith, Prime Minister of Rhodesia
- Janet Smith (runner) (1965–2025), American long-distance runner
- Janet Smith (sprinter) (born 1968), British Olympic sprinter
- Janet Adam Smith (1905–1999), Scottish writer, editor, and literary journalist
- Janet E. Smith (born 1950), American professor of moral theology
- Janet Kennedy Smith (1902–1924), Scottish-born Canadian murder victim in the Janet Smith case
- Janet L. Smith (born 1951), American scientist
- Janet Marie Smith (born 1957), American MLB executive, architect, and urban planner
- Janet Marilyn Smith (1966–1994), American woman killed in the 1994 Gresham cat hostage taking incident
- Janet Seymour-Smith (1930–1998), English translator and scholar

== Fictional characters ==
- Janet Smith, fictional character in Two Pints of Lager and a Packet of Crisps
