= Tara Smith =

Tara Smith may refer to:

- Tara Bray Smith (born 1970), Hawaiian author
- Tara C. Smith, American epidemiologist
- Tara Smith (philosopher) (born 1961), Objectivist philosopher
- Tara Smith (water polo), British water polo player in the 2003 FINA Women's World Water Polo Championship Squads
