= Victor Smith (disambiguation) =

Victor Smith (1913–1998) was a senior officer within the Royal Australian Navy.

Victor Smith may also refer to:

- Victor Smith (English footballer) (1878–1951), footballer with Southampton
- Alfred Victor Smith (1891–1915), English recipient of the Victoria Cross
- Victor Lewis-Smith, British satirist
- Vic Coppersmith-Heaven (born Victor Smith), English sound engineer and record producer
- Vic Smith, New Zealand international football (soccer) player
- Vic Smith (Australian footballer) (1893–1972), Australian rules footballer
- Victor Emmanuel Smith, Ghanaian diplomat and politician
