= R. B. Smith =

R. B. Smith may refer to:

- Richard Bernhard Smith (1901-1935), American songwriter
- Richard Baird Smith (1818-1861), British engineer officer in the East India Company
- Richard Bowyer Smith (1837-1919), English-born Australian inventor

== See also ==
- List of people with the surname Smith#R
