= Tyson Smith =

Tyson Smith may refer to:

- Tyson Smith (American football) (born 1981), American former football linebacker
- Tyson Smith (born 1983), professional wrestler under the ring name Kenny Omega

== See also ==
- Herbert Tyson Smith English sculptor
- Stuart Tyson Smith, Egyptologist
