= Sherri Smith =

Sherri Smith may refer to:

- Sherri Smith (artist) (born 1943), American fiber artist and educator
- Sherri L. Smith (fl. 2000s–2010s), American writer
- Sherri Smith Buffington (fl. 2000s–2010s), American politician in Louisiana

== See also ==
- Sherry Smith (1891–1949), American MLB baseball player
