= Guy Smith =

Guy Smith may refer to:

== Sports ==
- Guy Smith (ice hockey, born 1892) (1892–1951), Canadian professional ice hockey player
- Guy Smith (baseball), American baseball player
- Guy Smith (ice hockey, born 1950), Canadian former professional ice hockey player
- Guy Smith (racing driver) (born 1974), English racing driver
- Guy Smith (footballer) (born 1996), Dutch footballer

== Others ==
- Guy Vernon Smith (bishop) (1880–1957), Anglican bishop
- Guy D. Smith (1907–1981), American soil scientist
- Guy N. Smith (1939-2020), English writer
- Guy Smith (writer) (born 1957), based in San Francisco
- Guy Smith, producer of the British television series The Conspiracy Files

== See also ==
- Mister Sensitive (real name Guy Smith), a fictional character from Marvel Comics
- Guy Smit, Dutch footballer
