= Zoe Smith (disambiguation) =

Zoe Smith is an English weightlifter.

Zoe Smith may also refer to:

- Zoe Smith (badminton), see U.S. National Badminton Championships
- Zoe Tuckwell-Smith, Australian actress
