= Martha Smith (disambiguation) =

Martha Smith (born 1952) is an American model. Martha Smith may also refer to:

- Martha K. Smith (fl. 1960s–2010s), American mathematician
- Martha Nell Smith (fl. 1990s–2010s), professor of English
- Martha Pearson Smith (1836-?), American poet, musician, temperance activist

== See also ==
- Yeardley Smith (full name Martha Maria Yeardley Smith), American actress, writer and artist
