= Melanie Smith =

Melanie Smith may refer to:

- Melanie George Smith (born 1972), American politician
- Melanie Smith (actress) (born 1962), American actress
- Melanie Smith (equestrian) (born 1949), American Olympic equestrian
- Melanie Smith (artist) (born 1965), English artist living in Mexico
