= Ivor Smith (footballer) =

Australian rules footballer

Personal information
- Full name: Ivor Smith
- Born: 24 July 1931 (age 95)
- Original team: Caulfield
- Height: 185 cm (6 ft 1 in)
- Weight: 83 kg (183 lb)

Playing career^{1}
Years	Club	Games (Goals)
1952–54	St Kilda	13 (0)
- ^{1} Playing statistics correct to the end of 1954.

Ivor Smith (born 24 July 1931) is a former Australian rules footballer who played with St Kilda in the Victorian Football League (VFL).
