= Violet Smith (disambiguation) =

Violet Smith is a former jockey.

Violet Smith may also refer to:

- Violet Smith, character in the Sherlock Holmes short story "The Adventure of the Solitary Cyclist"
- Violet Smith, character in the film If I Had a Million
