= Captain Smith =

Captain Smith may refer to:

- Captain Edward Smith (1850–1912) of the RMS Titanic
- Captain John Smith of Jamestown (1580–1631)
- Captain Roy Campbell Smith (1858–1940), Governor of Guam
