= Tracy Smith =

Tracy Smith may refer to:

- Tracy Smith (runner) (born 1945)
- Tracy Smith (long jumper) (born 1964)
- Tracy Smith (baseball) (born 1966), college baseball coach
- Tracy Smith (journalist) (born 1968)
- Tracy K. Smith (born 1972), American Poet Laureate and educator
- Tracy Smith (American football), American football coach
- Tracy Smith Malone, American church bishop
- Tracey Smith, a character from the television series Firefly
