= Leroy Smith =

Leroy Smith may refer to:

- LeRoy Smith (1933–2002), American college football coach
- Leroy Smith (activist) (19111989) American activist and entrepreneur
- Leroy Smith (American football) (born 1969), American college football player for the University of Iowa
- Leroy Smith (basketball) (born 1980), American basketball player
- Stuff Smith (1909–1967), American jazz violinist
- Leroy Smith, member of British soul band Sweet Sensation
- Leroy Smith, a fictional character from the Tekken series video game
