= Winston Smith =

Winston Smith may refer to:

== People ==
- Winston Smith (artist) (born 1952), American artist
- Winston Smith (athlete) (born 1982), Olympic track and field athlete
- Winston Boogie Smith (born 1988 or 1989), American man killed by law enforcement in 2021
- Winston Smith, a co-host of The Political Cesspool

== Fictional people ==
- Winston Smith (Nineteen Eighty-Four), protagonist in George Orwell's novel Nineteen Eighty-Four.
- Winston Smith (Tomb Raider), fictional butler in a video game series
- Winston Smith, the carpenter in the 2018 video game Return of the Obra Dinn.

== Other ==
- Winston Smith Project, human rights movement
