= Perry Smith =

Perry Smith may refer to:

- Perry Smith (politician) (1783–1852), American congressman, Connecticut
- Perry Edward Smith (1928–1965), murderer depicted in the book In Cold Blood
- Perry Smith (American football) (born 1951), NFL defensive back
- Perry H. Smith (1828–1885), judge, politician and railroad executive
- Perry M. Smith (born 1934), Air Force major general who was a military analyst for CNN
- Perry G. Smith Sr., adjutant general in Alabama
