= Pamela Smith (disambiguation) =

Lady Pamela Smith (1914–1982) was an English socialite. Pamela Smith may also refer to:

- Pamela A. Smith (born 1968), American police chief
- Pamela Colman Smith (1878–1951), British illustrator and occultist
- Pamela H. Smith (fl. 1970s–2020s), American historian of science

== See also ==
- Pam Smith (fl. 1970s–2020s), British nurse and professor
