= Curt Smith (disambiguation) =

Curt Smith is an English musician and member of Tears for Fears.

Curt Smith or Curtis Smith may also refer to:

- Curtis P. Smith (1863–1919), attorney, civic leader and mayor of Dallas
- Curt Smith (author) (born 1951), American author and speechwriter
- Curt Smith (baseball) (born 1986), Dutch baseball player
- Curt Smith (basketball) (born 1971), American basketball player
- Curtis Smith (drag racer) (fl. 1970s–2010s), NHRA and IHRA drag racer

Curtis-Smith may refer to:

- Anne Curtis (born Anne Curtis-Smith, 1985), Filipino-Australian actress
- C. Curtis-Smith (1941–2014), American composer and pianist
- Jasmine Curtis-Smith (born 1994), Filipino-Australian actress

== See also ==
- Curtismith (born 1993), Filipino singer
- Kurtwood Smith (sometimes called "Kurt"; born 1943), American actor
- Smith Curtis (1855–1949), Canadian lawyer and political figure
