= Shirley Smith =

Shirley Smith may refer to:

- Mum (Shirl) Smith (1924–1998), Aboriginal Australian social work and activist
- Shirley Smith (politician), member of the Ohio Senate
- Shirley Smith (lawyer) (1916–2007), New Zealand lawyer
- Hubert Shirley-Smith (1901–1981), British civil engineer
