= Bud Smith (disambiguation) =

Bud Smith (born 1979), is an American baseball player.

Bud Smith may also refer to:

- Bud Smith (British Columbia politician) (born 1946), Canadian politician in British Columbia
- Bud Smith (Saskatchewan politician) (1919–2002), Canadian politician in Saskatchewan
- Bud S. Smith (1935–2024), American film editor
- Martin V. Smith (1916–2001), Oxnard, California developer and philanthropist, known as "Bud" Smith
- Wallace Smith (boxer) (1924–1973), American world lightweight boxing champion in 1955

== See also ==
- Buddy Smith, comic character
