= Marva Smith =

Marva J. Smith, QC was appointed to the Provincial Court of Manitoba on October 28, 1999.

== Law career ==
Smith obtained her law degree from the University of Manitoba in 1976, earning the University of Manitoba Faculty of Law gold medal. She also has a Master of Laws degree from the University of London (London School of Economics) in England. She practiced law for 21 years, including six years in private practice, three years as a consultant in labour relations and pay equity with Manitoba Labour and 13 years with the Constitutional Law Branch of Manitoba Justice.

Smith served as an assistant professor at the Faculty of Law at the University of Manitoba for two years and has been involved in a variety of community organizations, including the Robert A. Steen Community Centre board, the Westminster Tot Lot board and the Community Unemployed Help Centre. She also served as senior counsel with the federal Department of Justice and as vice-president of the Manitoba branch of the Canadian Bar Association. She has handled both criminal law and civil matters at all court levels, including cases involving issues such as domestic violence, gangs and the sexual assault of children.

== Personal life ==
In 2010, Smith's adopted daughter Jessica was sentenced for using pepper spray to commit two robberies in Manitoba; due to Smith's judicial position, sentencing was carried out in the neighboring province of Saskatchewan.
