= Gavin Smith =

Gavin Smith may refer to:

- Gavin Smith (poker player) (1968–2019), Canadian professional poker player
- Gavin Smith (author), science fiction writer who collaborates with Stephen Deas as Gavin Deas
- Gavin Smith (racing driver) (born 1977), auto racing driver
- Gavin Smith (footballer, born 1915) (1915–1992), footballer for Dumbarton and Barnsley
- Gavin Smith (film studio executive) (1954–2014), American actor, film studio executive, and basketball player
- Gavin Smith (Australian footballer) (1948–1995), Australian rules footballer
