= Doctor Smith =

Doctor Smith may refer to:

== People ==
- Bob Smith (doctor) (1879–1950), co-founded Alcoholics Anonymous
- E. E. Smith (1890–1965), also known as Doc Smith, early science fiction writer

== Fictional entities ==
- Dr. Zachary Smith, a fictional character from Lost in Space
- Doctor, a fictional character from Doctor Who

== See also ==
- Smith (surname)
