= Clyde Smith =

Clyde Smith may refer to:

- Clyde B. Smith (1906–1976), American football player, coach, and college athletics administrator
- Clyde H. Smith (1876–1940), United States Representative from Maine
- Clyde E. Smith (1897–1971), Justice of the Supreme Court of Texas
- Clyde Smith (American football) (1904–1982), American football center in the National Football League
- Clyde Smith (footballer) (1901–1935), Australian rules footballer
- Clyde Smith (baseball), American baseball player
