= Lester Smith =

Lester Smith may refer to:

- Lester Smith (Canadian football)
- Lester W. Smith, creator of Dragon Dice and other dice games
- Lester Smith (swimmer)
- L. Neil Smith, Libertarian science fiction author and political activist
- Lester Smith (philanthropist) (1942-2019), American oil executive and philanthropist
