= Clifton Smith =

Clifton Smith may refer to:

- Clifton Smith (return specialist) (born 1985), American football running back and return specialist
- Clifton Smith (linebacker) (born 1980), American football linebacker for the Washington Redskins, Cleveland Browns and Chicago Rush
