= Neville Smith =

Neville Smith may refer to:

- Neville Smith (actor), British screenwriter and actor
- Neville Smith (rugby league), Australian rugby league footballer
