= Leighton Smith =

Leighton Smith may refer to:

- Lawrence Leighton Smith (1936–2013), American conductor and pianist
- Leighton Smith (radio host) (born 1947), Australia-born New Zealand radio broadcaster
- Leighton W. Smith Jr. (1939–2023), American admiral
