= Owen Smith (disambiguation) =

Owen Smith (born 1970) is a British politician.

Owen Smith may refer to:

- Owen Smith (physician), Irish haematologist and academic
- Owen Smith (racing driver) (born 2000), American racing driver
- Owen Smith (sprinter), Welsh sprinter
- Owen H.M. Smith (born 1973), American television producer, writer, actor and comedian
- Owen Smith (table tennis), played table tennis at the 2010 Summer Youth Olympics
- Owen L. W. Smith, United States Ambassador to Liberia

== See also ==
- Tuppy Owen-Smith (1909–1990), South African cricketer
- C. E. Owen Smyth (1851–1925), South Australian public servant
