= Julie Smith =

Julie or Julia Smith may refer to:

== Actresses ==
- Julie Anne Smith (born 1960), birth name of American actress Julianne Moore
- Julie K. Smith (born 1967), American adult film actress
- Julie Smith (actress), British actress during 1990s and 2000s, a/k/a Julia Lee Smith

== Sportswomen ==
- Julie Smith (softball) (born 1968), American Olympian
- Julie Smith (athlete) (born 1982), Australian Paralympian
- Julie Smith (footballer), Scottish footballer

== Writers ==
- Julia Evelina Smith (1792–1886), American women's suffrage activist and author
- Julia Holmes Smith (1839–1930), American physician, writer and publisher
- Julia Smith (composer) (1905–1989), American composer, pianist and writer on music
- Julia Smith (producer) (1927–1997), English television director, writer and producer
- Julie Smith (novelist) (born 1944), American mystery writer
- Julia M. H. Smith (born 1956), English professor of medieval history
- Julie Smith, Baroness Smith of Newnham (born 1969), English politician and lecturer at Cambridge

== Others ==
- Julia Murdock Smith (1831–1880), American member of Latter Day Saint movement
- Julia Smith Gibbons (born 1950), née Smith, United States circuit judge
- Julie Smith (Miss Alabama) (born 1975/76), American beauty pageant winner
- Julianne Smith, known as Julie, American foreign policy advisor and diplomat to NATO in 2021
- Julia Smith, a figure in the 1872 Kelsey Outrage

== Characters ==
- Juley Smith, portrayed by Joseph Kpobie on EastEnders from 2002 to 2006

== See also ==
- Julia Abel Smith, British historian and historical preservationist
