= Otis Smith =

Otis Smith may refer to:

- Otis Smith (American football), American football player
- Otis Smith (basketball), American basketball player
- Otis Smith (tennis), American tennis player
- Otis M. Smith, justice on the Michigan Supreme Court
