= Alana Smith =

Alana Smith may refer to:

- Alana Smith (tennis) (born 1999)
- Alana Smith (skateboarder) (born 2000)
- Alanna Smith (born 1996), basketball player

== See also ==
- Alan Smith (disambiguation)
