= Sally Smith =

Sally Smith is the name of:

- Sally Smith, the slave name of the West-African woman Redoshi (d. 1937)
- Sally Smith (actress) (born 1942), British actress
- Sally Smith (politician) (born 1945), American politician
- Sally Bedell Smith (born 1948), American historian and author
- Sally E. Smith, Australian mycologist
- Sally J. Smith, American businesswoman
- Sally J. Smith, American artist
- Sally Liberman Smith (1929–2007), American educator
- Sally Merchant (1919–2007), née Smith, Canadian television personality and political figure
- Sally James (presenter) (born 1950), British TV presenter, married name Smith
- Sally Smith (runner), American middle-distance runner, 1988 All-American for the Purdue Boilermakers track and field team
- Sally Smith (writer), shortlisted for 2025 CWA Historical Dagger
