= Shannon Smith =

Shannon Smith may refer to:

== Sportspeople ==
- Shannon Smith (lacrosse), American lacrosse coach and player
- Shannon Smith (marksman), U.S. sport shooter in the USPSA Handgun Championship
- Shannon Smith (swimmer), Canadian competition swimmer
- Shannon Smith (runner), winner of the 2001 3000 meters at the NCAA Division I Indoor Track and Field Championships

== Fictional characters ==
- Shannon Smith, fictional character in Mankillers

== Others ==
- Shannon Smith, gunshot victim whose death led to Shannon's law
- Shannon Smith, musician in The Imperials
- Shannon M. Smith, maiden name of Shannon M. Kent, U.S. Navy Chief Petty Officer KIA Manbij, Syria 2018

== See also ==
- Shannon Smyth, soccer player and coach
