= Glen Smith =

Glen(n) Smith may refer to:

- Glen Smith (basketball) (1928–2019), American basketball player
- Glen Smith (cricketer) (born 1973), Bermudian cricketer
- Glen Smith (discus thrower) (born 1972), English discus thrower
- Glen Smith (ice hockey) (1931–1999), Canadian ice hockey player
- Glen Smith (racing driver), American racing driver in 1984 24 Hours of Le Mans
- Glenn Smith (1895–1949), ice hockey player
- Glenn W. Smith (born 1953), author, activist and political consultant
- Glen R. Smith, U.S. farmer and businessman

== See also ==
- Dee Glen Smith Spectrum, a multi-purpose arena on the campus of Utah State University
