= Lenny Smith =

American musician

Leonard Smith
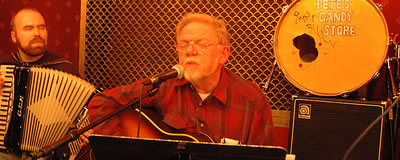

Background information
- Also known as: Lenny Smith
- Born: Leonard Earl Smith Jr. August 29, 1942 (age 83); Philadelphia, Pennsylvania, United States
- Genres: gospel, folk, pop, contemporary Christian
- Occupations: Musician, singer, songwriter, music publisher
- Instruments: Guitar, voice
- Years active: 1965–present
- Label: Great Comfort Records
- Website: greatcomfortrecords.com

Leonard Smith (born August 29, 1942) is an American singer, songwriter, and music publisher.

His style of gospel-centered songs range from pop to folk to gospel. Smith is best known in Christian music circles for writing the international worship standard "Our God Reigns" in 1973.

== Early life and education ==
Leonard Earl Smith Jr. was born in 1942 in Philadelphia, Pennsylvania, at the Naval Hospital. He is the only son and second child of a career military father (U.S. Marine Corps) and a Catholic mother. Their family moved frequently, living in Philadelphia, Virginia, California, North Carolina, Guam, and finally settled in South Jersey.

Smith was raised Protestant even though his mother was a devout Catholic. His mother Marie would attend mass each Sunday but drop her three children off at the local Protestant church at the insistence of her non-religious husband. When he was 12, his father left the family, and he started to attend the Catholic church with his mother. He became fascinated by Catholicism and entered the seminary after high school to study for the priesthood in 1960.

In 1960, Smith left New Jersey and entered Jordan Evangelical Theological Seminary in Menominee, Michigan. He then attended Mount St. Paul Seminary in Waukesha, Wisconsin. His last four years of study were spent at Mount Saint Mary's Seminary in Emmitsburg, MD., where he studied for the Catholic priesthood. He received his B.A. degree in Classical Philosophy in 1965. He pursued a master's in English Literature at Villanova, but never completed it.

In 1968, Smith left the seminary and taught high school at Paul VI High School in Haddon Township, NJ. He was a guidance counselor for the freshman class. At the end of the year, he was asked to leave; the reason given by the principal was a strained working relationship. Earlier in the year, a freshman girl's grades dropped from straight A's to D's and Lenny called her into his office to see what was going on. After finding out that the girl was being sexually abused by the science teacher, Smith addressed the issue with the principal, forcing him to dismiss the science teacher. At the end of the year, Smith was also dismissed.

In 1969, Smith taught religion at Gloucester Catholic High School in Gloucester, NJ. He enjoyed this, but wanted to teach at a public school, so the following year he taught Latin and English at Cinnaminson High School in Cinnaminson, NJ.

He went back to painting houses and eventually expanded to remodeling and building houses. For the next 35 years, he worked on houses by day, writing songs at night and leading worship on Sundays at various churches.

== Music career ==
=== Early career ===
In 1965, at Mount Saint Mary's Seminary, Smith started writing songs for the guitar masses that were being introduced at the seminary. The first song he wrote was called, "The New Jerusalem". He introduced several songs in the chapel. In 1967, Smith left the seminary, but continued to lead mass at different Catholic churches.

In 1969, Smith and his wife Marian became involved in the Catholic Charismatic Movement, which involved expressive worship, dancing, and speaking in tongues. In 1970, they attended a Protestant Charismatic Church in Philadelphia called The Gospel Temple, which was a multi-cultural church led by Pastor John Poole. An off-shoot was formed in New Jersey called, the "Living Word Community", where Smith led worship for two years. Smith resigned over concerns about the church's embrace of the doctrine and practice of "shepherding", also called "discipling". This pyramid-like leadership model later collapsed.

=== Our God Reigns ===
In 1973, Smith was out of work and mildly depressed. One morning he read Isaiah 52:7 from the Bible, "How lovely on the mountains are the feet of him who brings good news...." He was so moved and encouraged by the passage that he wrote "Our God Reigns" in five minutes—one verse and the chorus.

Bob Mumford, a traveling evangelist, visited The Living Word in NJ and heard Smith sing "Our God Reigns." Mumford loved the song and taught it at each church and conference he visited all over the world during the next couple of years. An Australian company, Scripture in Song, released a songbook 1979 called "Scripture in Song Volume I" which included two of Smith's songs—"Our God Reigns" (which they entitled "How Lovely on the Mountains") and "City O City". This songbook was sold and brought world-wide attention to these songs. A Catholic Prayer community in Ann Arbor, MI. also released a songbook and album which brought much attention to the song.

"Our God Reigns" became very popular in England. A pastor in England decided to add additional Scripture verses to the song, which at the time only had one verse. Smith contacted him, asking him not to add additional verses and the pastor insisted he would anyway. To this day, in the UK the version of "Our God Reigns" is known with the pastor's additional verses. This motivated Smith to write the next four verses which took a couple of years to finish. "Our God Reigns" is still being used and circulated today around the world. It has been recorded on over 55 albums and printed in 35 songbooks and hymnals and exists in over 20 languages.

Many popular Christian artists have covered "Our God Reigns" including Phil Driscoll, Evie Tornquist, John Michael Talbot, The Gaithers, Dana, LifeWay, and Word. In 2010, "Our God Reigns" was sung during the Papal Mass for Pope Benedict XVI in Bellahouston Park. It was a favorite of Pope John Paul II and was used during his visit in 1999 to North America and during a few of his convocations in South America.

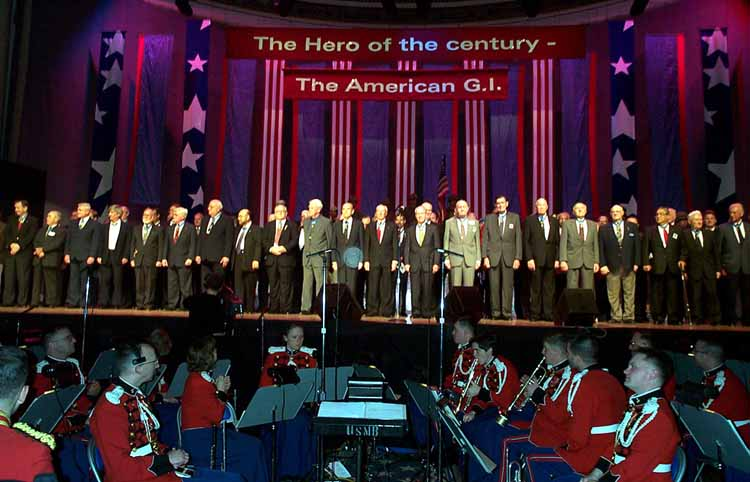
In 2010, "Our God Reigns" was sung for the Papal Procession at Bellahouston Park in Glasgow, Scotland.

=== Papal Procession ===
In 2010, "Our God Reigns" was sung for the Papal Procession at Bellahouston Park in Glasgow, Scotland. Evie also sang the song at a Papal Mass in the UK.

=== Broadening His Ministry ===
In 1969, Smith became involved with the Catholic Charismatics. He would intermingle with the Protestant Charismatics and the Pentecostals at this time because the groups were interested in the same things. He visited The Gospel Temple, a Protestant charismatic church in Philadelphia, and that became his church home for the next several years.

== Musical style ==
Smith is known for his smooth voice and his folk-style guitar playing. His songs are an equal mix of country/folk/and rock filled with scripture and are known for their simplicity, singability, and joy. Smith plays a 1969 Gibson J-45 guitar that he bought brand-new in 1969.

== Personal life ==
Smith married his wife Marian in 1970. He and Marian have five children – Daniel, Rachel, Megan, David, and Andrew. Their oldest son Daniel formed the band "Danielson Famile" or "Danielson" in which all five children perform. Daniel also started a record label called Sounds Familyre Records. Their eldest daughter Rachel also writes and records worship music on Great Comfort Records.

After retiring from carpentry, he is still working with his music and his label Great Comfort Records and his publishing company New Jerusalem Music.

== Discography ==
=== Albums ===
Leonard Smith Albums
ALBUMS	YEAR	RECORD LABEL	PRODUCER
Deep Calls To Deep	Oct. 2001	Great Comfort Records	Daniel C. Smith
Who Was And Is And Is To Come	Jan. 2013	Great Comfort Records	Daniel C. Smith
You Are My Hiding Place	Nov. 2016	Great Comfort Records	Daniel C. Smith
