= Leah M. Smith =

Canadian biostatistician

Leah M. Smith is a Canadian biostatistician affiliated with the Canadian Cancer Society and known for her work on the effectiveness and safety of HPV vaccines. She is the 2020 winner of the Lise Manchester Award, given annually by the Statistical Society of Canada in recognition of "excellence in statistical research that helps guide public policy in Canada".

After studying psychology at the Memorial University of Newfoundland, Smith earned a master's degree in epidemiology in 2010 from Queen's University at Kingston, and completed her PhD in 2014 at McGill University. She returned to Queen's University for postdoctoral research before joining the Canadian Cancer Society in 2015.

Beyond her work on the HPV vaccine, Smith has participated in studies on screening for colorectal cancer and the prevalence of cancer more generally in the Canadian population,
