= Des Smith =

Des or Desmond Smith may refer to:

- Desmond Smith (Canadian Army officer) (1911–1991), Canadian major-general
- Des Smith (headteacher), British headteacher
- Des Smith (ice hockey) (1914–1981), Canadian ice hockey defenceman

== See also ==
- Des Smyth, Irish golfer
