= Virginia Smith =

Virginia Smith may refer to:

- Virginia B. Smith (1923–2010), president of Vassar College
- Virginia Smith (politician) (1911–2006), U.S. representative from Nebraska
- Virginia Thrall Smith (1836–1903), American children's advocate
- Virginia Smith Converter Station, near Sidney, Nebraska
