= Melvin Smith =

Melvin Smith may refer to:

- Mel Smith (1952–2013), English comedian, actor, film director, writer, and producer
- Mel Smith (Canadian football) (born 1949), Canadian football player
- Melvin H. Smith (1934–2001), British Columbia lawyer and expert on the Canadian constitution
