= Reverend Smith =

Reverend Smith may refer to:

People

- George Smith (chaplain) (1845–1918), Army chaplain, defender of Rorke's Drift during the Zulu War of 1879
- Gordon V. Smith (1906-1997), Episcopal Church bishop in the United States
- Henry Weston Smith (1827–1876) of Deadwood
- John Smith Moffat (1835–1918), British missionary and imperial agent in southern Africa
- Jonathan Smith Green (1796–1878), missionary from New England to the Kingdom of Hawaii
- William Smith (1707–1784), supporter of the American Revolution

Fiction

- The Reverend James Smith, character in Things Fall Apart

== See also ==
- Smith (surname)
