= Murray Smith =

Murray Smith may refer to:

- Murray Smith (Alberta politician), Canadian lawyer and politician, member of the Legislative Assembly of Alberta, 1993–2004
- Murray Smith (Canadian politician) (1930–2010), MP for Winnipeg North, 1958–1962
- Murray Smith (New Zealand politician), United Future New Zealand Party politician & MP, 2002–2005
- Murray Smith (writer) (1940–2003), British TV writer and producer
- Murray Robert Smith (1941–2009), New Zealand Labour Party politician & MP
- Robert Murray Smith (1831–1921), known as Murray Smith, politician in colonial Victoria, Australia
- Murray Smith (philosopher and film theorist), British professor of film studies and philosopher at the University of Kent

== See also ==
- Joanna Murray-Smith (born 1962), Australian author
- Stephen Murray-Smith (1922–1988), Australian writer, father of Joanna
