= Ty Smith =

Ty Smith may refer to:

- Ty Smith (drummer) (born 1977), American studio and internationally touring drummer
- Ty Smith (ice hockey) (born 2000), Canadian professional ice hockey defenceman

== See also ==
- Tye Smith (born 1993), American football cornerback
