= Nicol Smith (writer) =

American journalist

Nicol Smith was an American writer who wrote of his travels during the 1930s and 1940s. His works include Burma Road: The Story of the World's Most Romantic Highway, Black Martinique...Red Guiana, Into Siam: Underground Kingdom, and Golden Doorway to Tibet.

When Nicol Smith was 29 years old, he decided to attempt to drive the Burma road, but the Chinese government forbade it because they considered the road to be their private military secret. He also chose to attempt this feat during the wet season when roads were nearly impassable. Nevertheless, he succeeded. His book, Burma Road: The Story of the World's Most Romantic Highway, tells of his travels from British Burma through the mountain wilderness of Yunnan in 1939. Later during WWII, Nicol was a member of OSS Detachment 101. This Presidential Citation unit was charged with opening the Burma Road under Japanese occupation, thus providing access to China.

In the spring of 1941, Nicol Smith traveled to Martinique and French Guiana. He was the only American writer permitted to visit those colonies in 1941. On April 5, 1942, The New York Times printed a short piece on the subject of Smith's book, Black Martinique...Red Guiana.

In 1995, Sharon E. Karr wrote a biography of Nicol Smith's life titled Traveler of the Crossroads; The Life of Adventurer Nicol Smith.
