= Morgan Smith =

Morgan Smith may refer to:

== People ==
- Morgan Smith (rugby league) (born 1998), English rugby league footballer
- Morgan Lewis Smith (1822–1874), Union general in the American Civil War
- Morgan Smith (actress) (born 1985), American actress
- Morgan Smith (photographer) (1910–1993), New York photographer
- Amari Morgan-Smith (born 1989), English footballer
- Morgan Smith, known as Mista Mo, host of Buzz (TV series)

== Other ==
- S. Morgan Smith, American turbine manufacturing company
