= May Smith =

May Smith may refer to:

- May Smith (textile designer) (1906–1988), painter, engraver, textile designer and textile printer
- May Smith (psychologist) (1879–1968), British psychologist
- Lady May Abel Smith (1906–1994), great-granddaughter of Queen Victoria
- May Aimée Smith (1886–1962), English painter
- May Smith, a character in Almost a Rescue
