= Brittany Smith =

Brittany Smith may refer to:

== People ==
- Brittany Smith (shot putter) (born 1991), American shot put and hammer thrower
- Brit Smith (born 1985), American singer with the real name Brittany Smith

== See also ==
- Brittany (name)
- Smith (surname)
