= Lance Smith =

Lance Smith may refer to:

- Lance Smith (American football) (born 1963), American National Football League player
- Lance L. Smith (born 1946), United States Air Force general
- Lance Smith (politician) (1910–2000), Rhodesian farmer and politician
