= Lonnie Smith =

Lonnie Smith may refer to:

- Lonnie Liston Smith (born 1940), American jazz, soul, and funk pianist
- Lonnie Smith (organist) (1942–2021), American organist
- Lonnie Smith (baseball) (born 1955), American baseball player
- Lonnie Smith (boxer) (born 1962), American boxer
- The plaintiff of Smith v. Allwright, landmark decision of the U.S. Supreme Court regarding voting rights and racial desegregation
