= Dwight Smith =

Dwight Smith may refer to:

- Dwight Smith (American football) (born 1978), American football player
- Dwight Smith (baseball) (1963-2022), former Major League baseball player
- Dwight Smith (basketball) (1945–1967), American basketball player
- Dwight Smith Jr. (born 1992), baseball player
- Dwight Morrell Smith (born 1931), chemistry professor and academic administrator
