= Wendy Smith =

Wendy Smith may refer to:

- Wendy Smith (singer), English singer and guitarist in the band Prefab Sprout
- Wendy Smith (politician), member of the Victorian Legislative Council
- Wendy Jo Smith, American rap-artist, singer, and comedian
- Wendy K. Smith, American business professor
- Dr. Wendy Smith (Seaquest DSV), one of the main characters of seaQuest DSV season 2

== See also ==
- Wendy Smith-Sly (born 1959), former British athlete
