= Zane Smith (disambiguation) =

Zane Smith (born 1999) is an American racing driver.

Zane Smith may refer to:

- Richard Zane Smith (born 1955), American sculptor
- Zane Smith (baseball) (born 1960), American baseball player
