= Hilda Smith =

Hilda Smith may refer to:

- Hilda Worthington Smith (1888–1984), American labor educator, social worker, and poet
- Kitty Lovell-Smith (born Hilda Kate Lovell-Smith; 1886–1973), New Zealand businesswoman and community organiser
- Hilda Smith (gymnast) (1909–1995), British gymnast and medalist at the 1928 Summer Olympics
- Hilda Aitken (born Hilda Smith; 1891–1987), members of the colonial parliament of Bermuda
