= Olive Smith (disambiguation) =

Olive Smith may refer to:

- Olive Smith, (1906–1993), Irish conductor
- Olive Smith (masseuse), (1880–1916), masseuse, Scottish Women's Hospitals for Foreign Service
- Olive Smith (cricketer), (1993–2014), Australian cricketer

== See also ==
- Olive Smith-Dorrien, (1881–1951) creator of hospital bag fund World War I
