= Jerome Smith =

Jerome Smith may refer to:

- Jerome V. C. Smith (1800–1879), American mayor of Boston, Massachusetts
- Jerome Smith (civil rights activist) (1939–2026), American civil rights activist
- Jerome Smith (musician) (1953–2000), American guitarist
- Jerome Smith (American football) (born 1991), American football player
- Jerry Smith (American football coach) (Jerome Anthony Smith, 1930–2011), American football player and coach
