= Bruce Smith (disambiguation) =

Bruce Smith (born 1963) is a retired American football player who holds the NFL record for most career quarterback sacks.

Bruce Smith may also refer to:

== Arts and entertainment ==
- Bruce Smith (poet) (born 1946), American poet
- Bruce Smith (musician) (born 1960), American drummer
- Bruce W. Smith (born 1961), African-American animator and television producer

== Law and politics ==
- Bruce Smith (Australian politician) (1851–1937)
- Bruce Lannes Smith (1909–1987), American political scientist
- Bruce I. Smith (born 1934), American politician in Pennsylvania
- Bruce Atherton Smith (1937–2006), Canadian politician in New Brunswick
- Bruce Smith (Ontario politician) (fl. 1990s), Canadian politician
- S. Bruce Smith (1899–1984), Canadian lawyer and judge

== Sports ==
- Bruce Smith (halfback) (1920–1967), American football player
- Bruce Smith (Australian footballer) (1944–2026), Australian rules footballer
- Bruce Smith (cricketer) (born 1946), New Zealand cricketer
- Bruce Smith (Canadian football) (1949–2013), Canadian football player
- Bruce Smith (luger) (born 1958), Canadian luger
- Bruce Smith (rugby union) (born 1959), New Zealand rugby union player

== Others ==
- Bruce D. Smith (born 1946), American archaeologist
