= Holly Smith =

Holly Smith may refer to:

== Sportswomen ==
- Holly Lincoln-Smith (born 1988), Australian water polo player
- Holly Smith (basketball), see Logan Thunder (WNBL)
- Holly Smith (badminton), see India at the 2011 Commonwealth Youth Games
- Holly Smith (equestrian) (born 1989), British show jumper

== Others ==
- Holly Martin Smith, professor
- Holly Smith, member of singing and dancing troupe The Golddiggers
- Holly Smith, fictional character in Across the Great Divide (film), played by Heather Rattray
- Holly Smith, beauty contestant (see Miss Colorado)
- B. Holly Smith, biological anthropologist

== See also ==
- Hollie Smith (born 1982), New Zealand musician
