= Aaron Smith =

Aaron Smith may refer to:

== Music ==
- Aaron Smith (born 1985), real name of American rapper Shwayze
- Aaron Smith (musician) (born 1950), American drummer and percussionist
- Aaron Smith (DJ), American music producer
- Aaron Smith, American guitarist for the band Brazil

== Sports ==
- Aaron Smith (linebacker) (1962–2008), American football player
- Aaron Smith (defensive end) (born 1976), American football player
- Aaron Smith (rugby league, born 1982), British rugby league footballer
- Aaron Smith (rugby league, born 1996), British rugby league footballer
- Aaron Smith (rugby union) (born 1988), New Zealand rugby union player

== Other ==
- Aaron Cody Smith, a white American policeman convicted for the 2016 Killing of Greg Gunn
- Aaron Smith (author), author and freelance journalist
- Aaron Smith (conspirator) (died 1701), English lawyer, involved in the Popish Plot and Rye House Plot
- Aaron Smith, co-creator of Australian TV series You Can't Ask That
- Aaron Smith (magician) (born 1976), American magician and writer
- Aaron Smith, president, International Neuropsychological Society
- Aaron Smith (poet), American poet
- Aaron Smith (mariner), alleged pirate
