= Karen Smith =

Karen Smith may refer to

== Sportspeople ==
- Karen Smith (Australian field hockey) (born 1979), Australian field hockey player
- Karen Smith (New Zealand field hockey) (born 1970), New Zealand field hockey player
- Karen Smith (diver) (born 1976), British Olympic diver
- Karen Smith (tennis) (born 1961), Australian tennis player

== Other people ==
- Karen Brucene Smith (born 1951), winner of the Miss International title in 1974
- Karen Rose Smith, American writer of over 55 romance novels
- Karen E. Smith (born 1965), American mathematician
- Karen A. Smith, New Zealand management academic
- Karen R. Smith, professor at Southwestern Law School
- Karen Elaine Smith, victim in the 2017 North Park Elementary School shooting

== Characters ==
- Karen Smith, a character from the 2004 movie Mean Girls
