= Elliott Smith (disambiguation) =

Elliott Smith (1969–2003) was an American singer-songwriter and musician.

Elliott Smith may also refer to:

- Elliott Smith (album), a 1995 album by Elliott Smith
- Elliott Smith (book), a 2007 biography about Elliott Smith
- Elliott F. Smith (1931–1987), American politician in the New Jersey General Assembly
- Bruce Elliott-Smith, British songwriter and producer
- Charles Henry Elliott-Smith (1889–1994), British air commodore

Elliot Smith may refer to:

- Elliot Smith (American football) (born 1967), defensive back
- Grafton Elliot Smith (1871–1937), Australian-British archaeologist and anatomist
- Elliot Smith House, a historic house in Worcester, Massachusetts
