= Emma Smith (disambiguation) =

Emma Smith (1804–1879) was the official wife of Joseph Smith and the first president of the Relief Society.

Emma Smith may also refer to:

- Emma Smith (artist) (1783–1853), English artist
- Emma Smith (author) (1923–2018), English novelist
- Emma Smith (gymnast) (born 1991), British trampoline gymnast
- Emma Elizabeth Smith (c. 1843–1888), prostitute and murder victim in London
- Emma Smith (scholar) (born 1970), lecturer in English at the University of Oxford
- Emma Waldo Smith Marshall (1879–1943), American baptist missionary
