= Trevor Smith =

Trevor Smith may refer to:

== Sport ==
- Trevor Smith (cricketer) (born 1977), English cricketer
- Trevor Smith (equestrian) (born 1959), Irish Olympic equestrian
- Trevor Smith (field hockey) (born 1949), Australian Olympic field hockey player
- Trevor Smith (fighter) (born 1981), American mixed martial artist
- Trevor Smith (footballer, born 1910) (1910–1997), Charlton Athletic, Fulham, Crystal Palace and Watford footballer
- Trevor Smith (footballer, born 1936) (1936–2003), Birmingham City and England footballer
- Trevor Smith (footballer, born 1965), Scottish footballer
- Trevor Smith (ice hockey) (born 1985), Canadian ice hockey player
- Trevor Smith (rugby union) (1920–2000), English rugby union player

== Other people ==
- Trevor Smith (actor) (born 1970), Canadian actor and media personality
- Trevor Smith (EastEnders), minor character in TV soap opera EastEnders
- Trevor Tahiem Smith, Jr. or Busta Rhymes (born 1972), American rapper
- Trevor Jude Smith, American ukulele player
- Trevor Smith, Baron Smith of Clifton (1937–2021), British Liberal Democrat politician
- Busta Rhymes (born 1972), American rapper, record producer and actor
