= Earl Smith =

Earl Smith may refer to:

== Sports ==
- Earl Smith (catcher) (1897–1963), MLB catcher, 1919–1930
- Earl Smith (1910s outfielder) (1891–1943), MLB outfielder, 1916–1922
- Earl Smith (1950s outfielder) (1928–2014), NL outfielder who played in the 1955 season
- J. R. Smith (Earl Smith III, born 1985), former NBA player
- Earl Smith (coach) (1917–2012), coach of many sports at Campbell University and East Carolina University, 1946–1953

== Others ==
- Earl H. Smith (1909–1987), Pennsylvania politician
- Earl "Chinna" Smith (born 1955), Jamaican guitarist
- Earl E. T. Smith (1903–1991), US ambassador to Cuba, 1958–1959
- Earl W. Smith, Republican candidate for mayor of Columbus, Ohio
- Earl Smith (sociologist) (born 1946), American sociologist
- Earl Leland Smith (1895–1973), American pilot, flight instructor, and mechanic
