= Calvin Smith (disambiguation) =

Calvin Smith may refer to:

- Cal Smith (1932–2013), American country singer
- Calvin Smith (born 1961), sprinter
- Calvin Smith Jr. (born 1987), sprinter
- Calvin Smith (Illinois politician) (1907–1968), pharmacist and Illinois state legislator
- Calvin Smith (Michigan politician) (died 1838), American politician and lawyer
- Calvin Smith (Mississippi) (1768–1840), settler and plantation owner
