= Sophia Smith =

Sophia or Sofia Smith may refer to:

- Sophia Smith (soccer, born 1978), American-Greek former soccer player
- Sophia Smith (college founder) (1796–1870), founder of Smith College
  - Sophia Smith Collection, repository of manuscripts, photographs, periodicals and other primary sources in women's history
- Fyang, also known as Sofia Smith (born 2006), social media personality
- Sophia Wilson (born 2000), American soccer player formerly known as Sophia Smith

== See also ==
- Sophia Smith Galer (born 1994), British journalist
- Sofia Tekela-Smith (born 1960), New Zealand artist
- Sophie Smith (born 1986), Australian water polo player
