= Oliver Smith =

Oliver Smith may refer to:

- Oliver Smith (actor) (born 1952), English actor, known for the Hellraiser film series
- Oliver Smith (designer) (1918–1994), American scenic designer, one of the founders of American Ballet Theatre
- Oliver Smith (politician) (born 1993), British Liberal Democrat politician
- Oliver Smith (cricketer) (born 1967), English cricketer
- Oliver H. Smith (1794–1859), American politician, U.S. Representative and Senator from Indiana
- Oliver P. Smith (1893–1977), American U.S. Marine Corps general
- Ollie Smith (rugby union, born 1982), English rugby player
- Ollie Smith (rugby union, born 2000), Scottish rugby union player
- Ollie Smith (American football) (1949–2021), American football player
- Ollie Smith (baseball) (1865–1954), American baseball player
- Olly Smith (born 1974), British TV presenter
- Olliver Smith (1898–1965), Norwegian modern pentathlete
- Oliver Smith (football coach) (born 1960), Turks and Caicos Islands football manager
- Oliver Smith, original developer of the Nura operating system

== See also ==
- Alva C. Smith (1871–1941), known as Ollie, American football player and coach
- Olive Smith (cricketer) (1923–2014), known as Ollie, Australian cricket player
