= Cary Smith =

Cary Smith may refer to:

- Cary Smith (ski mountaineer) (born 1968), American ski mountaineer
- Cary Smith (politician) (born 1950), Republican member of the Montana Legislature
