= Clive Smith =

Clive Smith may refer to:

- Clive Smith (footballer, born 1923) (1923–1999), Australian rules footballer
- Clive A. Smith (born 1944), British director and animator, co-founder of the Canadian animation studio Nelvana
- Clive Stafford Smith (born 1959), British attorney
- Clive Smith (footballer, born 1997), Welsh footballer
