= Cyril Smith (disambiguation) =

Sir Cyril Smith (1928–2010) was a British Liberal Democrat politician.

Cyril Smith may also refer to:

- Cyril Stanley Smith (1903–1992), British metallurgist and historian of science
- Cyril Smith (actor) (1892–1963), British actor
- Cyril Smith (cricketer) (1926–2009), Queensland opening bowler
- Cyril Smith (pianist) (1909–1974), English classical pianist
- Cyril Smith (Marxist) (1929–2008), British lecturer of statistics, socialist and revolutionary humanist
- Cyril Smith (footballer) (1893–?), Welsh footballer
