= Simon Smith =

Simon Smith may refer to:

- Simon Smith (cricketer) (born 1979), Scottish cricketer
- Simon Smith (diplomat) (born 1958), British Ambassador to South Korea and formerly Ukraine and Austria
- Simon Smith (drummer), drummer in several British indie rock bands
- Simon Smith (footballer), former footballer and now goalkeeping coach
- Simon Smith (rugby union) (born 1960), British rugby player
- Simon Smith (speaker), American politician; speaker of the Rhode Island House of Representatives 1709
- Simon Smith (politician), Wisconsin State Assemblyman
- "Simon Smith and the Amazing Dancing Bear", a 1967 song
- Simon J. Smith, British actor, animator and director
- Simon Kuznets (1901–1985), American economist
