= Hamilton Smith =

Hamilton Smith may refer to:

- Charles Hamilton Smith (1776–1859), English artist, naturalist, antiquary, illustrator, soldier, and spy
- Hamilton Lanphere Smith (1819–1903), American scientist, photographer, and astronomer
- Hamilton Smith (cricketer) (1884–1955), Hampshire cricketer
- Hamilton O. Smith (1931–2025), American microbiologist and Nobel laureate
