= Andrea Smith (diplomat) =

New Zealand public servant

Andrea Smith is a New Zealand public servant and current deputy secretary of the Ministry of Foreign Affairs.

== Life and career ==
Smith is currently deputy secretary of Asia-Pacific Economic Cooperation 2021 (APEC21) a role she took up in May 2017. Before this, she had been deputy secretary for the Americas and Asia Group for over five years. Smith has served overseas as New Zealand's ambassador to several countries in the Middle East including Turkey, Israel and Jordan.

On 16 November 2012, Smith delivered a key note address in front of several South Korean diplomats at the University of Auckland to mark the "Year of Friendship" between New Zealand and South Korea.

In March 2013, she received a good-will delegation representing the Chinese Communist Party to Victoria University of Wellington.
