= Abel Smith =

Abel Smith may refer to:

- Abel Smith (1717–1788), banker and MP for Aldborough, St Ives and St Germans (1774–1788)
- Abel Smith (1748–1779), MP for Nottingham (1778–1779)
- Abel Smith (1788–1859), MP for Malmesbury, Wendover, Midhurst and Hertfordshire (1810–1847)
- John Abel Smith (1802–1871), MP for Midhurst and Chichester (1830–1859 and 1863–1868)
- Abel Smith (1829–1898), MP for Hertfordshire and Hertford (intermittently 1854–1898)
- Abel Henry Smith (1862–1930), MP for Christchurch (1892–1900) and Hertford (1900-1910)

== People with the surname ==
- Sir Alexander Abel Smith (1904–1980), British Army officer and merchant banker
- Brian Abel-Smith (1926–1996) British economist and welfare reformer
- Henriette, Lady Abel Smith (1914–2005), lady-in-waiting to Queen Elizabeth II, wife of Sir Alexander Abel Smith
- Sir Henry Abel Smith (1900–1993), Governor of Queensland
- Lady May Abel Smith, (1906–1994), born Princess May of Teck, wife of Sir Henry Abel Smith

== See also ==
- Smith family (bankers); shows the family relationships between most of the people listed above
