= Vernon B. Smith =

American regional artist (1894–1969)

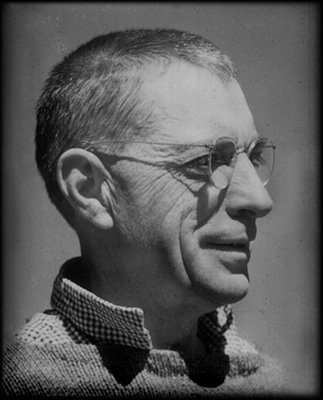
- Smith in 1958
- Born: Vernon Bennett Smith; August 8, 1894; Cortland, New York, U.S.
- Died: September 1, 1969 (aged 75); Orleans, Massachusetts, U.S.
- Known for: painting, woodcarving
- Notable work: VJ Day Orleans (1946), "The Sea" (1950)
- Movement: Social Realism, Abstract Art

Vernon B. Smith (1894-1969), was an American regional artist, often associated with Cape Cod. He was a Federal Art Project regional administrator and as an artist he was best known for his bas-relief woodcarvings. His works also include oil paintings, watercolors, batik designs, and constructions in aluminum.

== Biography ==
=== Early years ===
Born August 8, 1894 in Cortland, New York, Vernon Smith spent his early years in and around the Finger Lakes region. In 1913, Smith began attending the School of Fine and Applied Arts in New York City. His painting instructors included Jonas Lie, Howard Giles and Sloan Bredin. He learned metalwork, textile design, and interior decoration under the school's founder Frank Parsons. Smith taught for a year at the Manhattan School of Art.

=== World War I ===
In April, 1918, Vernon Smith was conscripted into the Army and arrived at the front in July, As a private, Smith's duties included camouflaging artillery and attending to mules. He often accompanied Sgt. Harry K. Fisk, a New York illustrator, to sketch advanced locations.

After the war, Smith elected to stay in France where he spent time in Paris and then Poitiers, where he enrolled at the Sorbonne Institute of Art.

In January 1920, Smith returned to New York City, where he met Doris Withycomb, who he later married. After spending the summer running a tea shop in Provincetown, Massachusetts, Smith moved to Beacon Street in Boston, where he designed stage sets for the Peabody Playhouse.

=== Cape Cod ===
In January 1922, at the invitation of Sally White Johnstone and Prescott Townsend, Smith and Withycomb moved to Orleans on Cape Cod where they married and purchased a home.

During his first decade on Cape Cod, Smith made his living designing batik fabrics and a product line of aluminum buckles and buttons. He also opened a small antiques shop. By 1927, the Smiths had three children: Joy, Sara, and Peter.

In 1933, a group of Smith's neighbors on Monument Road organized an Episcopal congregation: The Church of the Holy Spirit. Smith designed the small church and outfitted it with engraved sconces, carved pews, and a crucifix. A small cultural movement formed on Monument Road which in addition to the church, included summer camps, an outdoor theater, and "The Galley West," which sold local crafts including Smith's metal work.

=== Federal Art Project ===
In 1936, Smith was appointed supervisor of the Cape Cod artists on relief under the Federal Art Project. His charges ranged from Modernists to Regionalists, including Karl Knaths, Blanche Lazzell, Phillip Malicoat, Vernon Herbert Coleman, George David Yater, Eliot Orr, and Howard Gibbs. He also associated with Ross Moffett, Edwin Dickinson, and Edward Hopper, whom he joined in group exhibitions and social activities. Whitney E. Smith noted in his doctoral dissertation that "The most important man for the Provincetown artists in [the FAP bureaucracy] was fellow-artist Vernon Smith."

In the summer of 1937, Smith was one of 12 Federal Art Project artists selected to tour the territory of Alaska and record their impressions. With fellow artists Prescott Jones and Edwin Boyd Johnson, Smith traveled to Valdez, Fairbanks, and McKinley Park. Artwork from the tour was distributed to federal facilities, with much of it remaining in Alaska.

=== World War II ===
During the early years of World War II, Smith worked in a ball bearing factory in Connecticut. While in Orleans, he volunteered for shore patrol. Later, Smith performed civilian service at Woods Hole Oceanographic Institute, charting ocean currents and lettering maps.

=== Postwar ===
After the war, Smith was represented by the Kraushaar Galleries in New York City. He had a one-man show there in 1946 and participated in other gallery shows throughout the 1950s.

In 1948, Smith's wife became debilitated with multiple sclerosis and died. That same year, Smith helped found the Cape Cod Art Association in Barnstable, Massachusetts and served as its president in 1951.

Smith continued throughout the 1950s to teach art classes at his private studio and in public schools. He continued his artwork and exhibited widely.

In 1949 he married for a second time to Gwen Barry from New York. This second marriage ended in 1961, after which Smith began to divide his time between summers on Cape Cod and travels around the country the rest of the year. He set up a studio in Corrales, New Mexico where his son Peter Smith lived.

In 1963, Smith acquired a new dealer for his art in Lester K. Henderson from Carmel, California. Several times Smith stayed in Carmel where he showed his work and took on commissions.

In 1965, Smith suffered a stroke while in New Mexico. Partially paralyzed as a result, this ended his artistic output. He returned to Cape Cod and lived under the care of his daughter, Sara Smith Joy. He died in September 1969. His ashes were interred under one of his soapstone carvings at the Church of the Holy Spirit, Orleans, Massachusetts.

== Art work ==
=== Early works ===
From Smith's time in France, the few surviving canvases display influence of the Barbizon school of landscape. Other canvases, from his time at the Sorbonne Institute of Art, show the colorful, confident brushwork of a post-impressionist. His subjects were farms, peasants and flowering trees.

From the 1920s, Smith's Batiks displayed themes from the ages of sailing ships and medieval fairy tale towns. Crafts from this time consisted of hammered aluminum items such as buttons, buckles, serving trays, candle sconces, while from wood, Smith carved detailed display samples of classic cottage antiques.

=== 1930s ===
In the early 1930s, Smith developed an “antique" style of painting. Utilizing oil glaze over gessoed hard board, he scratched and scraped the surface of wet paint to create highlights. Still lifes featured antique props set up in his studio. Landscapes depicted simple farmhouses and cottages in rural Cape Cod. Smith limited his palette to basic earth tones, avoiding overuse of white, with dashes of red or viridian applied sparingly. Smith completed the antique feel of his paintings by setting them in distressed frames.

Smith continued to refine his "antique" style and apply it to the Social Realism movement in the later 1930s. Cultural artifacts of the era populate his paintings: telephone poles, storefronts, jalopies, fishing draggers, and catboats describe scores of paintings that he produced while employed by the FAP.

From his FAP tour of Alaska, Smith's work features the re-occurring motif of modern man's herculean, but puny efforts to tame the vast Alaskan wilderness. His paintings and drawings are replete with boats, wharfs, automobiles, seaplanes, and dredges placed against backgrounds of towering mountains and wild rivers.

=== Postwar ===
Released from the troubles of the war, Smith was reinvigorated with artistic activity. Beginning with “V-J Day” and through a succession of oil paintings, Smith's works became populated with the citizenry of Orleans. Scenes of square dancing, mending nets, trick-or-treating, raising roof-beams, deer hunting, sunbathing, and picnics celebrated the vibrant character of small town America. His palette broadened, while his compositions became more playful with ever-increasing abstraction and differing perspectives. Boats, fish nets, beach umbrellas, and musical instruments took on cubist arrangements. As noted by artist and Professor of Art History Tony Ververs, "Smith used a personal adaption of a cubist idiom, much as did Lassell or Knaths... a common practice among early abstractionists."

By the early 1950s, Smith began to carve stylized birds and whales. This led to a major new direction for Smith. Abstract motifs from his paintings appeared on flat wood panels, carved in bas-relief. "The Sea,” a depiction of a half-veiled female figure floating in a liquid cosmos, is an early example of his new technique. Other panels combine ubiquitous spirals with clusters of shorebirds, or diving whales. Smith carved in deep-silhouette and accented the depth with a tight color palette. Human mythologies appeared as well; as in “Leda,” where the graceful arc of a swan's neck arrives at a woman's nipple. Again, Tony Vevers: "the adoption of a new technique and medium gave Smith a sense of freedom; the rather hesitant abstraction of his earlier paintings become a major theme in his new work." Wood carved panels became Smith's principal form of expression until the end of his career.

Smith executed a number of church commissions. He carved crucifixes of simple piety, and created panels based on the meditations of St. Augustine. He interpreted the Stations of the Cross for a Jesuit College and revisited the Church of the Holy Spirit, carving a set of doors depicting the Holy Spirit as a dove. In the late 1950s, Smith produced a series of carvings of ancient alphabets and alchemy symbols.

Influenced by his friendships with John Hay, Clare Leighton, Harry Holl, and Betty Lane, Smith's work shifted toward conservation and naturalist education in the early 1960s. Cell forms, starbursts, and extraterrestrial craters appeared in his carvings. “Grasshopper,” with a micro view from the grasses, was created the same year as “Cosmos,” a macro view through a telescope.

=== New Mexico and Carmel ===
From his travels in the 1960s, Smith expanded on his motifs. From the American Southwest, the confluence of geology, history, and the Native American community led to panels populated with cactus and yucca plants, canyons, and Pueblos. “Pueblo Village” and “Mesa Verde” exemplify the carvings from his expeditions to the southwest.

The time spent on the west coast, mostly in Carmel, California, resulted in additional motifs – seals, surf, redwood forests, waterfalls, and rolling hills.

Smith's artistic work ended in 1965.

== Quotes by others on Vernon Smith ==
“Smith is one of the few artists today whose work has an enduring quality which lifts it above the passing fashions of various ‘isms.’ His sense of design and subtle use of color is so beautiful that he has no need of momentary tricks to draw attention to his work.” – Clare Leighton, noted wood-engraver

“The paintings… provide a biography of Cape Cod in which villages, beaches, harbors, sailboats, schools of fish, the frenzy of a square dance, the solitude of the surf fisherman are rendered in swirling line and broken plane, and arranged symbolically to convey not just a sense of the past, but of the future as well.” – Paul Brodeur, writer

“Try to name the ‘famous’ woodcarvers of the world and you probably will not use all the fingers on one hand….take the opportunity to see the accomplishments of Vernon Smith, who pushed the bounds of relief carving probably farther than any 20th century artist.” – Joyce Johnson, sculptor and historian

== Gallery ==
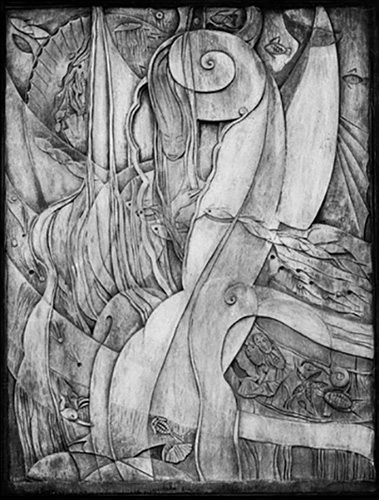
The Sea, wood panel, 1950

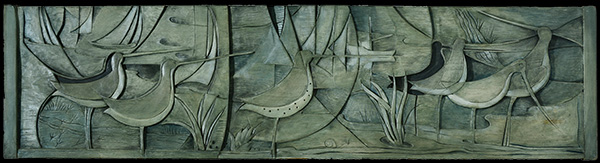
Shore Birds, wood panel, 1960

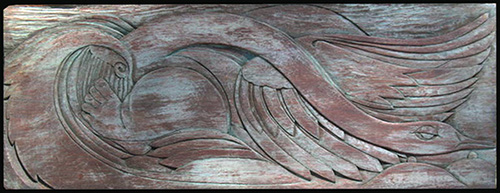
Leda, wood panel, 1959

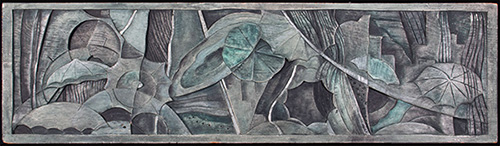
Beach Umbrellas, wood panel, c.1962

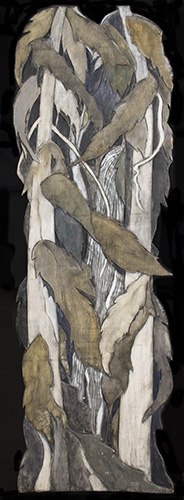
Tall Timber, wood carving, 1962

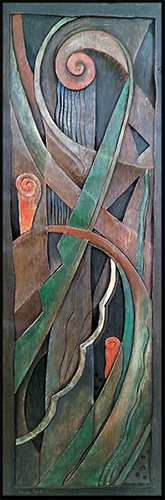
Heavens, wood carving, 1956

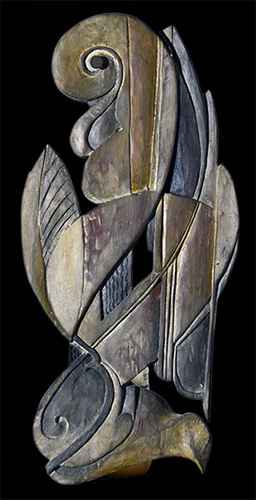
Untitled Abstract, wood carving, c.1958

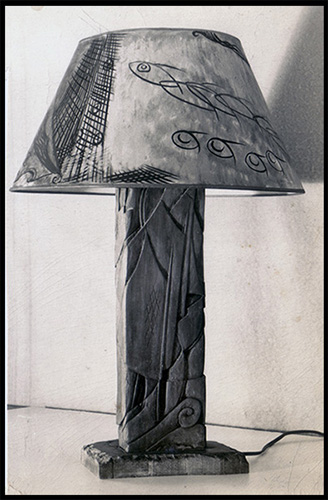
Lamp, carved wood, painted shade, c.1960

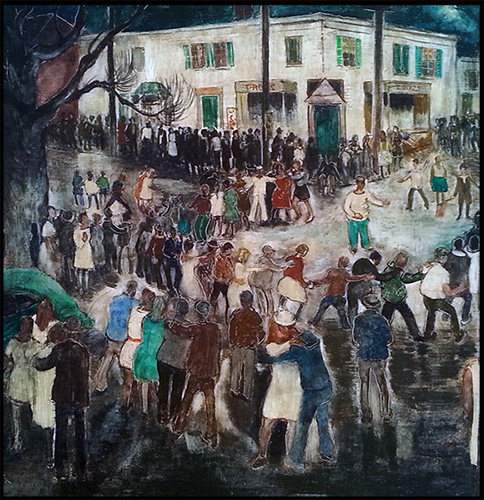
VJ Day (detail), oil painting, 1946

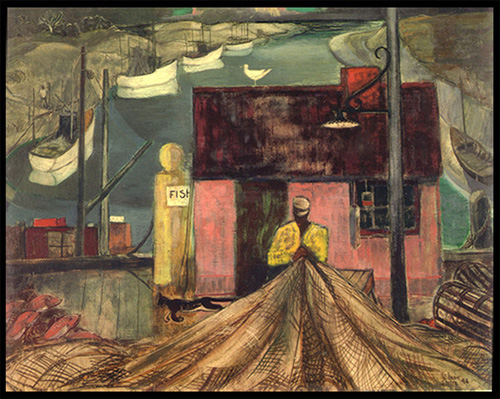
Pink Fish House, oil painting, 1946

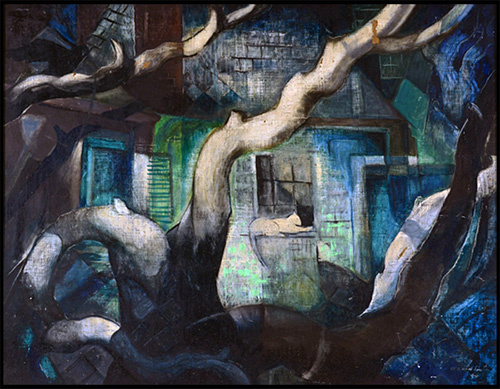
Spectral Chessboard, oil painting, 1948

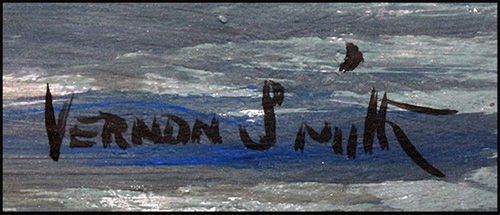
V.B.Smith signature

== Exhibits and representation ==
=== Solo exhibitions ===
- 1997 – Provincetown Art Association and Museum, Provincetown, Massachusetts
- 1978 – Orleans Art Gallery, Orleans, Massachusetts
- 1961 – Symphony Hall, Boston, Massachusetts
- 1960 – Lester Henderson Gallery, Carmel, California
- 1959 – Cape Cod Art Association, Barnstable, Massachusetts
- 1952 – Nieta Cole's Art Center, Orleans, Massachusetts
- 1946 – Kraushaar Galleries, New York, New York
- 1934 – Walker-Goodman Art Gallery, Boston, Massachusetts

=== Group exhibitions ===
- 1987 – Anchorage Museum of History and Art, Anchorage, Alaska
- 1977 – DeCordova Museum, Lincoln, Massachusetts
- 1959 – Addison Gallery of American Art, Andover, Massachusetts
- 1958 – Cape Cod Art Association, Barnstable, Massachusetts
- 1952 – Montclair Art Museum, Montclair, New Jersey
- 1946 – Virginia Museum of Fine Arts, Richmond, Virginia
- 1946 – Pennsylvania Academy of the Fine Arts, Philadelphia, Pennsylvania
- 1938–present: Provincetown Art Association, Provincetown, Massachusetts

=== Collections ===
- Anchorage Museum of History and Art, Anchorage, Alaska
- New Britain Museum of American Art, New Britain, Connecticut
- Cape Cod Museum of Art, Dennis, Massachusetts
- Dartmouth College, Hanover, New Hampshire
- Museum of Fine Arts, Boston, Massachusetts
- Museum of Modern Art, New York, New York
- Phillips Academy, Andover, Massachusetts
- Provincetown Art Association and Museum, Provincetown, Massachusetts
- Springfield Museum of Art, Springfield, Massachusetts
- Toledo Museum of Art, Toledo, Ohio

==== Selected liturgical works ====
- Holy Cross Seminary, North Easton, Massachusetts
- Memorial Chapel, Brewster, Massachusetts
- Church of the Holy Spirit, Orleans, Massachusetts

==== Representation ====
- 1944–1965 – Kraushaar Galleries, New York, New York
- 1960–1966 – Lester Henderson Gallery, Carmel, California
- 1966–1969 – Vernon Smith Gallery, Orleans, Massachusetts

==== Appointments ====
- 1951 – President, Cape Cod Art Association
- 1937 – Tour of Alaska, U.S. Department of the Interior
- 1934–1937 – Supervisor for Southeastern Massachusetts, Federal Arts Project (WPA)
