= Floyd Smith =

Floyd Smith may refer to:

- Floyd Smith (ice hockey) (born 1935), Canadian ice hockey centre and coach
- Floyd E. Smith (1912–1989), American labor union leader
- Floyd Smith (musician) (1917–1982), American jazz guitarist and record producer
- Floyd Smith (physician) (1885–1961), medical doctor, Christian missionary and witness to the Armenian Genocide

== See also ==
- James Floyd Smith (1884–1956), American test pilot and parachute expert
