= June Smith =

June Smith may refer to:

- June C. Smith (1876–1947), Chief Justice of the Illinois Supreme Court
- June Smith (jazz singer) (1930–2016), British-born Australian jazz singer, trumpeter and music teacher
