= Lemuel Smith (disambiguation) =

Lemuel Smith may refer to:

- Lemuel Smith (born 1941), serial killer
- Lemuel F. Smith (1890–1956), Virginia lawyer and judge
- Lemuel Smith (cricketer) (1880–1927), English cricketer
