= Lucy Smith =

Lucy Smith may refer to:

- Elder Lucy Smith, also known as Lucy Turner Smith (1874–1952), African-American Pentecostal pastor and healer
- Lucie Smith, birth name of Lucie Lagerbielke (1865–1931), Swedish writer and painter
- Lucy Abel Smith, British author, historian, arts administrator, and tourism businesswoman
- Lucy Eaton Smith (1845–1894), American Roman Catholic nun
- Lucy Harth Smith (1888–1955), American educator, writer, and activist
- Lucy Mack Smith (1775–1856), American mother of Joseph Smith, Jr., founder of the Latter Day Saint movement
- Lucy Masey Smith (1861–1936), New Zealand editor, feminist, and temperance- and welfare worker
- Lucy Smith (legal scholar) (1934–2013), Norwegian legal scholar and professor of law
- Lucy Smith (radio presenter) (born 1994), Australian radio presenter on Triple J
- Lucy Toulmin Smith (1838–1911), Anglo-American antiquarian and librarian
- Lucy Wilmot Smith (1861–1889), American teacher, journalist, suffragist, and historian
