= Noel Smith =

Noel Smith may refer to:

- Noel M. Smith (1895–1955), American film director and writer
- Noel Smith (footballer) (1918–2008), Australian rules footballer
- Noel "Razor" Smith, British writer and former criminal
