= Emily Smith =

Emily Smith may refer to:

- Emily Smith (author), English children's author
- Emily Smith (singer) (born 1981), Scottish folk singer
- Emily Smith (field hockey) (born 1992), Australian field hockey player
- Emily Smith (cricketer) (born 1995), Australian cricketer
- Emily Smith, 1st Viscountess Hambleden (died 1913), wife of William Henry Smith
- Emily Smith (mayor), mayor of Coventry, England
- Emily Mae Smith, American artist
- Emilie Flygare-Carlén (1807–1892), née Smith
