= Dominic Smith =

Dominic Smith may refer to:

- Dominic Smith (author) (born 1971), Australian-American novelist
- Dominic Smith (baseball) (born 1995), American baseball player
- Dominic Smith (gymnast) (born 1993), British acrobatic gymnast
- Dominic Smith (footballer, born 1995), English footballer (forward)
- Dominic Smith (footballer, born 1996), English footballer (defender)
- Dominic Smith (politician), Trinidad and Tobago member of parliament
- Dominic Smith, (born 1973), birth name of Dynamite MC, English rapper and emcee

== See also ==
- Smith (surname)
