= Oscar Smith =

Oscar Smith may refer to:

- Oscar J. Smith (1859–1937), American lawyer and politician
- Oscar Smith (actor) (1885–1956), African American actor
- Oscar Franklin Smith (1950–2025), American executed murderer
- Oscar Smith (American football) (born 1963), American football running back for NFL's Detroit Lions
- Oscar Smith (gymnast) (born 1991), Swedish trampolinist

== See also ==
- Oscar F. Smith High School, American public school in Chesapeake, Virginia, named for local civic leader Oscar Frommel Smith
- Johan Oscar Smith (1871–1943), Norwegian Christian leader
- William Oscar Smith (1917–1991), American jazz double bassist and music educator
