= Darren Smith =

Darren Smith may refer to:

== Sports ==
- Darren Smith (Australian rules footballer) (born 1965), Port Adelaide premiership player
- Darren Smith (rugby league) (born 1968), Australian rugby league footballer
- Darren Smith (cyclist) (1972–1992), killed in a road accident after competing at the Barcelona Olympics
- Darren Smith (field hockey) (born 1973), New Zealand field hockey player
- Darren Smith (footballer, born 1980), Scottish footballer for Arbroath FC
- Darren Smith (footballer, born 1986), Scottish footballer for Ballingry Rovers FC
- Darren Smith (footballer, born 1988), Scottish footballer for Stenhousemuir FC
- Darren Smith (footballer, born 1996), South African footballer for Detroit City FC

== Other ==
- Darren Smith (actor) (born 1962), producer and star of Repo! The Genetic Opera
- Darren Smith, drummer and singer with Canadian band Harem Scarem

== See also ==
- Darrin Smith (born 1970), American football linebacker
