= Philip Smith =

Philip or Phil Smith may refer to:

== Sports ==
- Phil Smith (Australian footballer) (1946–2010), Australian rules player
- Phil Smith (basketball) (1952–2002), American basketball player
- Philip Smith (footballer, born 1885) (1885–1918), English football player for Chelsea and Burnley
- Phil Smith (footballer, born 1979), English football goalkeeper for Swindon, Portsmouth and Aldershot
- Phil Smith (rugby) (1946–2000), Australian rugby union and rugby league player
- Phil Smith (American football) (born 1960), American football player

== Entertainment ==
- Phil Smith, guitarist for The Lovin' Spoonful
- Philip Smith (musician) (born 1952), American trumpeter
- Philip Smith (producer), New Zealand film and television producer and writer

== Politics ==
- Phil Smith (Alabama politician) (1931-2020), American businessman, lawyer, and politician
- Phil Smith (Australian politician) (born 1938), Australian politician and teacher
- Phil Smith (Missouri politician), American politician; member of the Missouri House of Representatives
- Philip Smith, Baron Smith of Hindhead (born 1966), Conservative member of the British House of Lords
- Philip Smith (Northern Ireland politician) (born 1967), member of the Northern Ireland Assembly

== In the military ==
- Philip Smith (British Army officer) (died 1894)
- Philip Smith (VC) (1829–1906), Irish recipient of the Victoria Cross
- Philip E. Smith (born 1934), U.S. Air Force fighter pilot
- Philip F. Smith (1932–2017), Master Chief Petty Officer of the U.S. Coast Guard

== In science ==
- Philip Edward Smith (1884–1970), American endocrinologist
- Phillip Hagar Smith (1905–1987), American electrical engineer
- Philip Hubert Smith (1906–1969), British automotive engineer and technical author
- Philip Sidney Smith (1877-1949), American geologist

== Other ==
- Philip Smith (criminal) (born 1965), British spree killer
- Philip Smith (theater owner) (1899-1961), American theater owner
- Philip Smith (born 1988), founder of the Friends of the British Overseas Territories
- Philip A. Smith (1933–2007), president of Providence College 1994–2005
- Philip Alan Smith (1920–2010), bishop of New Hampshire in the Episcopal Church
- Phillip K. Smith III, American artist
- Philip S. Smith, American entrepreneur
- Philip Smith Mountains, Alaskan mountain range
