= Wilbur Smith (disambiguation) =

Wilbur Smith (1933–2021) was a South African novelist.

Wilbur Smith may also refer to:

- Wilbur C. Smith (1884–1952), American football coach and university administrator
- Wilbur M. Smith (1894–1976), American theologian
- Wib Smith (born Wilbur Floyd Smith; 1886–1959), Major League Baseball catcher

== See also ==
- Wilbur Smith Associates, a transportation engineering firm acquired by Camp Dresser & McKee in 2011 to form CDM Smith
- Will Smith (disambiguation)
