= Humphrey Smith =

Humphrey Smith may refer to

== Politicians ==
- Humphrey "Yankee" Smith (1774–1857), unofficial founder of the city of Smithville, Missouri and abolitionist
- Humphrey Smith (MP) (1542–1589), MP for Bodmin

== Others ==
- Humphrey Smith (Quaker) (died 1663), religious writer
- Humphrey Smith Racing, NASCAR racing team
- Humphrey Smith (businessman) (1944–2026), owner of Samuel Smith Old Brewery
- Humphrey Smith, fictional character in The Sins of St. Anthony
