= Donna Smith =

Donna Smith may refer to:

- Donna Smith (athlete) (1965–1999), Australian Paralympian
- Donna Smith (footballer) (born 1967), English former international women's football defender
- Donna Smith (model) (born 1960), American model and Playboy Playmate
- Donna Smith, Miss South Dakota USA
