= Travis Smith =

Travis Smith is the name of:

- Travis Smith (Oz), fictional character in the TV series Oz
- Travis Smith (musician) (born 1982), American musician, former drummer for Trivium
- Travis Smith (baseball) (born 1972), American baseball player
- Travis Smith (artist) (born 1970), American graphic artist
- Travis Smith (cyclist) (born 1980), Canadian cyclist at the 2006 Commonwealth Games
- Travis Smith (politician)
