= Angela Smith =

Angela Smith may refer to:

== People ==
- Angela Smith (squash player) (born 1953), English professional player and coach
- Angela Smith, Baroness Smith of Basildon (born 1959), English peer; MP from 1997 to 2010
- Angela Smith (athlete) (born 1960), English long-distance runner; married name Angela Tooby
- Angela Smith (South Yorkshire politician) (born 1961), English MP from 2010 to 2019
- Angela Roberts (married name Smith) (1968–2024), Canadian curler
- Angela Yuriko Smith, Ryukyuan-American writer and publisher

== Fictional characters ==
- Angela Smith, Mona's rival on the 1999 Canadian children's animated TV series Mona the Vampire

== See also ==
- Angie Smit (born 1991), New Zealand middle-distance runner; married name Angie Petty
