= Elbert Smith =

Elbert Smith may refer to:

- Elbert A. Smith (1871–1959), American leader in the Reorganized Church of Jesus Christ of Latter Day Saints
- Elbert B. Smith (1920–2013), American historian and author
- Elbert H. Smith, 19th-century American poet
- Elbert S. Smith (1911–1983), American politician
- Elbert Smith, an actor in the horror movie, The Blob or 4D Man
