= Clay Smith =

Clay Smith may refer to:

- Clay Smith (cricketer) (born 1971), Bermudian cricketer
- Clay Smith (baseball) (1914–2002), Major League Baseball pitcher
- Clay Smith (footballer) (born 1993), Australian rules footballer
- Clay King Smith (1970–2001), American murderer
- Green Clay Smith (1826–1895), major general during the Civil War
- Clay Smith (trombonist) (1878–1930), American instrumentalist (chiefly trombonist) and composer
- Clay Smith Cams, an auto shop founded in 1947 by hot rod enthusiast Clay Smith (1921–1954)
- Clay Smith (music composer) (born 1953), American music composer, network television writer and producer, son of Arthur Smith (composer of "Guitar Boogie" and "Dueling Banjos")
