= Virgil Smith =

Virgil Smith may refer to:

- Virgil C. Smith (1947–2025), American judge and former member of the Michigan House of Representatives and Michigan Senate
- Virgil Smith, Jr. (born 1979), American politician and member of the Michigan Senate, son of Virgil C.
