= Neil Smith =

Neil or Neal Smith may refer to:

== Sports ==
- Neil Smith (American football) (born 1966), in the NFL
- Neil Smith (cricketer, born 1967), English cricketer
- Neil Smith (cricketer, born 1949) (1949–2003), English cricketer for Yorkshire and Essex
- Neil Smith (footballer) (born 1971), English
- Neil Smith (ice hockey) (born 1954), Canadian executive and broadcaster

== Music ==
- Neal Smith (drummer) (born 1947), founding member of Alice Cooper
- Neil Smith (musician), former bassist in AC/DC and Rose Tattoo

== Other ==
- Neil Smith (linguist) (1939–2023), British linguist
- Neil Smith (geographer) (1954–2012), Scottish-born American professor
- Neal Smith (politician) (1920–2021), U.S. representative from Iowa
- Neil Smith (writer), Canadian fiction writer
- L. Neil Smith (1946–2021), American science fiction author and political activist
- Neil Smith (politician), member of the Missouri House of Representatives

== See also ==
- Neil Smyth (1928–2017), Australian cricketer
