= Devin Smith =

Devin Smith may refer to:

- Devin Smith (basketball) (born 1983), American basketball player
- Devin Smith (American football) (born 1992), American football wide receiver

== See also ==
- De'Veon Smith (born 1994), American football player
- Devon Smith (born 1981), Grenadian cricketer
- Devon Smith (footballer) (born 1993), Australian rules footballer
