= Tyrone Smith =

Tyrone Smith may refer to:

- Tyrone Smith (athlete) (born 1984), Bermudian born long jumper
- Tyrone Smith (journalist) (born 1975), Scottish television journalist/presenter
- Tyrone Smith (rugby) (born 1983), Professional rugby league and rugby union footballer

== See also ==
- Ty Smith (born 1977), drummer
- Tyron Smith (born 1990), American football player
