= Toby Smith (disambiguation) =

Toby Smith was a keyboardist with the band Jamiroquai.

Toby Smith may also refer to:

- Toby Smith (rugby union)

== See also ==
- Tobie Smith, swimmer
- Thomas Henry Smith (American politician), known as Tobe Smith
- Tobias Smith, known as Tubbo or Toby Smith, English Twitch streamer and YouTuber
