= Sharon Smith =

Sharon Smith may refer to:

- Sharon Smith (writer), American socialist writer and activist
- Sharon Smith Bush, former wife of Neil Bush
- Sharon Smyth, child actress on TV's Dark Shadows (Sarah Collins)
- Sharon “Shari” Smith, American murder victim
- Sharon L. Smith, marine ecologist
