= Amy Smith =

Amy Smith may refer to:

== People ==
- Amy Smith (cricketer) (born 2004), Australian cricketer
- Amy Smith (swimmer) (born 1987), British swimmer
- Amy Smith (footballer) (born 1998), Australian rules footballer
- Amy B. Smith (born 1962), lecturer and inventor
- Amy C. Smith (born 1966), American archaeologist
- Amy Erica Smith (born 1976), American political scientist
- Aimee Smith, candidate in the 2010 United States House of Representatives elections in Michigan

== Fictional ==
- Amy Greenwood, married name Smith, on the Australian soap opera Neighbours
