= Justin Smith =

Justin Smith may refer to:

== Entertainment ==
- Justin Smith (actor), Australian television and stage actor
- Justin Smith (poker player) (born 1988), American poker player
- Justin Smith (presenter) (born 1968), Australian journalist, radio presenter, producer and writer
- Justin Smith (born 1978), American hip hop music producer known as Just Blaze
- Justin Smith, member of the singing group Jericho Road

== Sports ==
- Justin Smith (basketball) (born 1999), American basketball player
- Justin Smith (defensive end) (born 1979), former American football defensive end
- Justin Smith (linebacker) (born 1979), American football player
- Justin Smith (rugby league) (born 1977), Australian rugby league player
- Justin Smith (soccer) (born 2003), Canadian soccer player

== Other ==
- Justin Smith (milliner) (born 1978), British hat maker
- Justin A. Smith (1818–1879), New York politician
- Justin B. Smith (born 1969), American businessman at Bloomberg
- Justin D. Smith (born 1985), American lawyer and judge on the United States Court of Appeals for the Eighth Circuit
- Justin E. H. Smith (born 1972), Canadian-American philosopher and author
- Justin Harvey Smith (1857–1930), American historian
- Justin Smith, one of the prison officers killed in the 2017 Pasquotank County prison murders
