= Vivian Smith =

Vivian Smith may refer to:

- Vivian Smith (chess player) (born 1951), New Zealand chess player
- Ian Smith (South African cricketer) (Vivian Ian Smith, 1925–2015), South African test cricketer
- Vivian Smith (poet) (born 1933), Australian poet
- Vivian Smith, 1st Baron Bicester (1867–1956), British merchant banker
- Vivian L. Smith Elementary
- Viv Smith, character in Specials
- Vivienne Smith (swimmer) (born 1952), Irish Olympic swimmer
- Vivian Smith (suffragist) (1891–1961), American civil rights activist and women's suffragist
- Vivian B. Smith (1886–1952), American architect
