= Lamar Smith (disambiguation) =

Lamar Smith (born 1947) is an American politician.

Lamar Smith may also refer to:

- Lamar Smith (activist) (1892–1955), American civil rights activist
- Lamar Smith (American football) (born 1970), American former football running back
- Anthony Lamar Smith, American man who was killed by a police officer in 2011
