= Luke Smith =

Luke Smith may refer to:

- Luke Smith (The Sarah Jane Adventures)
- Luke Smith (writer), American writer of Bungie
- Luke Smith (record producer) (born 1978), English record producer of the UK band Clor
- Luke Smith (session musician), British keyboardist
- Luke Smith (tennis) (born 1976), former Australian professional tour tennis player
- Luke Smith (volleyball) (born 1990), Australian volleyball player
- Luke Smith (rugby union) (born 1971), rugby union player
- Luke Smith (rugby league), Australian rugby league footballer
- Luke Smith (politician), mayor of Logan City, Queensland, Australia (2016–2020)
