= Kirsten Smith =

Kirsten Smith may refer to:

- Kirsten Smith (writer) (born 1970), American screenwriter
- Kirsten Smith (athlete), New Zealand track and field athlete
