= Arnold Smith (disambiguation) =

Arnold Smith (1915–1994) was a Canadian diplomat.

Arnold Smith may also refer to:

- Arnold Kirke Smith (1850–1927), English footballer
- Arnold Spencer-Smith (1883–1916), British clergyman and amateur photographer
- Arnold Neilson Smith (1889–1957), Liberal party member of the Canadian House of Commons
- Arnold Dunbar Smith (1866–1933), English architect
