= Kelly Smith (disambiguation) =

Kelly Smith is an English football forward.

Kelly Smith may also refer to:

- Kelly Smith (wheelchair racer), Canadian paralympic athlete
- Kelly Smith (rugby union) (born 1995), English rugby union player
- Kelley Smith (born 1946), American politician
- Kelly Miller Smith (1920–1984), Baptist preacher, author, and prominent activist in the American Civil Rights Movement
- Kelly Preston (1962-2020), née Kelly Smith, actress
- Marc Smith (poet) (born 1949), often referred to as Kelly Smith
