= Wilma Smith =

Wilma Smith may refer to:

- Wilma Smith (violinist) (born 1956), Fijian-born violinist
- Wilma Smith (newscaster) (born 1946), American television news anchor
