= Johnson Smith =

Johnson Smith may refer to:

== People ==
- Geoffrey Johnson Smith (1924–2010), British politician
- Johnson C. Smith (1844–1919), namesake of Johnson C. Smith University
- Alfred Johnson Smith, founder of the Johnson Smith Company
- Lisa Johnson Smith, a host of the BET talk show Teen Summit

== Places ==
- Johnson C. Smith University, Charlotte, North Carolina
- Linda Johnson Smith Soccer Stadium, Worcester, Massachusetts

== Other ==
- Johnson Smith Company, an American mail-order company
- Johnson Smith Company, an album by the Boston Chinks on Goner Records

== See also ==
- Johnson (disambiguation)
- Smith (disambiguation)
- John Smith (disambiguation)
