= Percy Smith =

Percy Smith is the name of:

== Politics ==
- Percy Smith (Australian politician) (1920–2002), known as Ray, member of the Queensland Legislative Assembly
- Percy Smith (Canadian politician) (1922–2009), member of the House of Commons

== Science ==
- F. Percy Smith (1880–1945), English naturalist and pioneer photographer
- Percy Smith (ethnologist) (1840–1922), New Zealand ethnologist and surveyor

== Sport ==
- Percy Smith (Australian footballer) (1887–1974), Australian rules footballer
- Percy Smith (English cricketer) (1804–1876), English clergyman and cricketer
- Percy Smith (English footballer) (1880–1959), English football player and manager
- Percy Smith (New Zealand cricketer) (1883-1932), New Zealand cricketer

== Other occupations ==
- Percy John Delf Smith, (1882-1948), British artist (né Percy John Smith before marrying)
- Percy Smith (Australian priest), (1903–1982), Australian priest

== See also ==
- Percy Smith Medal, a New Zealand award for anthropologists
