= Elmer Smith =

Elmer Smith may refer to:

- Elmer Smith (activist) (1888–1932), American lawyer and union defender
- Elmer Smith (baseball) (1892–1984), baseball outfielder who played from 1914 through 1925
- Mike Smith (1890s outfielder) (1868–1945), real name Elmer Ellsworth Smith, baseball outfielder who played from 1886 through 1901
- Elmer Roy Smith (1913–1989), politician in Ontario, Canada
- Elmer Boyd Smith (1860–1943), American writer and illustrator
- Elmer Smith (American football) (died 1987), American football and basketball player and coach
- Elmer Smith Power Plant, a power plant in Owensboro, Kentucky
