= Wayne Smith =

Wayne Smith may refer to:

== Politics ==
- Wayne Smith (diplomat) (1932–2024), U.S. diplomat who worked at the U.S. Embassy in Cuba
- Wayne Smith (Texas politician) (born 1943), member of the Texas House of Representatives
- Wayne Smith (Australian politician) (born 1952), member of the New South Wales Legislative Assembly

== Sports ==
- Wayne Smith (defensive back) (born 1957), National Football League, full name Wayne Lester Smith
- Wayne Smith (defensive lineman) (1950–2016), Canadian Football League
- Wayne Smith (offensive lineman) (born 1979), Canadian football, full name Wayne Anthony Smith
- Wayne Smith (rugby league) (born 1956), Australian rugby league player
- Wayne Smith (rugby union) (born 1957), New Zealand rugby coach and former rugby player
- Wayne Smith (ice hockey) (born 1943), NHL

== Other ==
- Wayne C. Smith (1901–1964), U.S. Army general
- Wayne Holloway-Smith, English poet
- Wayne T. Smith (born c. 1946), chairman and CEO of Community Health Systems
- Wayne Smith (musician) (1965–2014), Jamaican reggae musician
- George Wayne Smith (born 1955), bishop of the Episcopal Diocese of Missouri
- Wayne Smith (statistician), Chief Statistician of Canada, AKA Wayne R. Smith
- Wayne Smith (missionary) (1934–2004), founder of Friendship Force International
