= Keith Smith =

Keith Smith may refer to:

== Entertainment ==
- Keith Smith (writer) (1917–2011), Australian broadcaster, early screen personality and writer
- Keith Smith (actor) (1926–2008), British actor
- Keith A. Smith (born 1938), American artist and author
- Keith Randolph Smith, American Broadway, television and film actor active since 1986
- Keith Smith (guitarist), vocalist and guitarist for the band Anarchy Club
- Keith Smith (trumpeter) (1940–2008), British jazz trumpeter

== Sports ==
=== Baseball ===
- Keith Smith (outfielder) (born 1953), Major League Baseball outfielder
- Keith Smith (shortstop) (born 1961), Major League Baseball infielder for the New York Yankees

=== Gridiron football ===
- Keith Smith (American football coach), head football coach of the Eastern Illinois University Panthers in 1956
- Keith Smith (cornerback) (born 1980), American football player
- Keith Smith (fullback) (born 1992), American football fullback for the Atlanta Falcons
- Keith Smith (quarterback) (born 1976), American and Canadian football player

=== Other sports ===
- Keith Smith (Australian footballer) (1914–1997), Australian footballer
- Keith Smith (cricketer) (1929–2016), New Zealand cricketer
- Keith Smith (English footballer) (born 1940), English footballer
- Keith Smith (rugby) (1952–2006), English rugby player
- Keith Smith (basketball) (born 1964), American basketball player
- Keith Smith (ice hockey), Canadian ice hockey defenseman

== Other people ==
- Keith Smith (general) (1928–2012), American Marine Corps general
- Keith Macpherson Smith (1890–1955), Australian aviator
- Keith Smith (engineer) (1915–2011), Commonwealth Railways commissioner in Australia
- Keith Vincent Smith, Australian writer, historian and journalist
- Keith Smith (chemist) (born 1947), British organic chemist
