= Sinclair Smith =

Sinclair Smith may refer to:

- Sinclair Smith (cricketer) (born 1991), Bermudian cricketer
- Sinclair Smith (astronomer) (1899–1938), American astronomer
