= Regan Smith =

Regan Smith could refer to:

- Regan Smith (racing driver) (born 1983), American professional stock car racing driver and a pit reporter
- Regan Smith (swimmer) (born 2002), American competitive swimmer

== See also ==
- Ragan Smith (born 2000), American gymnast
