= Rex Smith (disambiguation) =

Rex Smith (born 1955) is an American actor and singer.

Rex Smith may refer to:

- Rex Smith (American football) (1896–1972), National Football League player
- Rex Smith (baseball) (1864–1895), born Henry W. Schmidt, professional baseball player
- Rex Smith (politician), former member of the Kentucky House of Representatives
- Rex Wakely Smith, South African rally driver and philatelist
- Rex Smith, editor of the Albany Times Union since 2002
- Rex Smith Aeroplane Company, an American aircraft manufacturer in College Park, Maryland
  - Rex Smith Biplane, a pioneering biplane
