= Roger Smith =

Roger Smith may refer to:

== Entertainment ==
- Roger Smith (actor) (1932–2017), American television and film actor and screenwriter
- Roger Craig Smith (born 1975), American voice actor
- Roger Guenveur Smith (born 1955), American writer, director, and actor
- Roger Smith, American musician, known as keyboarder of funk band Tower of Power
- Roger Smith (The Big O), lead character in The Big O
- Roger (American Dad!), the Smiths' "pet" alien in American Dad!

== Sports ==
- Roger Smith (footballer, born 1944), English footballer
- Roger Smith (footballer, born 1945), English footballer
- Roger Smith (New Zealand footballer)
- Roger Smith (field hockey) (born 1960), former Australian field hockey player
- Roger Smith (tennis) (born 1964), Bahamian tour tennis player

== Other ==
- Roger Smith (executive) (1925–2007), American businessman, CEO of GM
- Roger Smith (biologist), founder of the Millennium Seed Bank Project
- Roger Smith (journalist) (born 1951), Canadian television journalist
- Roger W. Smith (born 1970), British watchmaker
- Bird and Roger Smith, co-founders of the Scouting movement in the Malaysian state of Negeri Sembilan
