= Rashad Smith =

Rashad Smith may refer to:

- Rashad Smith (producer) (born 1972), American hip-hop and R&B artist
- Rashad Smith (American football) (born 1997), American football player
- Rashad Smith (footballer) (born 1996), Bajan football player
