= Roy Smith =

Roy Smith may refer to:

== Sports ==
- Roy Smith (boxer) (born 1961), British boxer
- Roy Smith (cricketer, born 1930) (1930-2020), English cricketer
- Roy Smith (cricketer, born 1910) (1910–1971), English cricketer
- Roy Smith (racing driver) (1944–2004), former Canadian NASCAR driver
- Roy Smith (1980s pitcher) (born 1961), American former Major League Baseball player
- Roy Smith (2000s pitcher) (born 1976), American former Major League Baseball player
- Roy Smith (footballer, born 1990), Costa Rican footballer
- Roy Smith (footballer, born 1936), English footballer with Hereford United, West Ham United and Portsmouth
- Roy Smith (Canadian football) (1920s—2008), Canadian football player
- Roy Smith (English footballer), see List of Wigan Athletic F.C. seasons
- Roy Smith (basketball) in 1977–78 Golden State Warriors season
- Roy Smith (motorcyclist) in 1954 Grand Prix motorcycle racing season
- Roy Smith (track athlete) in 2011 Pan American Junior Athletics Championships

== Politicians ==
- Roy Campbell Smith (1858–1940), Governor of Guam, 1916–1918
- Roy Smith (Australian politician) (1953/4–2010), member of the Shooters Party

== Others ==
- Roy Allen Smith (born 1954), American animator, film director and producer
- Roy Cornelius Smith, American operatic tenor
- Roy Forge Smith, British production designer
