= Rebecca Smith =

Rebecca Smith may refer to:

== Arts and entertainment ==
- Kate Harrington (poet) (Rebecca Harrington Smith, 1831–1917), American teacher and poet
- Carlene Carter (Rebecca Carlene Smith, born 1955), American country singer and songwriter

== Sports ==
- Rebecca Smith (footballer) (born 1981), New Zealand soccer player
- Rebecca Smith (swimmer), Canadian swimmer
- Becky Wiber (born 1959), Canadian swimmer born Rebecca Smith

== Other ==
- Rebecca Smith (murderer) (1807–1849), last British woman executed for infanticide
- Rebecca Smith (journalist) (fl. 1970s–2020s), American reporter
- Rebecca Smith (politician), British MP
- Rebecca Beach Smith (born 1949), U.S. federal judge
- Rebecca Smith (c. 1848–?), one of the Ascott Martyrs, English women imprisoned for 7-10 days in 1873 for their role in founding a branch of the National Union of Agricultural Workers
