= Ron Smith =

Ron or Ronald Smith may refer to:

== In sports ==
=== American football ===
- Ron Smith (defensive back) (1943–2013), American NFL player
- Ron C. Smith (born 1942), American football quarterback
- Ron Smith (wide receiver) (born 1956), American NFL player
- Ron Smith (defensive tackle) (born 1978), American NFL player

=== Association football ===
- Ron Smith (footballer, born 1929) (1929–2010), English professional footballer
- Ron Smith (footballer, born 1936) (1936–2026), English professional footballer
- Ron Smith (footballer, born 1949), professional football (soccer) player and coach

=== Australian rules football ===
- Ron Smith (Australian footballer, born 1914) (1914–1979), Australian footballer for Essendon and North Melbourne
- Ron Smith (Australian footballer, born 1917) (1917–1998), Australian footballer for Collingwood
- Ron Smith (Australian footballer, born 1934) (1934–2009), Australian footballer for Fitzroy
- Ron Smith (Australian footballer, born 1937), Australian footballer for Geelong

=== Other sports ===
- Ron Smith (ice hockey, born 1952), Canadian former professional hockey player and mayor
- Ron Smith (ice hockey, born 1944) (1944–2017), ice hockey coach
- Ron Smith (bridge) (1947–2024), American bridge player
- Ronald Smith (boxer) (1944–2011), British boxer
- Ronald Smith (cricketer) (1926–2001), English cricketer
- Ronnie Ray Smith (1949–2013), American athlete
- Ronnie Robinson (roller derby) (1939–2001), or Ronald Smith, roller derby skater

== Other ==
- Ron Smith (American poet) (21st century), American poet born in Georgia
- Ron Smith (comics) (1928–2019), British comic artist
- Ron Smith (Canadian author) (born 1943), Canadian author, poet and publishing house founder
- Ron Smith (radio host) (1941–2011), American talk radio show host in Baltimore
- Ron Smith (trade unionist) (1915–1999), British trade union leader
- Ronnie Smith (trade unionist) (born 1950s), Scottish trade union leader
- Ronald Smith (musician) (1922–2004), British pianist and composer
- Ronald Smith (politician) (1855–1909), Australian politician
- Ronald Allen Smith (born 1957), Canadian man on death row in Montana
- Ronald Bert Smith, Jr. (1971–2016), American murderer executed by Alabama
- Ron Smith (peace activist) (1921–1995), New Zealand public servant, communist and peace activist
- Ron Smith (firearms designer) (born 1951), American small arms designer
- Ronald L. Smith, American children's book author
- Ronald Smith (meteorologist), American professor of meteorology
- Ron Smith (television) (born 1966), American director, voice actor and animator
- Ronald B. Smith (1907–1984), American mechanical and consulting engineer
- Ronald Vivian Smith (1938–2020), Indian news reporter and author
