= Rusty Smith =

Rusty Smith may refer to:

- Rusty Smith (speed skater) (born 1979), American short track speed skater
- Rusty Smith (American football) (born 1987), American football quarterback
