= Ruth Smith =

Ruth Smith may refer to:

- Ruth Smith (artist) (1913–1958), Faroese painter
- Ruth Smith, 1996 co-winner of the Rose Mary Crawshay Prize for female scholars
- Ruth McLain Smith (born 1958), member of the bluegrass group The McLain Family Band
- Ruth P. Smith (1907–2010), American advocate for reproductive rights
- Ruth 'Rudi' Smith, supporting character on the British sitcom Gavin & Stacey

== See also ==
- Ruth Smeeth (born 1979), British Labour Party MP
