= Ryan Smith =

Ryan Smith may refer to:

== Politicians ==
- Ryan Smith (Australian politician) (born 1969), member for Warrandyte in the Victorian Legislative Assembly
- Ryan Smith (New Hampshire politician), Republican member of the New Hampshire House of Representatives
- Ryan Smith (Ohio politician) (born 1973), Republican member of the Ohio House of Representatives
- Ryan Smith (South African politician), member of the National Assembly of South Africa

== Sports ==
- Ryan Smith (cornerback, born 1985) (born 1985), American football player
- Ryan Smith (cornerback, born 1993) (born 1993), American football player
- Ryan Smith (wide receiver) (born 1991), Canadian football player
- Ryan Smith (footballer) (born 1986), English footballer
- Ryan Smith (rugby union, born 1979), Canadian rugby union player
- Ryan Smith (rugby union, born 1996), Australian rugby union player
- Ryan Smith (sports anchor) (born 1970), American sports anchor
- Ryan Smith (baseball) (born 1997), American minor league pitcher

== Others ==
- Ryan Smith (writer), writer for MADtv
- Ryan Smith, author of the webcomic Funny Farm
- Ryan Smith (businessman) (born 1978), co-founder of Qualtrics and owner of the Utah Jazz
- Ryan Smith (filmmaker)
- Induce (musician) (Ryan Smith), American DJ, record producer, singer, and writer

== See also ==
- Ryan Smyth (born 1976), ice hockey player
- Ryan Rowland-Smith (born 1983), Australian Major League Baseball pitcher
