= Red Smith =

Red Smith may refer to:

- Red Smith (third baseman) (1890–1966), 1910s baseball third baseman
- Red Smith (catcher) (1892–1970), Pittsburgh Pirates catcher, 1917–1918
- Red Smith (shortstop) (1899–1961), MLB shortstop in the 1925 season
- Red Smith (Negro leagues), Negro league baseball player
- Red Smith (American football/baseball) (1904–1978), New York Giants catcher in the 1927 season, Green Bay Packers coach
- Red Smith (American football) (1881–1931), Cumberland Bulldogs football center in the early 1900s
- Red Smith (sportswriter) (1905–1982), sportswriter
- Red Smith (coach) (1906–1959), American football, baseball, and track coach
- Floyd E. Smith (1912–1989), American labor union leader known as "Red Smith"

== See also ==
- Red Smith Award, an annual journalism award, given by the Associated Press Sports Editors (APSE)
- Red Smith Stakes, an annual Thoroughbred horse race, previously known as the Red Smith Handicap
