= Ross Smith =

Ross Smith may refer to:

== Australian rules footballers ==
- Ross Smith (Australian footballer, born 1942), Australian rules footballer for St Kilda
- Ross Smith (Australian footballer, born 1965), Australian rules footballer for North Melbourne

== Association footballers ==
- Ross Smith (Scottish footballer) (born 1992), Scottish association football player
- Ross Smith (soccer) (born 1980), Canadian association football player

== Other sportspeople ==
- Ross Smith (ice hockey) (born 1953), Canadian ice hockey player
- Ross Smith (badminton) (born 1985), Australian badminton player
- Ross Smith (darts player) (born 1989), English darts player
- Ross Smith (rugby union) (1929–2002), New Zealand rugby union player

== Others ==
- Ross Macpherson Smith (1892–1922), Australian aviator
- Ross Smith (politician) (1938–2023), Australian politician

== See also ==
- Ross Smith Secondary School, Australia, named after the aviator
