= Ira Harvey Smith =

American politician (1815–1883)

Member of the Kansas State Legislature
- In office 1861–1861

Personal details
- Born: August 20, 1815 Derby (now Seymour), Connecticut, U.S.
- Died: April 18, 1883 (aged 67) Topeka, Kansas, U.S.
- Party: Republican
- Spouse: Sarah J. Bartholomew (m. 1846)
- Children: 1
- Education: Yale College; Yale Divinity School
- Occupation: Politician; land agent; surveyor
- Known for: Member of the first Kansas State Legislature; founder and benefactor of Washburn College

Ira Harvey Smith (August 20, 1815 – April 18, 1883) was a Kansas state politician. He served in the Kansas Legislature in 1861.

== Early life ==
Ira Harvey Smith was born on August 20, 1815, in Derby (later Seymour), Connecticut, to Rachel (née Riggs) and Ira Smith. He attended Yale College for almost two years and graduated in 1841. He studied three years at the Yale Divinity School and graduated in 1845.

== Career ==
In the fall of 1844, Smith became licensed to preach by the South Litchfield Association. He was ordained pastor of the Congregational Church in North Haven, Connecticut, on February 11, 1846. Due to failing health, he was dismissed from his charge in March 1848. He then spent five months in residence at the Massachusetts General Hospital in Boston. He then took a job as pastor in Prospect, Connecticut, for a short time. From the spring of 1853 to the summer of 1854, he lived in California and worked for a mining company. In the fall of 1854, he emigrated to the Kansas Territory. He first lived in Robinson.

Smith worked as an assistant in the surveying of the boundary line between Kansas and Nebraska. He also worked as a land agent. In 1858, he became deputy U.S. surveyor and worked for the public survey of the territory. He was a Republican. From the winter to spring 1861, he served in the first Kansas State Legislature, representing Brown County. In the fall of 1861, he was appointed as receiver of the U.S. Land Office. He first worked in Kickapoo and then worked in Atchison.

Smith continued as receiver until the Atchison and Lecompton offices were consolidated. He then became register of the U.S. Land Office in Topeka in January 1864. He remained there until the summer of 1873. In 1876, he was associated with development in San Juan country in southwestern Colorado. He returned to his home in Topeka in 1880. He was a founder of Washburn College in Topeka and served as secretary of its board of trustees. He donated US$1,000 to the construction of Washburn College's main college building.

== Personal life ==
Smith married Sarah J. Bartholomew, daughter of William Bartholomew, of Wolcott on February 26, 1846. They had one son. He was a member of the First Congregational Church of Topeka.

Smith died of heart disease on April 18, 1883, in Topeka.
