= Rupert Smith (disambiguation) =

Rupert Smith (born 1943) is a retired British Army officer and author.

Rupert Smith may also refer to:

- Rupert Smith (novelist) (born 1960), American-born English author and journalist
- Rupert Smith (American football) (1897–1959), American football and baseball player
- Rupert Jasen Smith (1951–1989), American artist

== See also ==
- Rupert Alec-Smith (1913–1983), English army officer and lord lieutenant of Humberside
