= Katherine Smith =

Katherine, Katharine, or Catherine Smith may refer to:

- Catharina Smith or Catherine Smith (fl. c. 1807), English novelist and actress
- Cat Smith (born 1985), British Labour Party politician
- Catherine Smith, Baroness Smith of Cluny (born 1973), British lawyer and government minister
- Catherine Drummond Smith (1888–1979), Australian geologist
- Karen Zerby (born 1946), real name Katherine Smith
- Katharine Smith Salisbury (1813–1900), sister to Latter Day Saints founder Joseph Smith
- Katherine Smith (Navajo activist) (1918–2017), Navajo activist, cultural educator, and resistor
- Katherine Smith (footballer) (born 1998), Australian rules footballer
- Katherine Douglas Smith (1878 – after 1947), British suffragette
- Katharine Smith Reynolds (1880–1924), née Smith, philanthropist and wife of tobacco tycoon R. J. Reynolds
- Catherine Smith (died 1944), wife of Al Smith and first lady of New York

== See also ==
- Cath Smith, character in Gavin & Stacey
- Katharine Smyth (fl. 2019), American memoirist
- Kathy Smith (disambiguation)
- Kathryn Smith (disambiguation)
- Kate Smith (disambiguation)
- Kathleen Smith (disambiguation)
- Kay Smith (disambiguation)
