= Kate Smith (disambiguation) =

Kate Smith (1907–1986) was an American singer.

Kate or Katie Smith may also refer to:

- Kate Wilson-Smith (born 1979), Australian badminton player
- Kate Smith (presenter), former Northern Irish television presenter and journalist
- Kate Smith (diplomat), former British ambassador to Greece
- Kate Mary Smith (1847–1932), businesswoman from Brisbane, Queensland
- Kate Douglas Wiggin (1856–1923), née Smith, American educator, author and composer, wrote the novel Rebecca of Sunnybrook Farm
- Katie Smith (born 1974), American basketball player and coach
- Katie Kehm Smith (1868–1895), American freethought lecturer and organizer

== See also ==
- Katherine Smith (disambiguation)
- Kathleen Smith (disambiguation)
- Kathy Smith (disambiguation)
- Katy Simpson Smith, American novelist
