= Woolsey Teller =

American atheist rationalist writer and white supremacist

Woolsey Teller (March 22, 1890 – March 11, 1954) was an American atheist rationalist writer and white supremacist.

== Biography ==
Teller was born in Brooklyn, New York. He was an associate editor of the leading Freethought journal The Truth Seeker of New York City, where his cousin Charles Lee Smith was editor. He was a member of the American Association for the Advancement of Atheism. universe.

Besides being a leader in the American Freethought movement, Teller was a white supremacist, and favored eugenics, causing the movement to split on this issue and losing The Truth Seeker subscribers when its editors backed him.

James Hervey Johnson, the former editor of The Truth Seeker, and essayist Woolsey Teller were among the worst offenders. In 1945 the Truth Seeker Company published Teller's Essays of an Atheist. Teller wrote five especially racist essays: "Grading the Races," "Brains and Civilization," "There Are Superior Races," "Shall We Breed Rationally?" and "Natural Selection and War." In "Grading the Races," Teller discusses an essay by the African American atheist and historian John G. Jackson (1907-93) called "Ethiopia and the Origin of Civilization." Teller calls Jackson "a mulatto" and argues that "the ancient Egyptians were dominantly Caucasian." Moreover, he argues that the "Caucasian skull, anatomically considered, is the highest in the world."

Teller argued that the white race is superior. with a bigger brain size compared to the black race, which he labeled genetically inferior, always citing scientific justification. Though an Anti-Semite, he greatly admired Albert Einstein for his rejection of religion. Teller has been described as a "leading freethought bigot".

In his essay "Mysticism in Modern Physics" in Essays of an Atheist, Teller disputes the idea that modern physics has dispensed with materialism, claiming that excessive use of mathematics has turned it into metaphysics:

Clearly, then, the "splitting" of the atom has in no way "exploded" the teaching of materialists. Matter is as indestructible as ever, and is so acknowledged in every text book on chemistry and physics. Not even the most mystical of modern physicists can deny this.

The whole plea for a metaphysical "physics" rests on the erroneous idea that since we cannot predict certain activities far down in the atom, materialism is ruled out. Our inability to register all movements in the sub-atomic world merely means that our implements of detection have not yet been brought to a proper state of precision. We are here dealing with rarefied forms of matter or infinitely small particles, whose complicated motions are beyond the range of our most sensitive instruments. We are facing a world of infinitesimal particles, moving about at terrific speeds and in variable orbits. How small these individual parts are may be visualized from the fact that the hydrogen atom alone weighs only 1.662x10-24 grammes, while the nucleus itself has a diameter of only a millionth of a millionth of an inch.

In his essay "Miscellaneous Notes" in Essays of an Atheist, Teller ridicules mathematics as a way to become wiser in itself:

DOES mathematics, the science of accurate calculation, lead to accuracy in thinking? Many say "yes"; this unregenerated plebian says "No". Some of the world's most illustrious "screwballs" in matters of religion have been excellent mathematicians.

Tycho Brahe and Kepler both believed in astrology. "Tycho Brahe was from his fifteenth year devoted to astrology," says Morris Jastrow, "and adjoining his observatory at Uranienburg the astronomer-royal of Denmark had a laboratory built in order to study alchemy, and it was only a few years before his death that he finally abandoned astrology." Kepler "peopled the planets with souls and genii", and put "an astrological interpretation on the disappearance of the brilliant star of 1572, which Tycho had observed."

Mathematicians of distinction have consulted mediums, talked and walked, arm in arm, with ghosts, and believed in haunted houses. Nothing in mathematics can prevent a man from being or becoming superstitious. There is no reason why a Christian Scientist cannot learn trigonometry or master calculus. A man who has invented a bomb-sight or calculated an eclipse may, for all we know, be eating his Savior at this minute, or be carrying a St. Christopher medal on the steering wheel of his car.

In October 1947 Teller debated James D. Bales on the existence of God.

== Publications ==
- Evolution--or McCann (Truth Seeker Company, 1922)
- 'The Atheism of Astronomy (Truth Seeker Company, 1938)
- Essays of an Atheist (Truth Seeker Company, 1945)
- Bales-Teller Debate: The Existence Of God (1948)
- Hell: A Christian Doctrine (Truth Seeker Company, 1953) [with Marshall Gauvin and Herbert Cutner]
