= Gauvin =

Gauvin (/ˈɡɔːvɪn/, French pronunciation: [govɛ̃]) is a surname. Notable people with this surname include:

- Anthony Gauvin (born 1973), French football player
- Axel Gauvin (born 1944), French author
- Crystal Gauvin, American archer
- Gauvin Alexander Bailey, American-Canadian art historian
- George Alfred Gauvin (1863–1933), Canadian photographer
- Jean Gauvin (1945–2007), Canadian politician
- Joël Gauvin (born 1939), French ice hockey player
- Karina Gauvin, Canadian soprano
- Lise Gauvin (born 1940), Canadian writer
- Marshall Gauvin (1881–1978), Canadian atheist author and speaker
- Mickey Gauvin, drummer with the International Submarine Band
- Robert Gauvin, Canadian politician
- Réal Gauvin (born 1935), Canadian politician
- Valérie Gauvin (born 1996), French football player
- William-Henry Gauvin (1913–1994), Canadian chemical engineer

== See also ==
- Cheval Gauvin, legendary horse
- Gauvin, Quebec, Canada
