= William Landon Oliphant =

American preacher and polemicist (1900–1947)

- Born: February 23, 1900; Mounds, Indian Territory, Sapulpa, Oklahoma
- Died: May 7, 1947 (aged 47); Searcy, Arkansas

William Landon Oliphant (23 February 1900 – 7 May 1947) was an American Protestant preacher and polemicist.

== Biography ==
William was born into a non-religious family, his parents were named Edgar and Ida. During his studies at High School, William's family changed their place of residence several times: Oklahoma, New Mexico, Oklahoma, Oaks. While in New Mexico, William found a copy of the Bible in a shepherd's hut. His family began to study the book, after which they began to lead a religious life. After graduating from High School at Oaks, Olyphant attended Western Oklahoma Christian College. Later William went to the University of Oklahoma, where he did Pre-Law work, eventually graduating from Thomas Jefferson High School in Dallas, Texas, and was accepted into the State Bar of Texas. A year later, Thomas Jefferson High School awarded him a JD degree.

He married Bertha Thorp (15 November 1899–16 November 1996) on 4 October 1817. They had two daughters: Eleana Mae Oliphant, and Landa Lois McCool. Oliphant was a Minister, Oak Cliff Church of Christ, Dallas, Texas.

Oliphant is known for his debates on the topic of religion. When he was about 15 years old, he conducted his first debate with a Jehovah's Witness. In January 1935 in Dallas, Oliphant held a debate with John Richard Rice, a Baptist evangelist and pastor. Most notably, he debated Charles Lee Smith, President of the American Association for the Advancement of Atheism of New York City, on August 15 and 16, 1929. This debate was published four times in book form from 1929 to 2013.

== Works ==
- The way of truth. / by Horace W Busby, W L Oliphant. 1927
- A Debate Between W. L. Oliphant, Minister, Oak Cliff Church of Christ, Dallas, Texas and Charles Smith, President, American Association for the Advancement of Atheism, New York City: Held in the Church of Christ, Shawnee, Oklahoma, August 15 and 16, 1929 / F. L. Rowe, 177 p. 1929.
  - 2nd edition: Gospel Advocate Company, Nashville, Tennessee. 177 p. 1952.
  - 3rd edition: M. Lynwood Smith Publications, Wesson, Mississippi. 177 p. 1983
  - 4th edition: CreateSpace Independent Publishing Platform. 180 p. 2013
- The Oliphant-Rice Debate On 1. Return Of The Jews To Jerusalem, 2. Personal Reign Of Christ At Jerusalem, 3. Baptism For Remission Of Sins, 4. Apostasy : Conducted At Dallas, Texas, January 15-18, 1935 And January 22-25, 1935; Stenographically Reported By / By W. L. Oliphant; John R. Rice. 572 p. – Hardcover, 1935
- What is God like? : And other sermons. / Austin, Texas: Firm Foundation Pub. House, [1937?]
- Sermons of W.l. Oliphant Volume 1, DeHoff Publications, 172 p. (January 1, 1957)
- "Truth in love" / Dallas, Texas : [publisher not identified], [195-?]
