= Gauvin & Gentzel =

Canadian photographic studio

- Industry: Photography, film
- Founded: 1892
- Founder: Adolphe E. Gentzel, George A. Gauvin

Gauvin & Gentzel was a Canadian photography company established in Halifax, Nova Scotia.

== History ==
The firm of Gauvin & Gentzel, specializing in commercial photography, was established by the early 1890s in Halifax, Nova Scotia. Adolphe E. Gentzel and George Alfred Gauvin, amateur photographers and founding members of the Halifax Camera Club, formed the partnership. Their photographic studio, known as the Elite Studio, was located at 18 Spring Garden.

At the 1894 Nova Scotia Agricultural Exhibition and Industrial Fair (Sept. 25–29), their Elite Studio display was praised for its artistry and received a special award.

In 1896, Gauvin & Gentzel photographed James Wilberforce Longley, Attorney General of Nova Scotia. Throughout 1897, they expanded and renovated the Elite Studio to accommodate new photographic methods and styles. In December 1897, the studio purchased the sole right to produce bas-relief photographs in Halifax.

In 1901, they documented a detachment of New Brunswick recruits under Lieut. C. W. W. McLean for the South African Constabulary. Sir Charles Tupper's photo was taken in 1902. The studio also photographed Canadian author Margaret Marshall Saunders throughout the 1900s.

Relocating to Winnipeg, Manitoba, in 1905, A.E. Gentzel maintained the business under the name "Gauvin Gentzel". The Halifax branch remained in operation for several decades under G.A. Gauvin.

The portrait studio took a photo of the Archbishop of Halifax, Edward Joseph McCarthy, on 2 April 1908. Albert Audley Thompson's photo was taken by the Halifax studio in 1910. During the summer of 1912 in Winnipeg, Gauvin, Gentzel, & Co. photographed the officers of the Winnipeg Rotary Club. The Nova Scotia photographers attended the unveiling of the Halifax Memorial Tower on 14 August 1912. Gauvin & Gentzel later employed Wallace R. MacAskill as a printer for their Elite Studio in 1916. He worked there until 1919 and photographed the aftermath of the Halifax Explosion. A photograph of Canadian diplomat Charles Jost Burchell was taken by the Gauvin & Gentzel firm in 1925.

A department for amateur developing, printing, and enlarging was opened at the Halifax studio in May 1924.

George Gauvin, the head of the firm, died on 18 July 1933.

== Gallery ==
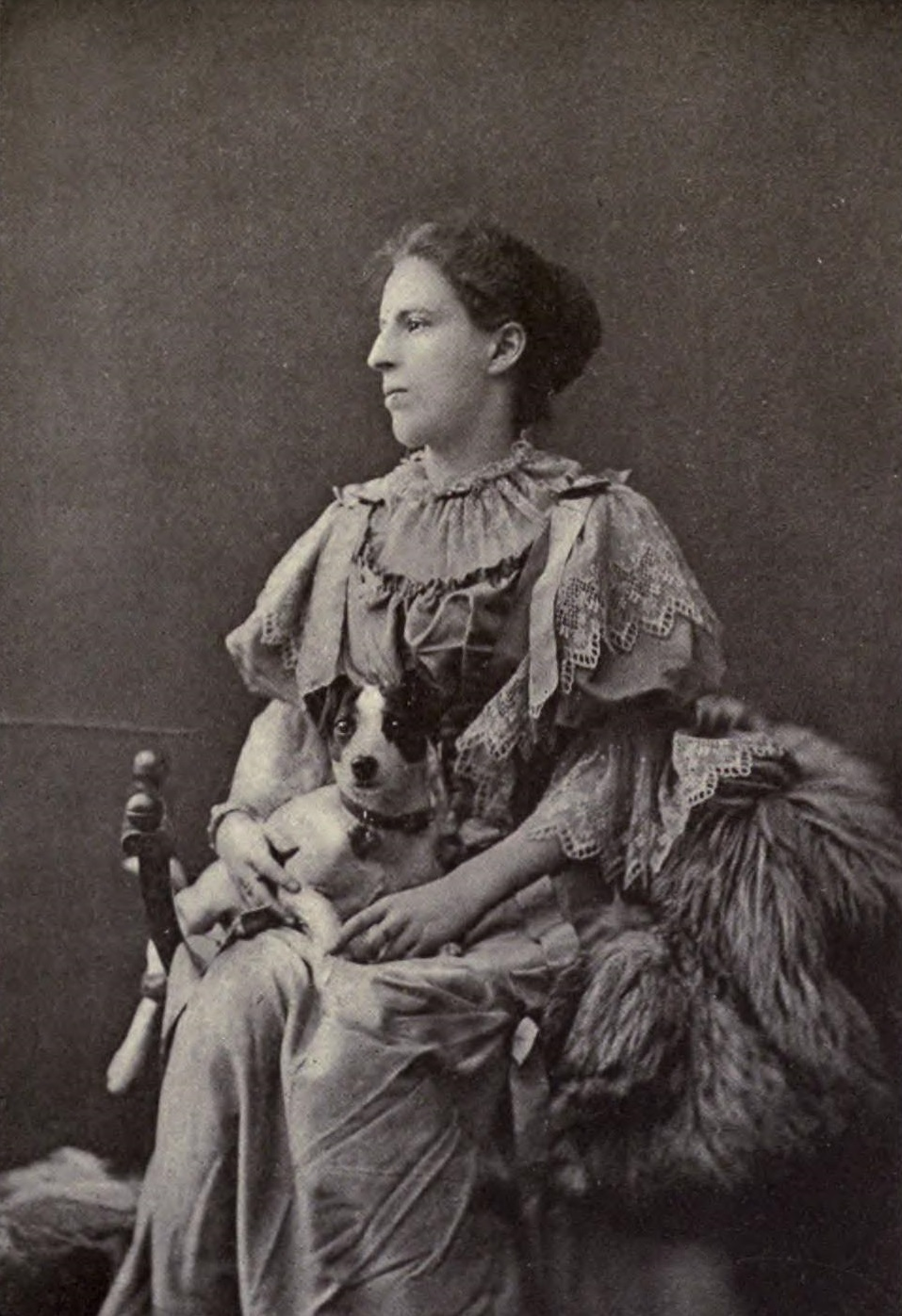
Portrait of Margaret Marshall Saunders

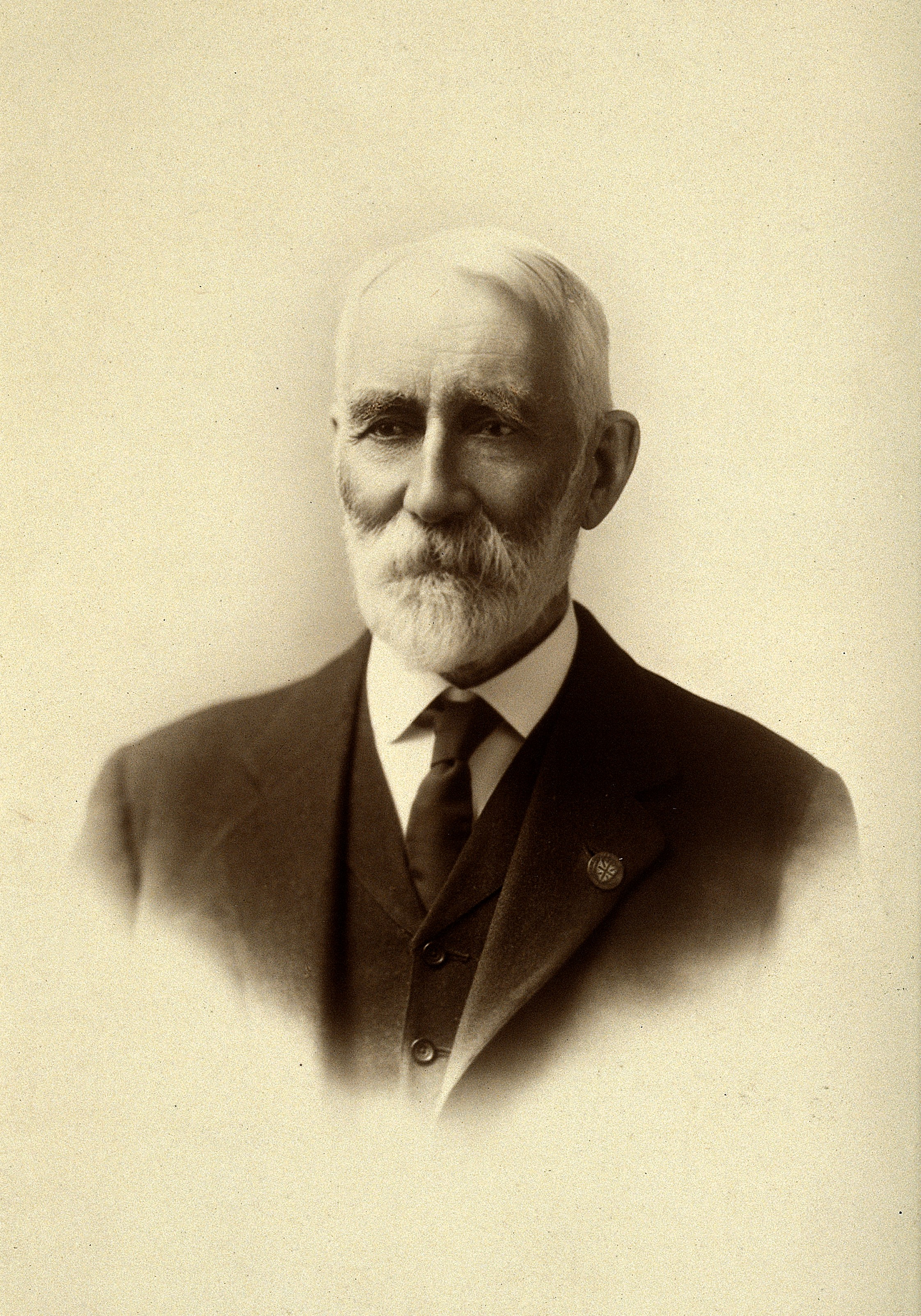
Portrait of John Stewart

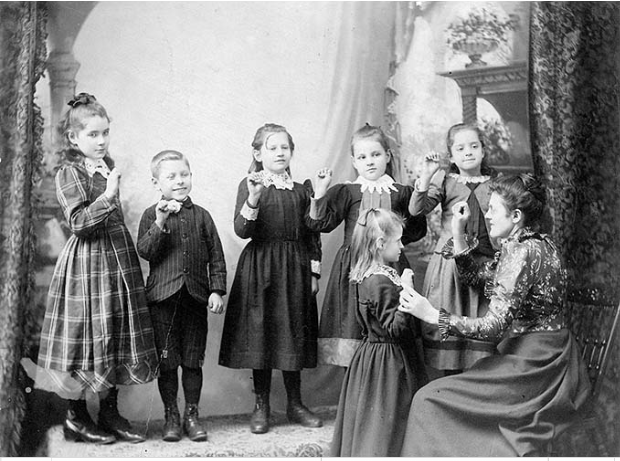
Halifax School For Deaf

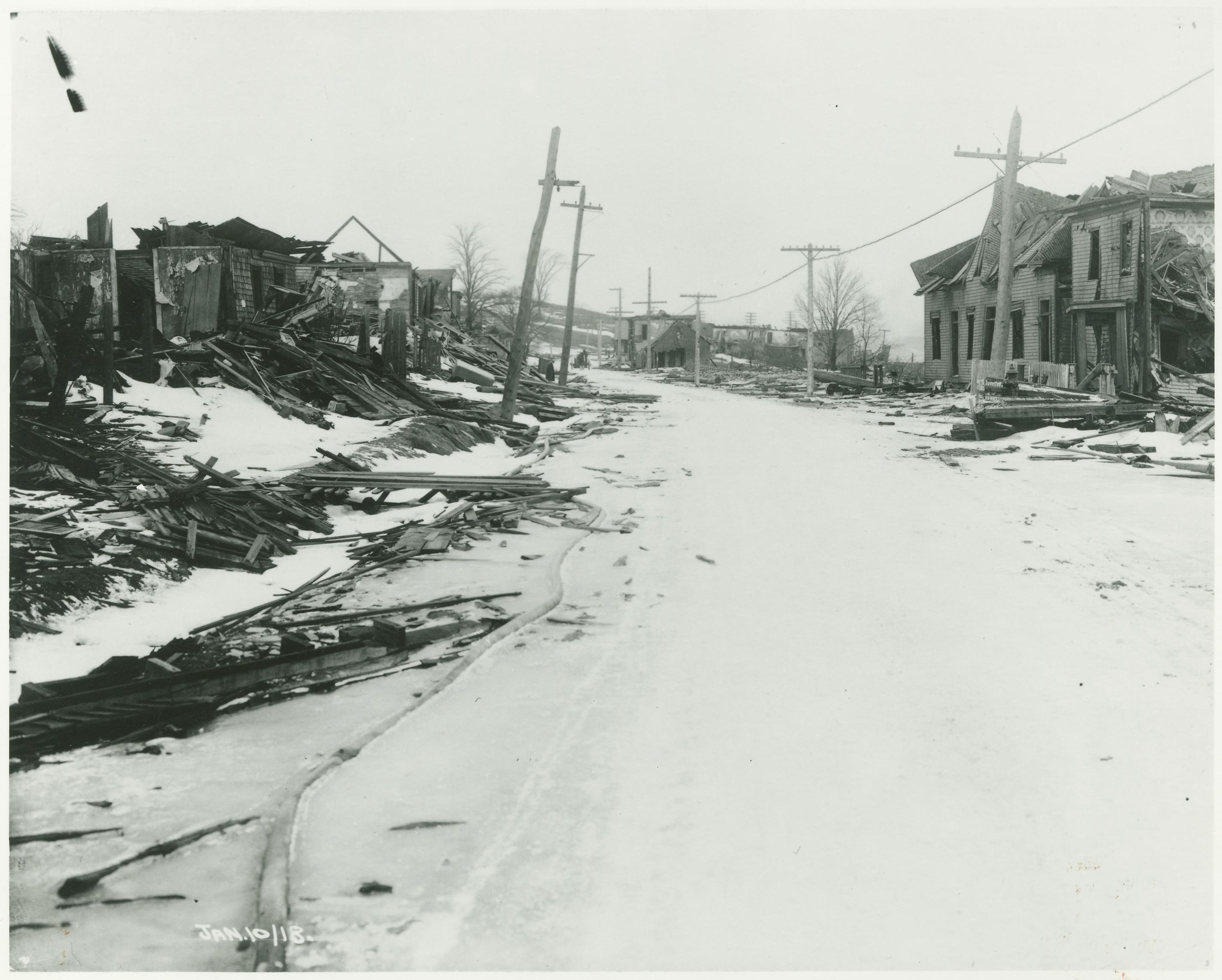
Campbell Road (later Barrington Street) looking north from Rector Street after the explosion

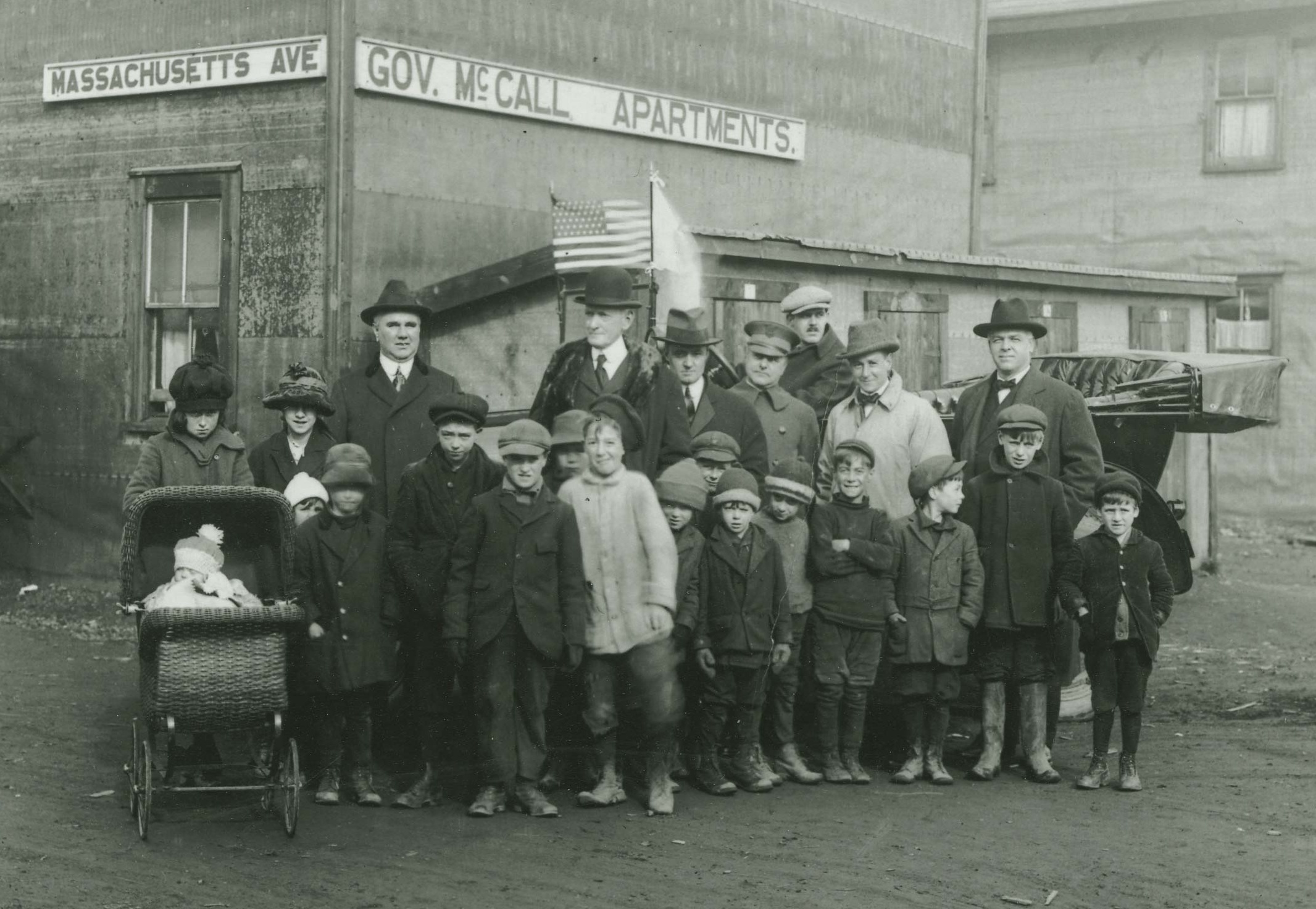
Visit of Governor Samuel W. McCall of Massachusetts to Halifax, Nova Scotia

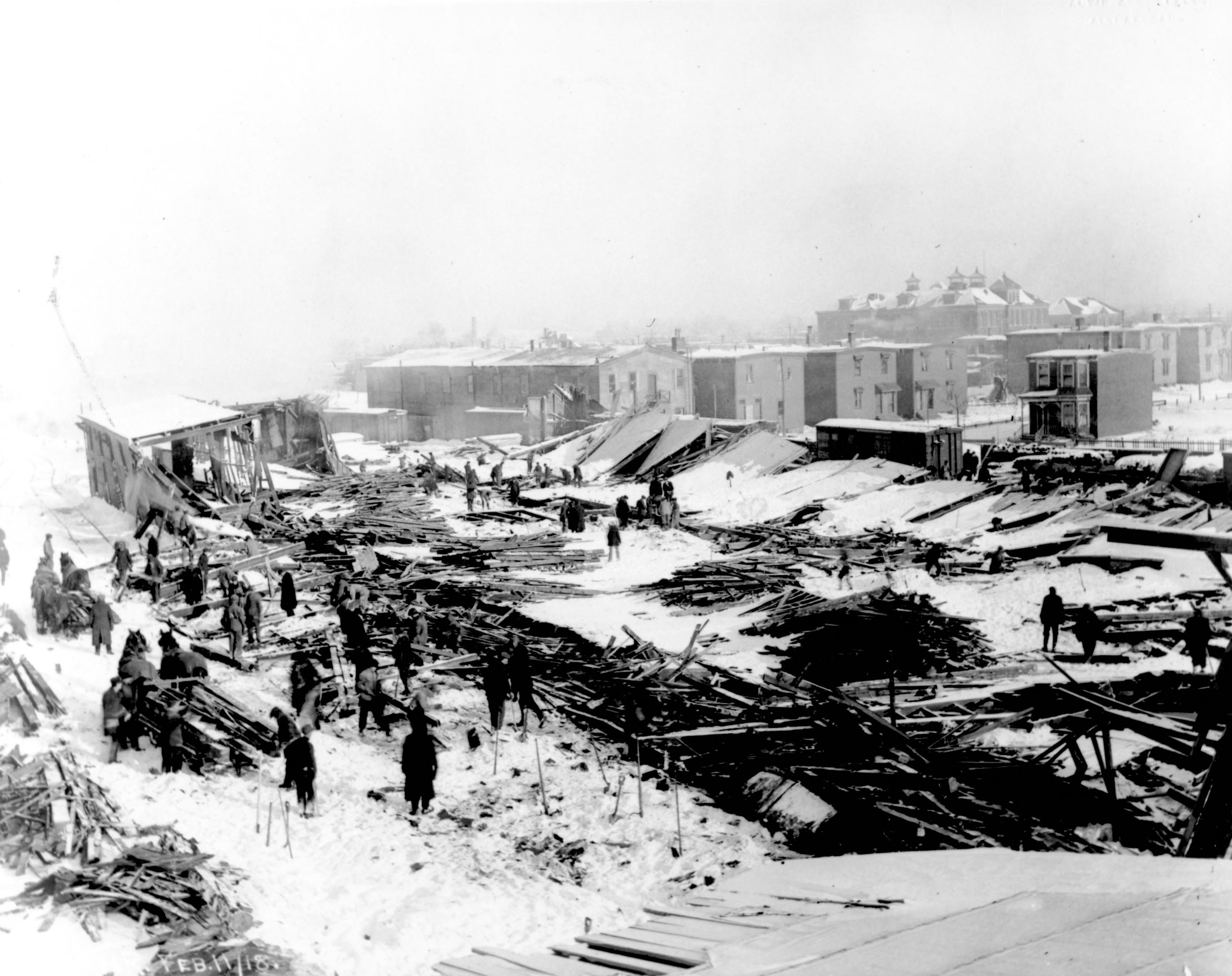
Collapsed buildings of Nova Scotia Car Works on Clifton Street near St. Albans Street, Halifax, with Bloomfield School
