= James Jefferson Davis Hall =

American street preacher (1864–1951)

James Jefferson Davis Hall, (1864-1951) sometimes known by supporters as "Dad Hall," was an American Episcopalian street preacher known for his large telephone ministry, which according to a Time article allowed him to preach directly to a record 140,000 people over 20 months.

== Biography ==
James Jefferson Davis Hall was born in 1864 in Greenville, Alabama during the American Civil War. His family was poor and he had ten siblings. His father James Woodward Hall served in Confederate Army as a physician. He rarely had shoes until he was eighteen, and at age 20 he quit farming to become a teacher. When he was 28 in 1892, he left his job again to enter the Protestant Episcopal Theological Seminary in Alexandria, Virginia. After graduating he preached in small Alabama towns and in 1904 was appointed Episcopal chaplain for two prison camps in Pratt City and Flattop outside Birmingham, Alabama. Hall became well known among evangelists and in 1908 was invited to Philadelphia to take charge of the Vine Street Galilee Mission.

Eventually he went to New York City where he became a street preacher supported by older, wealthy, mostly Southern, Fundamentalist women. He would offer his phone number to preach over the phone, and eventually built up a client base. He later said his telephone ministry started after preaching to a wrong number call, but as it grew he became known as the "telephone preacher" who supporters called "Dad Hall."

He had a mission called St. Paul's House in New York, with paid staff to answer phone calls, and with sister missions in different cities. According to a 1942 Time magazine article, Hall set a record for preaching by preaching to 140,000 people over 20 months, although some of them were prank calls. He was also known for feuding with atheist Charles Lee Smith; and he took public stands in favor of vegetarianism, prohibition, saving banks, osteopathy, and women preachers; but opposed church suppers, vaccinations, bingo, aspirin, and tobacco.

He died in Manhattan at the age of 86 after a 2000 mile preaching tour.
