= Edward McCarthy =

Edward McCarthy may refer to:

- Edward McCarthy (police officer), Los Angeles Police Department chief of police
- Edward A. McCarthy, American Roman Catholic archbishop
- Edward Joseph McCarthy, Canadian Roman Catholic archbishop
- Ed McCarthy, Irish Professional Footballer
