= Mary Wicks Bennett =

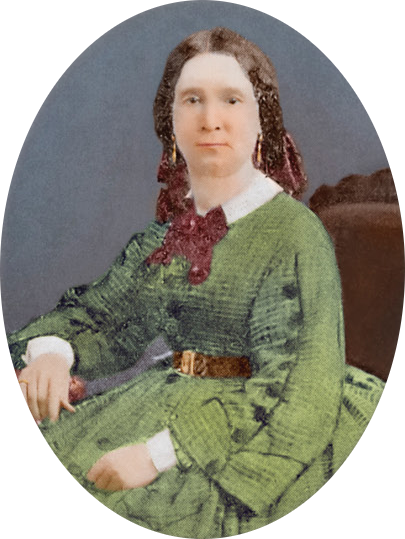
- Born: April 28, 1819; Reading
- Died: July 31, 1898 (aged 79)
- Spouse(s): D. M. Bennett

Mary Wicks Bennett (April 28, 1819 – July 31, 1898) was an American Shaker apostate and magazine editor.

Mary Wicks was born on April 28, 1819 in Reading, New York, one of ten children of Job Wicks and Polly Prentiss. In 1824, the Wicks family joined the Shaker community at Watervliet, probably due to poverty. In January 1825, Mary and her brother Thomas were moved away from their family to the Shaker community in New Lebanon.

During the Era of Manifestations, Wicks participated in a number of activities that were thought to manifestations of the spirit world, such as spirit visions from an angel named Sha Ka Na La Vinda. In 1843, she and Semantha Fairbanks created a series of "sacred sheets", Shaker gift drawings made in pen and ink. Some of those drawings were covered in a kind of sacred writing that has been described as "visual glossolalia."

In September 1846, she and her future husband DeRobigne Mortimer Bennett and another Shaker couple secretly fled New Lebanon permanently. They married and engaged in a number of failed business ventures over the years.

In 1873, they founded a freethought publication called The Truth Seeker. The reputation of the magazine grew but it also ran afoul of the Comstock Laws and D. M. Bennett was jailed for 11 months, forcing Mary Bennett to take over as editor and publisher. He died in 1884 and she sold the magazine to Eugene Macdonald the next year.

== Gallery ==
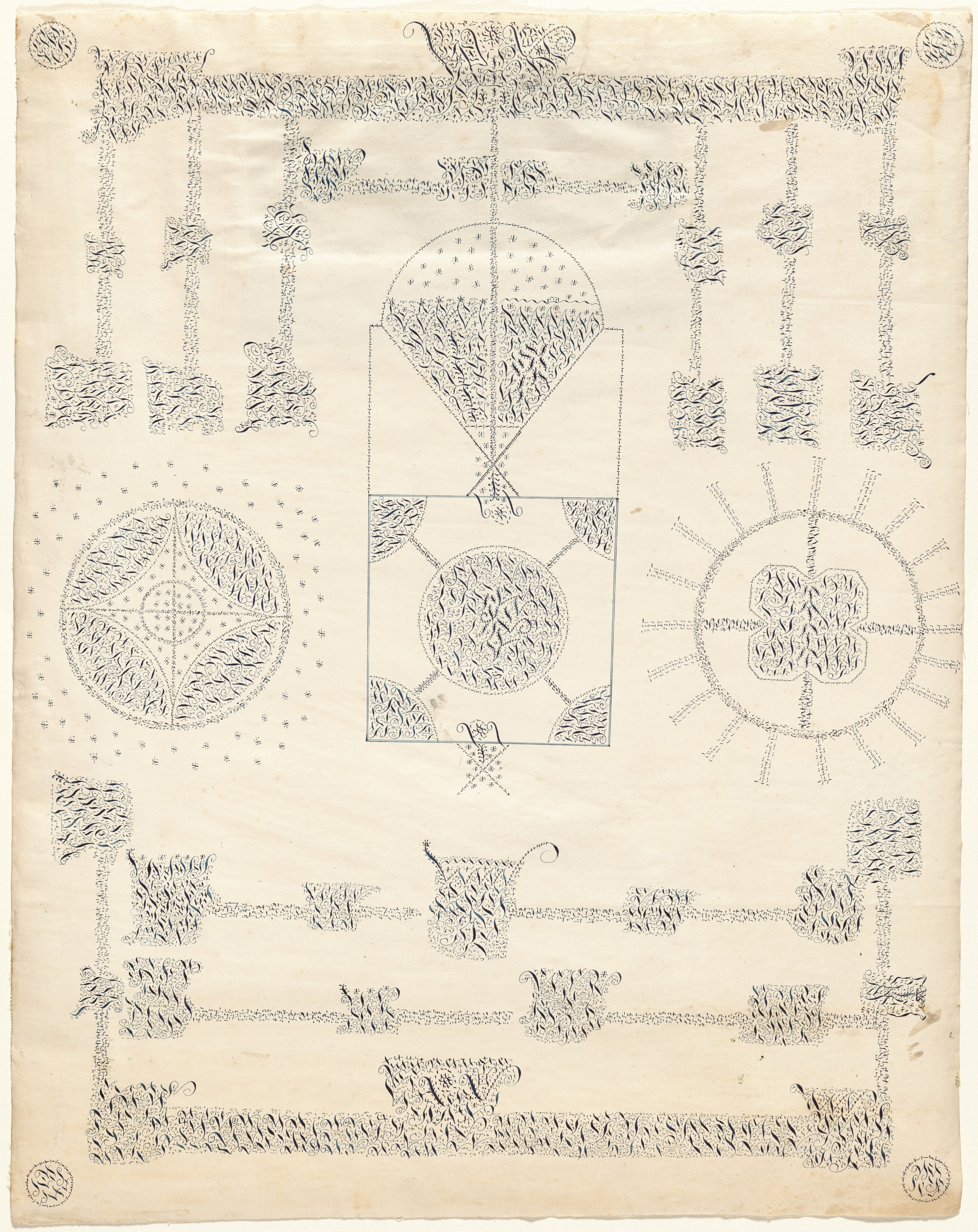
A sacred sheet sent from holy mother wisdom by her angel of many signs

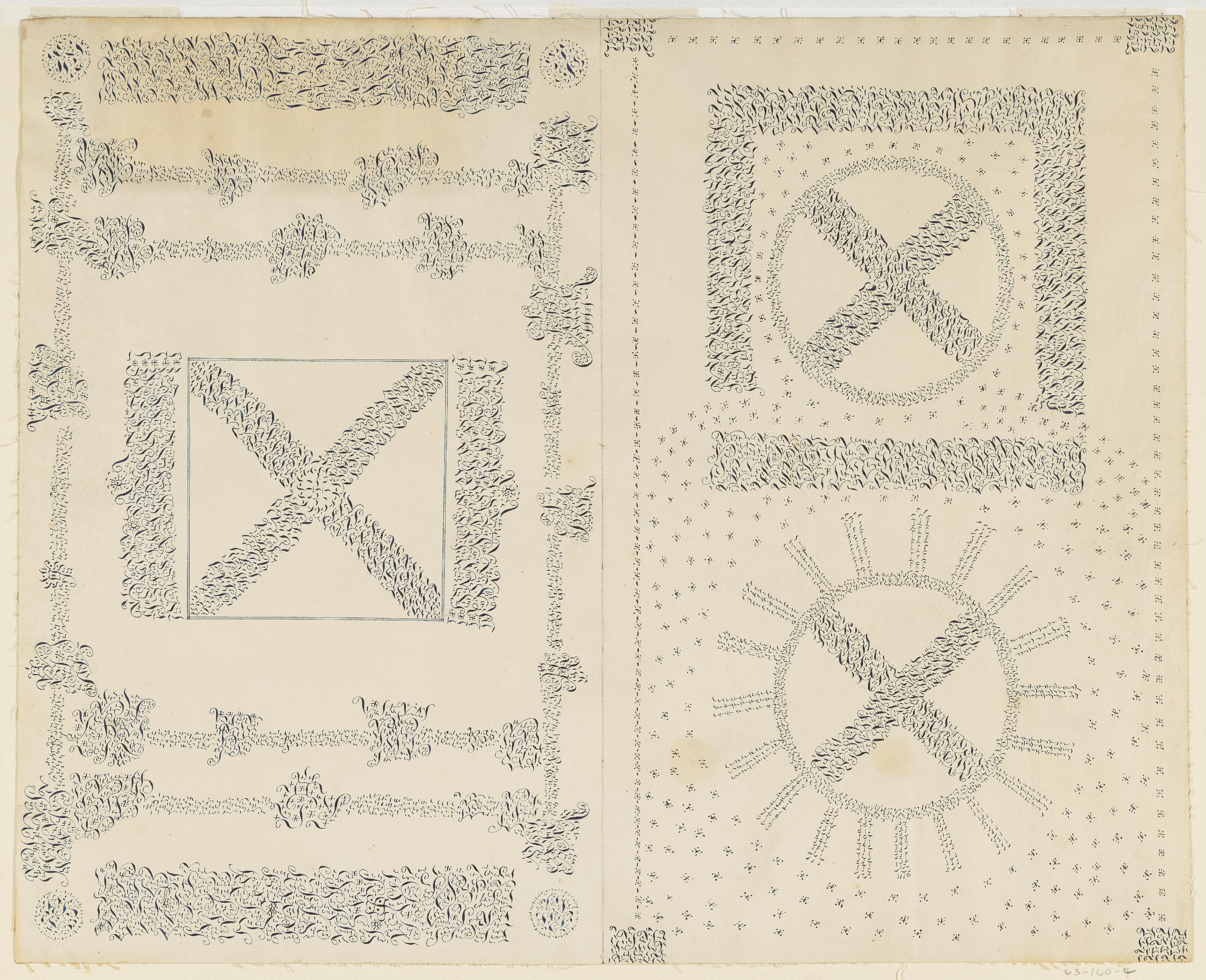
