= Michael Hannan (bishop) =

- Archbishop of Halifax, Nova Scotia
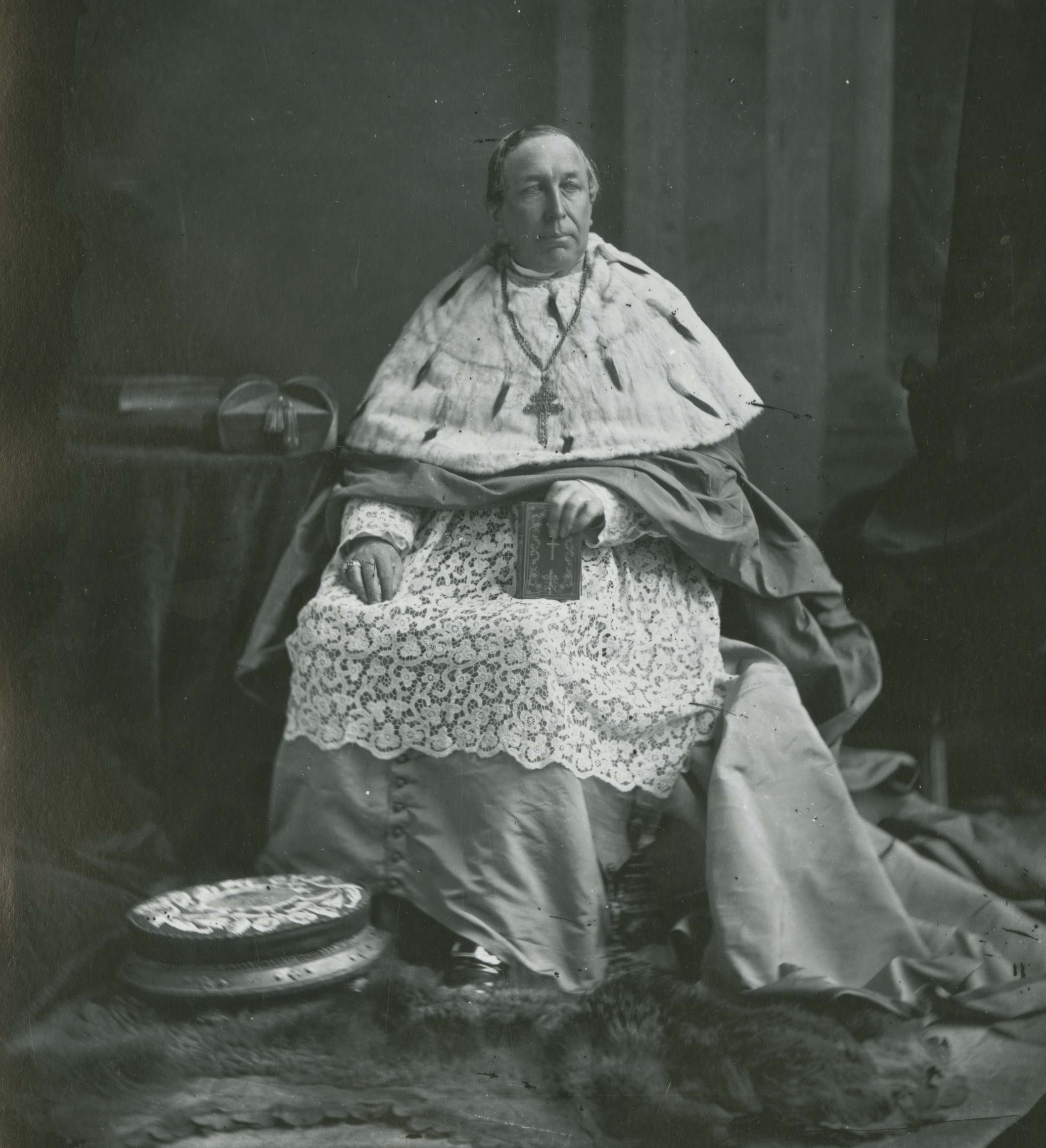
- Archdiocese: Halifax
- Installed: 1877
- Term ended: 1882
- Predecessor: Thomas-Louis Connolly
- Successor: Cornelius O'Brien

Orders
- Ordination: 1845

Personal details
- Born: 20 July 1821 Kilmallock, County Limerick, United Kingdom of Great Britain and Ireland
- Died: 17 April 1882 (aged 60) Halifax, Nova Scotia

Michael Hannan (20 July 1821 – 17 April 1882) was a Roman Catholic priest and archbishop.

Born in County Limerick, Ireland, Hannan came to Halifax in 1840 to teach and finish his studies for the priesthood. Hannan was ordained by Archbishop William Walsh in 1845 and became a parish priest in Bermuda which was part of the Roman Catholic Archdiocese of Halifax at the time. He returned to Nova Scotia in 1847 and served in increasingly important positions within the archdiocese.

He served as archbishop from 1877 to 1882 and was followed by Cornelius O'Brien.
