= Kathy Smith =

Kathy, Kathie, Cathy or Cathie Smith may refer to:

- Cathy Smith (1947–2020), Canadian convicted of involuntary manslaughter in the death of John Belushi
- Cathy Smith (cricketer) (born 1961), Australian cricketer
- Kathy Smith (fitness personality) (born 1951), personal trainer
- Kathy Smith (filmmaker) (born 1963), Australian independent filmmaker
- Kathy Smith (Australian politician) (1948/1949–2017), Australian politician in the New South Wales Legislative Assembly
- Kathy Smith (American politician), member of the Fairfax County Board of Supervisors
- Kathy Smith, Californian singer-songwriter who performed at the Isle of Wight Festival 1970

== See also ==
- Cathy Gilliat-Smith (born 1981), English field hockey player
- Kate Smith (disambiguation)
- Katherine Smith (disambiguation)
- Kathleen Smith (disambiguation)
- Katie Smith (born 1974), basketball player
