= Katie Kehm Smith =

American academic

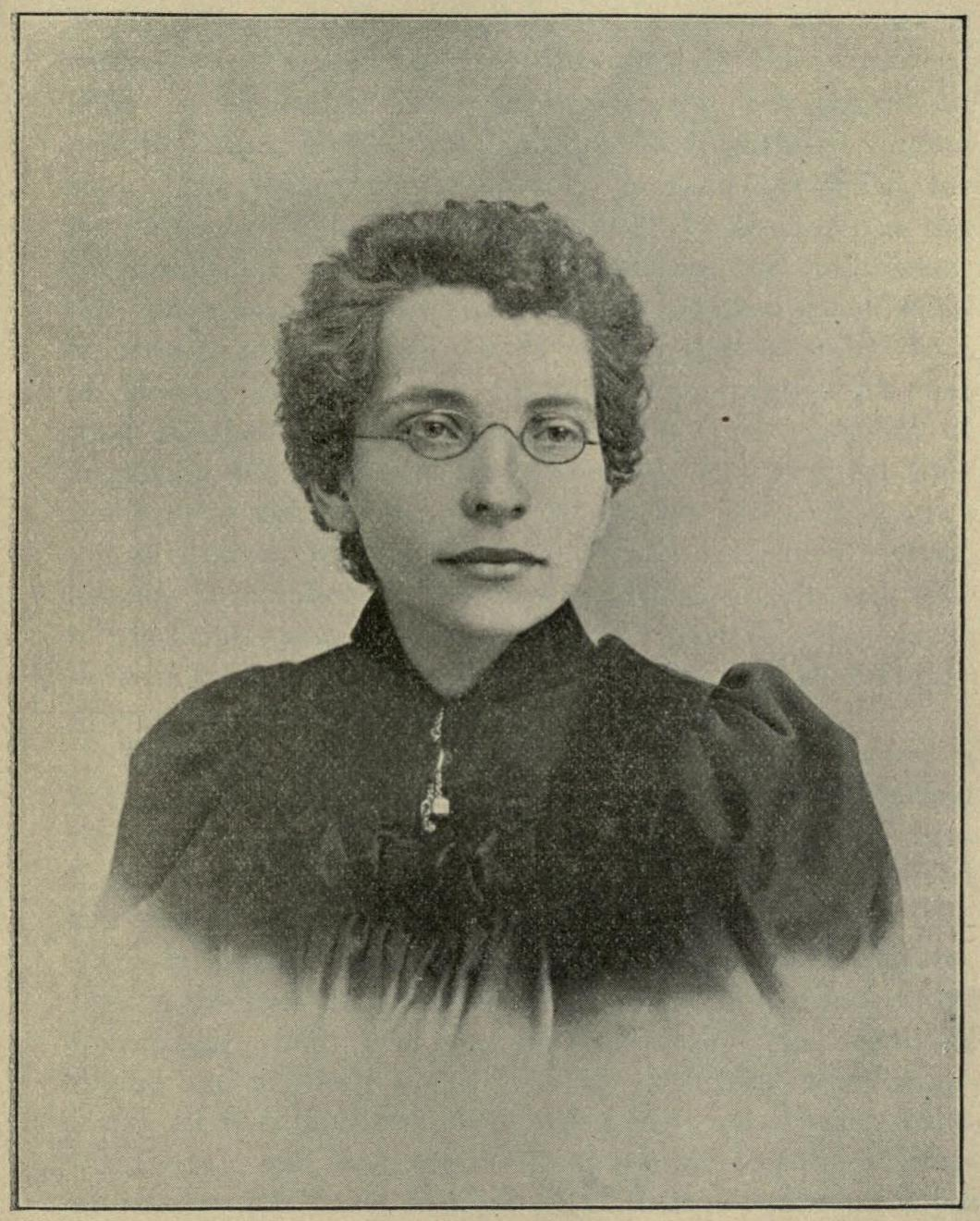
- Born: Katie Kehm; 1868; Warsaw, Illinois
- Died: 18 September 1895; John Day, Oregon
- Occupation(s): Teacher, lecturer, organizer
- Organization: Oregon State Secular Union
- Known for: Founding the First Secular Church of Portland and its Secular Sunday School
- Spouse: D.W. Smith

Katie Kehm Smith (1868 – 18 September 1895) was an American freethought lecturer and organizer. In Samuel Porter Putnam's 400 Years of Freethought, published a year before her death, Putnam described Smith as "Probably the youngest prominent lecturer in the Freethought ranks". She initiated the First Secular Church of Portland, followed by its Secular Sunday School.

== Early life ==
Katie Kehm was born in Warsaw, Illinois, and received her education in public schools. She became a freethinker at the age of 16. In 1885, aged 17, she graduated from high school in Ottumwa, Iowa, and began to work as a teacher, which she continued in Iowa and Oregon for over six years.

Kehm delivered her first freethought lecture while still a teenager. By the time of her high school graduation, Kehm was already well known among freethinkers as a public speaker, secretary of her local Liberal Society, and a contributor to The Truth Seeker.

Samuel Porter Putnam wrote that "although a teacher, and often opposed and ostracized by Bible bigots, she never neglected an opportunity to expose the myths and evil effects of Christianity." Having spent time among working people, Putnam wrote, Kehm "early resolved to do what she could to take people's eyes off their "souls" and turn their attention to their bodies." She traveled widely lecturing on freethought topics.

Samuel Porter Putnam described Kehm Smith as being "gentle in manner and speech; she is an orator, and charms while she hits hard with polished reason and facts told politely."

== First Secular Church of Portland ==
In 1891, Kehm married Hon. D. W. Smith, of Port Townsend, Washington, and the couple were active in the freethought movement together. In particular, they urged the creation of secular churches and secular Sunday schools.

In 1893, Kehm Smith initiated the First Secular Church of Portland, at which she lectured every Sunday. Shortly afterwards, she started the Portland Secular Sunday-school, whose lessons she prepared each week. Within its first year, the Secular Church had between 300 and 400 members. For most of its existence, the church met at Labor Council Hall at First and Stark.

Kehm also acted as secretary to The Oregon State Secular Union.

== Death and legacy ==
Katie Kehm Smith died from typhoid on 18 September 1895, in John Day, Oregon. Her funeral service, led by C.N. Wagner, was strictly secular.

The Annual Congress of the Freethought Federation of America and Secular Union, which took place in New York City 25–27 October 1895, passed a resolution stating:

That that the members of this association have learned with deep sorrow of the untimely death of that most earnest and useful worker In the cause, Katie Kehm Smith, of Oregon; we realize that she did a work never before successfully attempted; that she was a pioneer in Secular Sunday-school labors and that it will be most difficult to find those who are by temperament and natural aptitude adapted to continue and extend the system of Secular Sunday instruction with which her name will remain associated as originator and organizer... In the death of Katie Kehm Smith, Freethought loses one of its bravest and clearest thinkers, and one of its brightest women.

Following her death, Kehm Smith's supporters launched a monument fund, later unveiling a marble obelisk inscribed with "The world is my country. To do good is my religion."
