= Marshall Gauvin =

Canadian Atheist author

Marshall Jerome Gauvin (April 3, 1881 – September 23, 1978), best known as Marshall J. Gauvin was a Canadian atheist author and speaker in the freethought movement.

Gauvin was born near Moncton, New Brunswick. He was a contributor to the Truth Seeker, a publication devoted to freethought. His collected writings are part of the collection of the University of Manitoba.

== Selected publications ==
- The Gauvin-Olson Debates on God and the Bible (1921)
- Did Jesus Christ Really Live? (1922)
- The Illustrated Story of Evolution (1921)
- The Fundamentals of Freethought (Peter Eckler Publishing Company, 1922)
- The Struggle Between Religion and Science (1923)
- Hell: A Christian Doctrine (Truth Seeker Company, 1953) [with Woolsey Teller and Herbert Cutner]
