= Semantha Fairbanks =

- Born: June 16, 1804
- Died: March 20, 1852 (aged 47)

Semantha Fairbanks (June 16, 1804 – March 20, 1852) was a Shaker eldress and artist.

Semantha Fairbanks was born on June 16, 1804. She, along with her widowed mother and five siblings, joined the Mount Lebanon Shaker community in 1813. She became a deaconess in 1840 and was later appointed Second Eldress of the Central Ministry.

During the Era of Manifestations, Fairbanks participated in a number of activities that were thought to manifestations of the spirit world. In 1843, she and Mary Wicks created a series of "sacred sheets", Shaker gift drawings made in pen and ink. Some of those drawings were covered in a kind of sacred writing that has been described as "visual glossolalia." She received spirit visions, including some from identifiable deceased people such as Mother Ann Lee. One of these visions resulted in the expulsion of another Shaker, Olive Gates.

Semantha Fairbanks died on 20 March 1852.

== Gallery ==
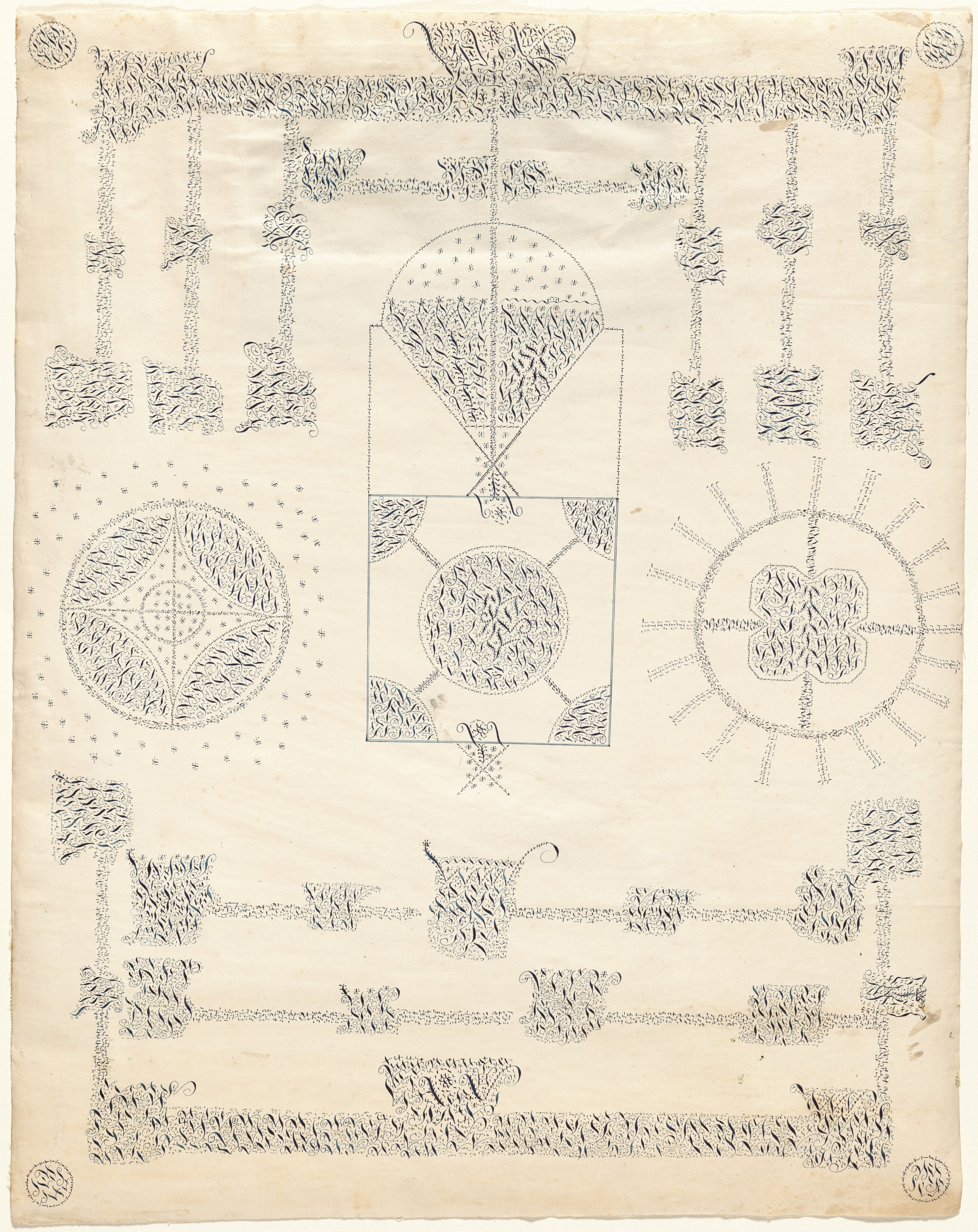
A sacred sheet sent from holy mother wisdom by her angel of many signs

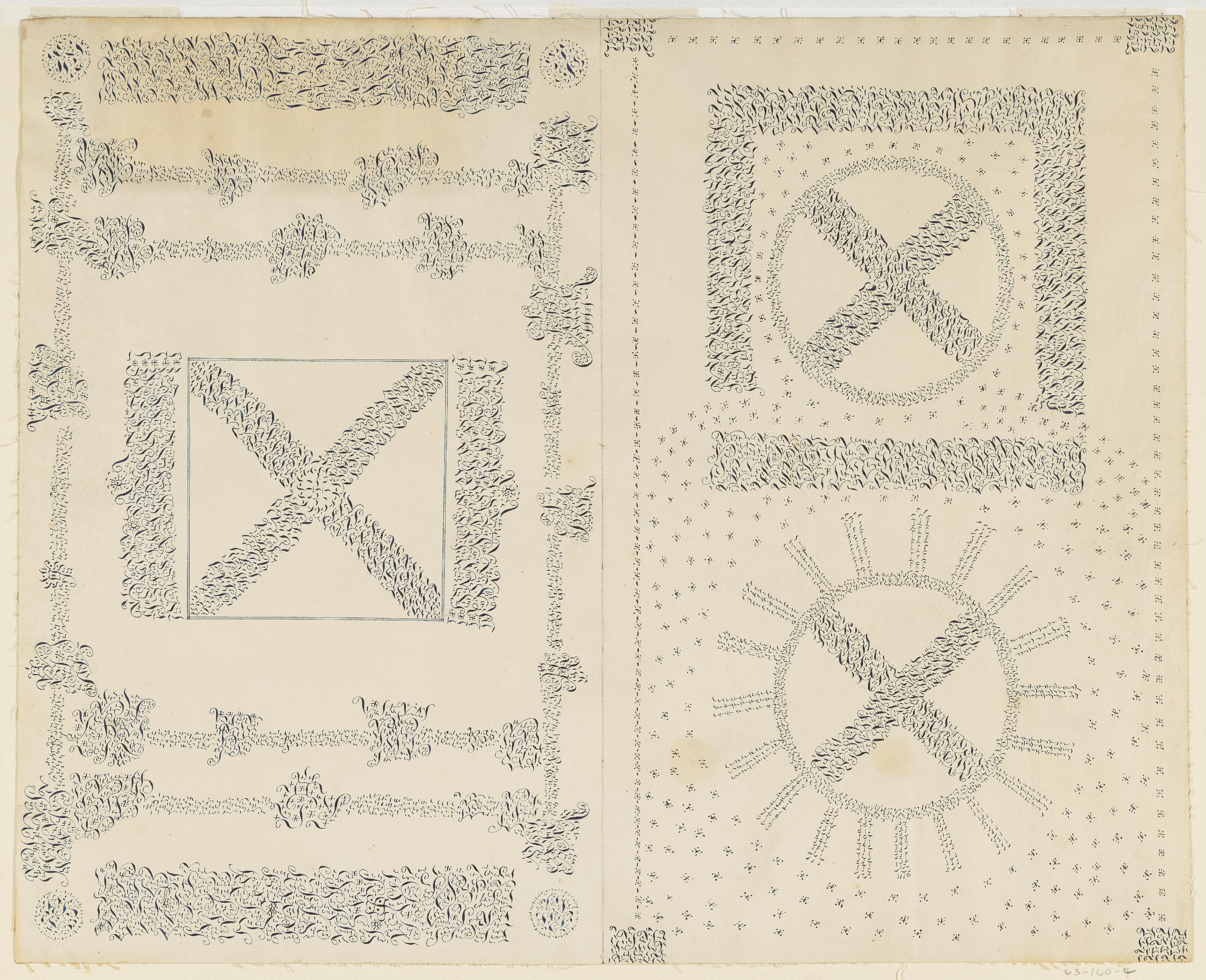
