= George Alfred Gauvin =

Canadian photographer (1863–1933)

George A. Gauvin
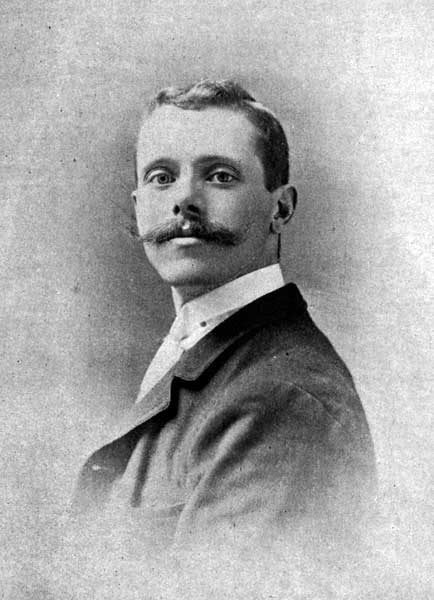
- Born: George Alfred Gauvin; 8 August 1863; Burlington, Vermont, United States
- Died: 18 July 1933 (aged 69); Halifax, Nova Scotia, Canada
- Resting place: Mount Olivet Cemetery
- Other name: G.A. Gauvin
- Occupation: Photographer
- Known for: Photography

George Alfred Gauvin (8 August 1863 – 18 July 1933) was an American-born Canadian photographer and co-founder of Gauvin & Gentzel.

== Early life and education ==
George Alfred Gauvin was born of French descent in Burlington, Vermont, United States, on 8 August 1863. His father, Léon (or George) Gauvin, and his mother, Rose Gilbert, were both from Quebec.

In Underhill, Vermont, he studied at Green Mountain Academy.

== Career ==
After two years of teaching, he and his brother established a photographic studio in Burlington. He later pursued photography studies in Boston before relocating to Halifax, Nova Scotia, in the early 1890s to join Kellie & Company. Following a year at Kellie & Co., he took ownership of the business and entered into a partnership with Adolphe E. Gentzel. By the mid-1890s, they established the Elite Studio in Halifax under their commercial photographic company, Gauvin & Gentzel.

G.A. Gauvin was a founding member of the Halifax Camera Club, serving as one of its vice presidents in 1896.

He attended the annual photographers' convention held by the Photographers Association of America in Jamestown, New York, between 11 and 16 July 1898. Gauvin also attended the second annual convention of the Photographers' Association of New England, which took place in Boston at Grundmann Studios in late July.

Gauvin was elected in 1907 as a delegate for the Maritime provinces at the 10th Annual Convention of the Photographers' Association of New England in Boston. On 2 October 1908, G.A. Gauvin photographed the ceremonial laying of the cornerstone for the Memorial Tower at Sir Sandford Fleming Park. The group photos included Sir Sandford Fleming and Lieutenant-Governor of Nova Scotia Duncan Cameron Fraser, among others.

The photographer remained in Halifax in 1905 as his partner, Adolphe Gentzel, launched a branch of the company in Winnipeg. The Halifax studio, later run by Gauvin's son, remained active until at least 1944.

== Personal life ==
He married Margaret C. Gough, a Halifax native of Irish descent, on 4 October 1892, and they had three children. His first son was named George Alfred Gauvin Jr. G.A. Gauvin resided at 263 Tower Road in Halifax for four decades.

== Death ==
George Alfred Gauvin died at 89 years old on 18 July 1933 in Halifax, Nova Scotia, Canada. He was buried in the Mount Olivet Cemetery on 20 July 1933.

== Works ==
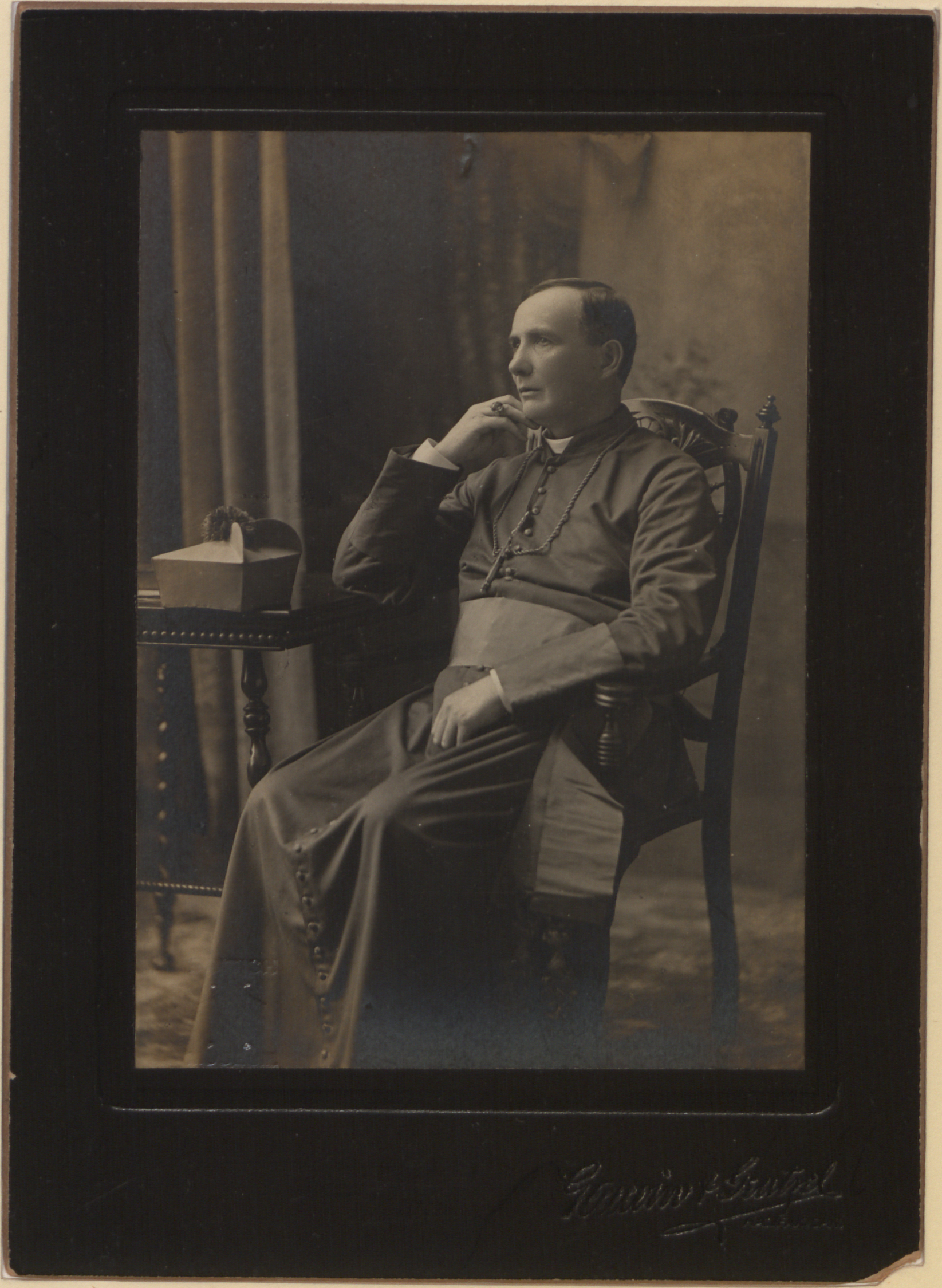
Archbishop Cornelius O'Brien of Halifax

== See also ==
- Gauvin & Gentzel
