= James Hervey Johnson =

American publisher (1901–1988)

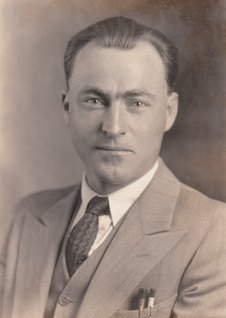
James Hervey Johnson (1901-1988) portrait

James Hervey Johnson (August 2, 1901 – August 6, 1988) was an American atheist freethinker, writer and editor of The Truth Seeker (founded 1873), formerly run by Charles Lee Smith.

== Early years ==
Born in Oregon, his family moved to San Diego in his youth. He attended the San Diego Army-Navy Academy. His father was in the real estate business, and he became a partner. By age 30 he was a self-made millionaire. In the 1930s Johnson was elected county tax assessor, but lost reelection when he advocated the taxation of churches.

== Freethought leader ==
After becoming a freethinker early in life, Johnson became prominent in the San Diego area Freethought movement, eventually hosting annual dinners in honor of his heroes Robert Green Ingersoll and Thomas Paine. He was also a fan of ex-Roman Catholic priest Freethought and Rationalist writer Joseph McCabe, and stocked his large collection of Little Blue Books from Girard, Kansas.

== The Truth Seeker ==
After contributing to the periodical The Truth Seeker for decades, Johnson helped Smith relocate from New York City in 1964, then took over the ailing magazine after Smith's October 26, 1964 death, systematically driving its circulation further down through sloppy editing and shabby publication practices, mainly using it to promote and sell a warehouse of books printed in past decades. Although very wealthy, his entire operation put up the appearance of near-bankruptcy, mainly because he was a tightwad and misanthrope, according to journalist Mimi Swartz, and would never trust anybody else to manage his magazine, and only trusted a few people other than himself to write articles for it.

== White supremacist, Antisemitic, and Anti-Zionist views ==
As with Smith and Smith's cousin Woolsey Teller, Johnson was a white supremacist, and was also antisemitic and anti-Zionist, always referring to Israel as "the bandit state of Israel".

== AAAA vs. American Atheists and Madalyn Murray O'Hair ==
Johnson also took over the American Association for the Advancement of Atheism (AAAA) from Smith, but his continued promotion of white supremacy caused its membership to stay low during the heyday of the American civil rights movement in the 1960s and 1970s, permitting his archrival Madalyn Murray O'Hair (who gained fame in 1963 with the U.S. Supreme Court decision to ban Bible reading in public schools) to build the membership of her organization American Atheists. In 1983 after years of acrimony (he liked to call her a foul-mouthed immoral disgrace to the movement), and several unsuccessful attempts to get money from him, she angrily wrote him “You are a dying, defunct, discredited old man who will grow moldy in an unmarked grave.”

== Natural health and other views ==
Johnson was also a Naturopathy advocate, which he called "Natural Hygiene", touting the health value of raw milk, vegetarianism, etc., denying the Germ theory of disease, and selling books on the subject, considering all medical doctors quacks and refusing to seek medical help for a large tumor on his face that developed in the 1960s. Fluent in Spanish, he loved to take long walks into Mexico, and usually employed Spanish-speaking help. He held paranoid views about Jews, blacks, and lawyers, and his ignorance about Jews was often demonstrated in his writings, and off-the-record comments, such as that Kosher food is unhealthy.

== Murder and arson attempts and automobile accident ==
Once in the late 1960s or early 1970s an African-American man came to the company headquarters in downtown San Diego, California (which had a large and growing minority and African-American population) with a Molotov cocktail to burn him out for his hate literature, but went in and repented and apologized. On October 3, 1981, however, somebody else set fire to it while he was sleeping there, burning it to the ground and destroying the large library left by Smith. It was while crossing the street in front of the ruins of his headquarters to his rented apartment on October 14, 1981, that he was run over, after which he spent several weeks in a Roman Catholic hospital while his property was looted. He eventually received a $50K settlement from the automobile insurance company.

== Later years ==
After the accident, he never fully recovered his health, and on the advice of friends dropped the white supremacist and antisemitic articles, concentrating on Atheism and Freethought, including a campaign against male circumcision. In 1984 after circulation dropped to 300, he ceased his publication of The Truth Seeker.

== Death and war over his estate ==
On August 6, 1988, while trying to soak away his many pains, Johnson died of a heart attack in his bathtub in his apartment in downtown San Diego of massive atherosclerosis, leaving a $14 million estate, with instructions to hold no funeral service, and establish the James Hervey Johnson Charitable Educational Trust, to "expose religion as against reason and to publicize my views on religion and health." He died after Madalyn Murray O'Hair staged a coup at a sham stockholders meeting in 1987 and began an unsuccessful court battle to claim it, even though he detested her and her claim was found legally groundless because his estate was based on his own personal wealth and investments, not profits from the company, which operated at a loss. In 1988 he countersued her for $7 million, accusing her of racketeering, but died before it could be resolved. In 1994 the trial ended in favor of O'Hair, but she feared a reversal on appeal, and began secreting assets before her tragic 1995 murder. After a nasty fight, Johnson's estate went to his personal friend Bonnie Lange, who continued publication of the Truth Seeker, promptly dropping his white supremacist and antisemitic programs; however, printed publication became sporadic after 1997.

== Quotes ==
- "To Theists, the Universe proves the existence of God. To Atheists, the only thing the Universe proves is the Universe."
- "Man is a product of nature, a part of the Universe. The Universe is operated under exact natural laws. Man is a product of millions of years of evolution. He adapts himself to the laws of nature or he perishes."
- "Intelligent men do not decide any subject until they have carefully examined both or all sides of it. Fools, cowards, and those too lazy to think, accept blindly, without examination, dogmas and doctrines imposed upon them in childhood by their parents, priests, and teachers, when their minds were immature and they could not reason."

== Publications ==
- Superior Men (1949)
- There Is No God (1952)
- Religion is a Gigantic Fraud
- Successful Stock Investing (2nd Ed., 1984)
