= Samuel Porter Putnam =

American journalist

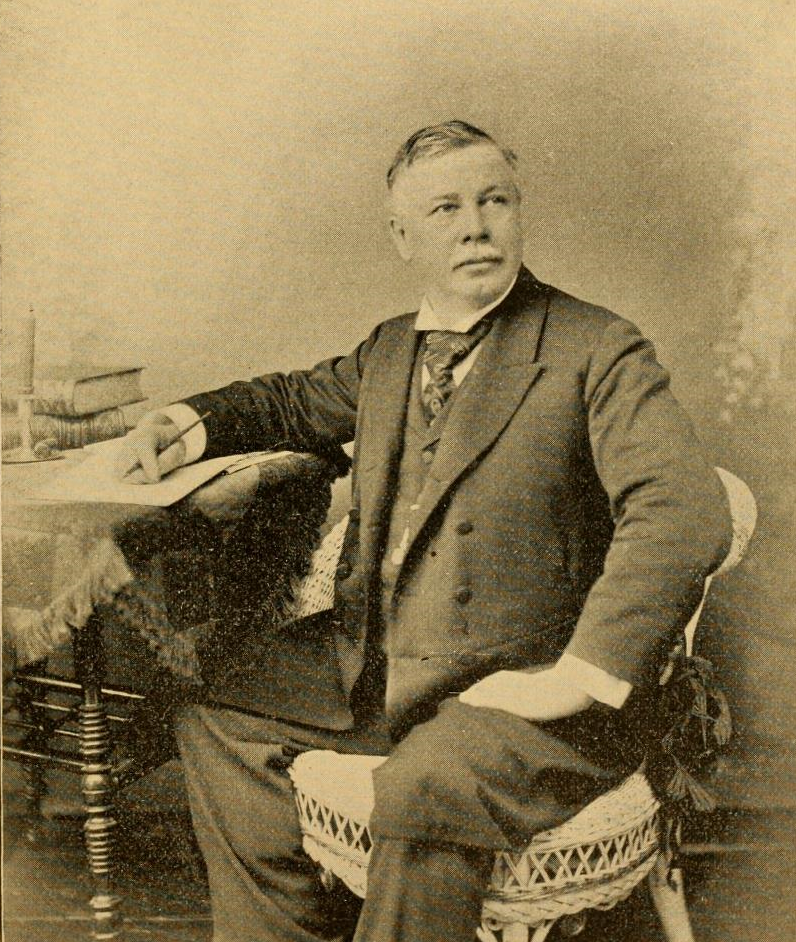
- Born: July 23, 1838; Chichester, New Hampshire
- Died: December 11, 1896 (aged 58); Boston
- Occupations: Critic, Freethought writer

Samuel Porter Putnam (July 23, 1838 - December 11, 1896) was an American freethinker, critic and publicist.

== Biography ==
Putnam was born in Chichester, New Hampshire. His father was a minister of a Congregational church. He graduated from Dartmouth College in 1861, then entered the Union Army as a private, and was promoted during the war to a captaincy. In 1865 he entered the theological seminary in Chicago, where he graduated in 1868, and preached for three years thereafter as a Congregational minister in the pulpits of Illinois. In 1871 he became a Unitarian minister, and preached for several years in various states.

He then renounced the Christianity and became an avowed freethinker. He attacked the Bible and Christianity upon the platform, and for 20 years probably making more speeches against them than any other American, speaking almost every day for months together. Putnam was married to Louise Howell for eighteen years, they divorced in 1885 due to religious differences. They had two children.

In 1888 with George E. MacDonald he founded the Freethought journal in San Francisco. It dissolved in 1891. He formed the Freethought Federation of America as president in 1892. It merged with the American Secular Union and became the American Secular Union and Freethought Federation in 1895.

Historian Leigh Eric Schmidt discusses Putnam's life in Village Atheists: How America's Unbelievers Made Their Way In a Godly Nation (2016).

== Death ==
Putnam died from a gas leakage on December 11, 1896. His body was found on the floor with twenty year old lecturer May Collins in her hotel room in Boston. They had planned to go to the theatre together but were "poisoned by illuminating gas."

== Publications ==
- Prometheus: A Poem (1877)
- Gottlieb: His Life
- Golden Throne
- Why Don't He Lend a Hand? (1880)
- Ingersoll and Jesus (1882)
- Waifs and Wanderings: A Novel (1884)
- Adami and Heva: A New Version (1886)
- The New God (1887)
- The Problem of the Universe
- My Religious Experience (1890)
- Pen Pictures of the World's Fair
- Four Hundred Years of Freethought (New York: Truth Seeker Company, 1894)
