= Kathleen Smith =

Kathleen Smith may refer to:

- Kathleen Smith (archer) British paralympian
- Kathleen Smith (cricketer) (1927–1998), English cricketer
- Kath Smith (1915–1993), Australian cricketer
- Clara Kathleen Smith, poet from New Brunswick, Canada

== See also ==
- Kathy Smith (disambiguation)
- Katie Smith (disambiguation)
