= Katy Simpson Smith =

American novelist

- Born: Jackson, Mississippi, U.S.
- Education: Mount Holyoke College (BA); University of North Carolina at Chapel Hill (PhD); Bennington College (MFA)
- Occupations: Novelist, professor
- Writing career
- Notable awards: Richard Wright Award for Literary Excellence
- Website: katysimpsonsmith.com

Katy Simpson Smith is an American novelist based in New Orleans. As of 2023 she is a member of the core faculty at the Bennington College Writing Seminars.

== Early life and education ==
Katy Simpson Smith was born and grew up in Jackson, Mississippi, U.S.

She attended public schools in her hometown of Jackson, Mississippi, before earning a B.A. in History and Film Studies from Mt. Holyoke College in Massachusetts. After receiving a Ph.D. in History from the University of North Carolina, Chapel Hill, she went to Bennington College Writing Seminars for her M.F.A. in Creative Writing.

== Literary career ==
Her first book, We Have Raised All of You: Motherhood in the South, 1750-1835, a cross-cultural study of motherhood among Southern whites, Indians, and African-Americans in Virginia and the Carolinas, was published in 2013 by Louisiana State University Press. According to the Journal of American History, "Smith has made a valuable contribution to gender and southern studies by effectively complicating and humanizing the concept of motherhood. ... Her text will join the ranks of the few others that tackle this universal and timeless subject."

Smith's first novel, The Story of Land and Sea (HarperCollins, 2014) is set in Beaufort, North Carolina, at the end of the American Revolution. The New York Times wrote that "Smith's spare, rhythmic prose captivates," and according to The Philadelphia Inquirer, "Smith has written something wondrous and rare in her coruscating debut novel…In quiet, powerful language, The Story of Land and Sea takes us to a South that has been forgotten, blotted out by the stain of war, and breathes life into early history." BBC listed it among the "10 Best New Books to Read," and Huffington Post and Vogue Magazine included it as one of their "Best Books of the Year."

The Library Journal wrote about her second novel, Free Men (HarperCollins, 2016), "If [The Story of Land and Sea] could be described as a beautiful murmur, this book is a shout, sharply written and more urgent." In his review in The Washington Post, Ron Charles observed, "With this collage of experiences twisted together and soaked in blood, Smith cuts to the bone of our national character."

Her third novel, The Everlasting, is set in Rome across several time periods. It switches among the perspectives of several characters, including the Medici princess Giulia and the early christian martyr Saint Prisca. The Everlasting was included by The New York Times in its list of the ten best historical fiction of 2020.

The Weeds, appearing April 18, 2023, was published by FSG. The starred review in Kirkus calls it "Luminous . . . A lyrical meditation on power, need, and love."

The Maltese Version was described in the New York Times as "philosopical and disarmingly dishy" and as "a book that — for both its inventiveness and its many linguistic sleights of hand — can renew our faith in the playful joys and critical capacity of fiction." The Wall Street Journal called it "Sensual, linguistically playful": "A deep love of language pulses through Ms. Smith’s novel ... Ms. Smith offers her own translation of the strange and specific vocabulary of heartache."

Smith's writing has also appeared in The Paris Review, Los Angeles Review of Books, The Oxford American, Granta, Literary Hub, Garden & Gun, and Lenny.

== Recognition and awards ==
She has received fellowships and residencies at the MacDowell Colony (2019), the Dora Maar House in Ménerbes (2021), the Santa Maddalena Foundation in Tuscany, Italy (2022), the Monastery of St. Gertrude in Idaho (2022), and the Harvard Radcliffe Institute (2025-2026). She received the Richard Wright Award for Literary Excellence (2023).

== Academia ==
Smith is a member of the core faculty at the Bennington Writing Seminars.

== Bibliography ==
=== Novels ===
- The Story of Land and Sea, Harper Collins, 2014
- Free Men, Harper Collins, 2016
- The Everlasting, Harper Collins, 2020
- The Weeds, Farrar, Straus and Giroux, 2023
- The Maltese Version, Farrar, Straus and Giroux, 2026

=== Non-fiction ===
- We Have Raised All of You: Motherhood in the South, 1750-1835, LSU Press, 2013
