= Kay Smith =

Kay Smith may refer to:

- Kay Nolte Smith (1932–1993), American writer
- Kay Smith (artist) (1923–2025), artist from Illinois
- Clara Kathleen Smith (1911–2004), Canadian poet from New Brunswick
- Kay Zinck (née Smith; 1961–2022), Canadian curler
