= Katharine Smyth =

American memoirist

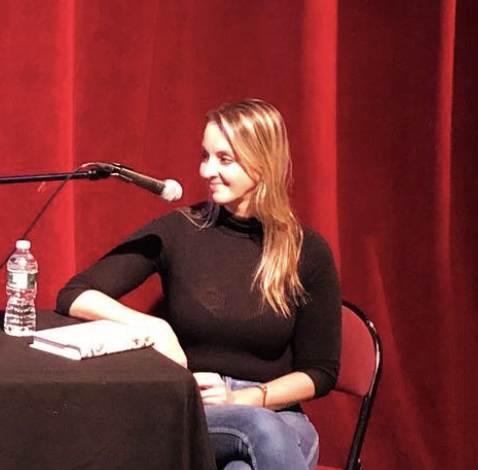
- Katharine Smyth at the 2019 Brattleboro Literary Festival
- Born: July 14, 1981 (age 45); Newton, Massachusetts
- Occupation: Author

Katharine Smyth is an American author, best known for All the Lives We Ever Lived: Seeking Solace in Virginia Woolf, a memoir about her father's life and death that incorporates literary criticism of Virginia Woolf's 1927 novel To the Lighthouse. Her essays and articles have appeared in The New York Times, The Paris Review, The Atlantic, Vogue, and The Point. Her essay “Prey” was selected as a Notable Essay in The Best American Essays 2014. Smyth lives in Bozeman, Montana.

== Early life and education ==
Smyth, who grew up in Boston, attended high school at Phillips Academy and graduated from Brown University in 2003. She also studied abroad at Oxford, and later earned an MFA in nonfiction from Columbia University, where she was awarded a Dean’s Fellowship, the school’s highest merit-based award.

Her father, Geoffrey Smyth, was an English architect and a co-founder of the architecture magazine Clip-Kit. He was diagnosed with kidney cancer when Katharine was a child, and he died at the age of 59.

== Career ==
Smyth's memoir, All the Lives We Ever Lived: Seeking Solace in Virginia Woolf, was released in 2019 to widely positive reviews, including from The New York Times Book Review, The Wall Street Journal, The New Yorker, The Washington Post, The Boston Globe, Vogue, Time, and The Times Literary Supplement.

Smyth's memoir was also given a starred review from Kirkus, and was named a New York Times Book Review Editors’ Choice. Heller McAlpin, writing for The Wall Street Journal, says, “Smyth pulls off a tricky double homage in her beautifully written first book, a deft blend of memoir, biography, and literary criticism that’s a gift to readers drawn to big questions about time, memory, mortality, love and grief.” Charlotte Gordon, writing for The Washington Post, says, “This is a transcendent book, not a simple meditation on one woman’s loss, but a reflection on all of our losses, on loss itself, on how to remember and commemorate our dead.” And in The New York Times Book Review, Radhika Jones writes that Smyth’s “prose is so fluid and clear throughout that it’s not surprising to observe her view of her family, its cracks and fissures, sharpen into unsparing focus… Her book could itself become solace for people navigating their way through the complexities of grief for their fallen idols. And they will be lucky to have it.”
