= Cornelius O'Brien (bishop) =

Canadian bishop and writer (1843–1906)

- Archbishop of Halifax, Nova Scotia
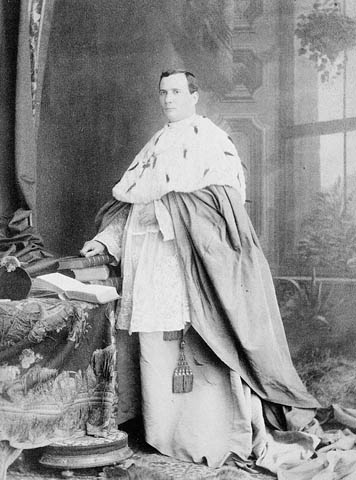
- Province: Nova Scotia
- See: Halifax
- Installed: 1 December 1882
- Term ended: 9 March 1906
- Predecessor: Michael Hannan
- Successor: Edward Joseph McCarthy

Orders
- Ordination: 8 April 1871

Personal details
- Born: 4 May 1843 New Glasgow, Prince Edward Island
- Died: 9 March 1906 (aged 62) Halifax, Nova Scotia
- Denomination: Roman Catholic

Cornelius O'Brien (4 May 1843 – 9 March 1906) was a Canadian Roman Catholic priest, archbishop, and author of 39 books.

== Life ==
Born in New Glasgow, Prince Edward Island, the son of Terence O'Brien and Catherine O'Driscoll, O'Brien graduated from Urban College and in 1871 was ordained a priest. Upon returning to Canada, he was appointed a professor in St. Dunstan's College and rector of the Cathedral of Charlottetown, but failing health in 1874 led to his transfer to the country parish of Indian River, where O'Brien devoted his leisure to writing, publishing The Philosophy of the Bible vindicated (Charlottetown, 1876); Early Stages of Christianity in England (Charlottetown, 1880); and Mater Admirablia (Montreal, 1882).

In 1882, he was appointed Archbishop of Halifax, Nova Scotia. He followed Michael Hannan in this position. He established a Catholic high school (1888) and Holy Heart Seminary (1896), both in Halifax and helped to found the French-language Collège Sainte Anne (1890) in Pointe-de-l'Église, Nova Scotia.

In 1894 he delivered a eulogy for the Rt. Hon. Sir John Thompson, a former Premier of Nova Scotia and the first Catholic Prime Minister of Canada. From 1896 to 1897, he was president of the Royal Society of Canada.

He also wrote St. Agnes, Virgin and Martyr (Halifax, 1887), Aminta, a modern life drama (1890), and Memoirs of Edmund Burke, the first Bishop of Halifax (1894).

He died in Halifax on 9 March 1906. He was buried in the Holy Cross Cemetery, Halifax.

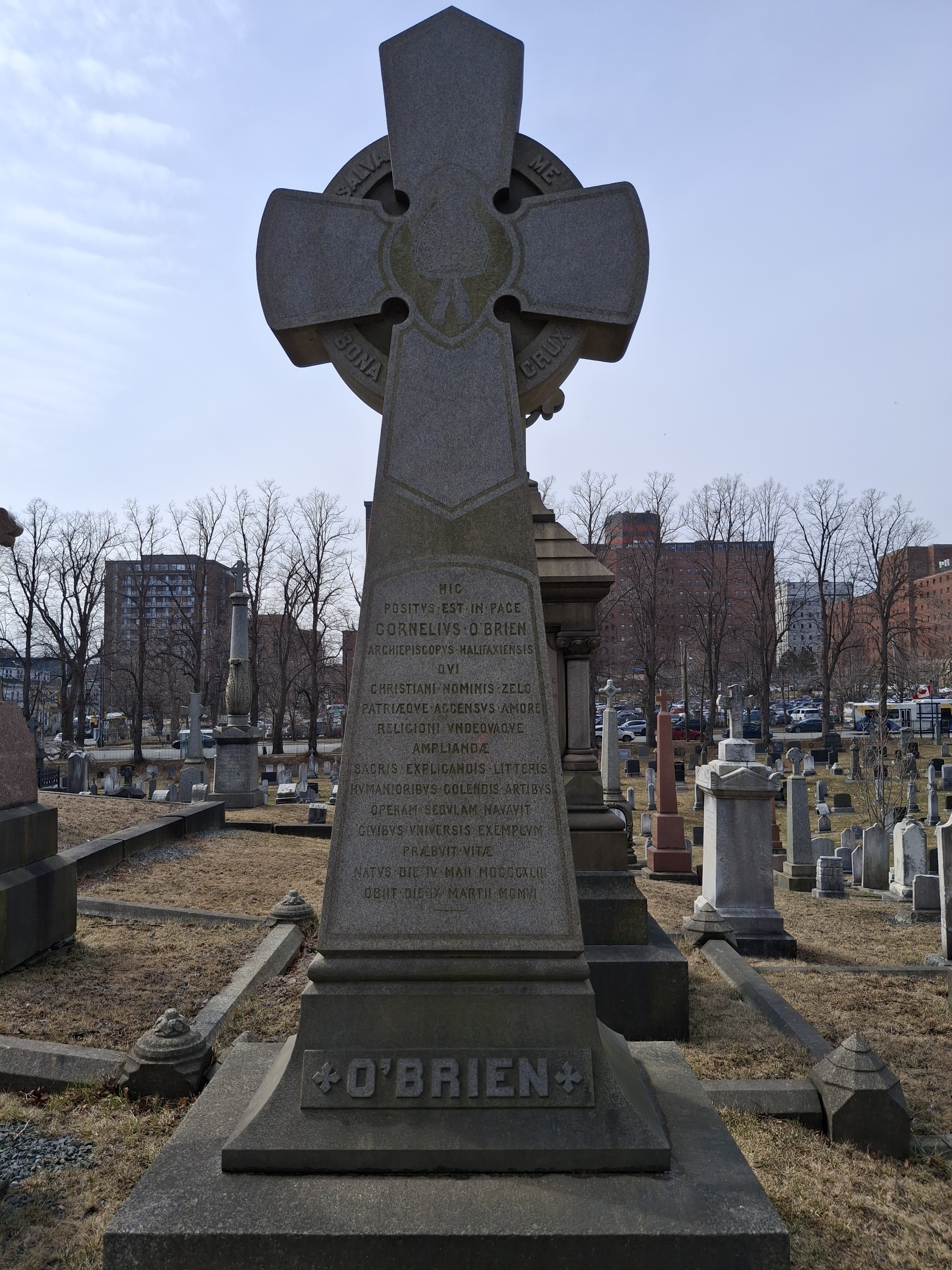
Archbishop O'Brien's grave at Holy Cross Cemetery

== Notes ==
Professional and academic associations
Preceded by Alfred Richard Cecil Selwyn	President of the Royal Society of Canada; 1896–1897	Succeeded by Félix-Gabriel Marchand
