= Kathryn Smith =

Kathryn Smith may refer to:

- Kathryn Smith (American football) (born 1980s), American football coach
- Kathryn Smith (swimmer), English swimmer
- Kate Locke (born 1971), author who uses the nom de plume Kathryn Smith among others
- Kate Smith (Kathryn Elizabeth Smith, 1907–1986), American singer
