= Edward Joseph McCarthy =

- Archbishop of Halifax, Nova Scotia
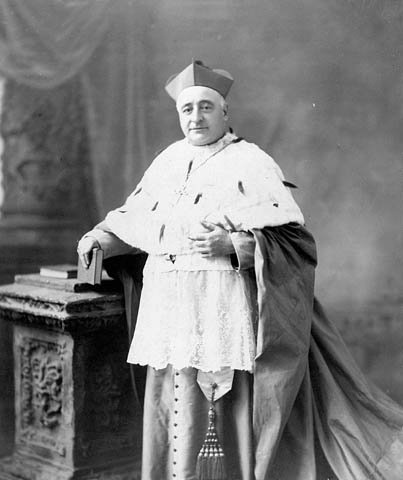
- See: Halifax
- Installed: June 27, 1906
- Term ended: January 26, 1931
- Predecessor: Cornelius O'Brien
- Successor: Thomas O'Donnell

Orders
- Ordination: July 9, 1874

Personal details
- Born: January 25, 1850 Halifax, Nova Scotia
- Died: January 26, 1931 (aged 81)
- Denomination: Roman Catholic

Archbishop Edward Joseph McCarthy (25 January 1850 – 26 January 1931) was a Canadian Roman Catholic priest and archbishop.

McCarthy was in Halifax, Nova Scotia on January 25, 1850. In preparation for the priesthood, he was educated at St. Mary's College and the Grand Seminary of Montreal.

He was ordained on July 9, 1874. In 1906, he was appointed Archbishop of Halifax, Nova Scotia. He followed Cornelius O'Brien in this position. On 14 July 1910, he consecrated St. Patrick's Cathedral in Halifax, and in 1913 became vice-patron of the Catholic Emigration Association of Canada, an organization established to help maintain immigrants' links to Catholicism and to encourage them to settle close to others who spoke the same language as they.
