= The Truth Seeker =

American freethought magazine (1873-)

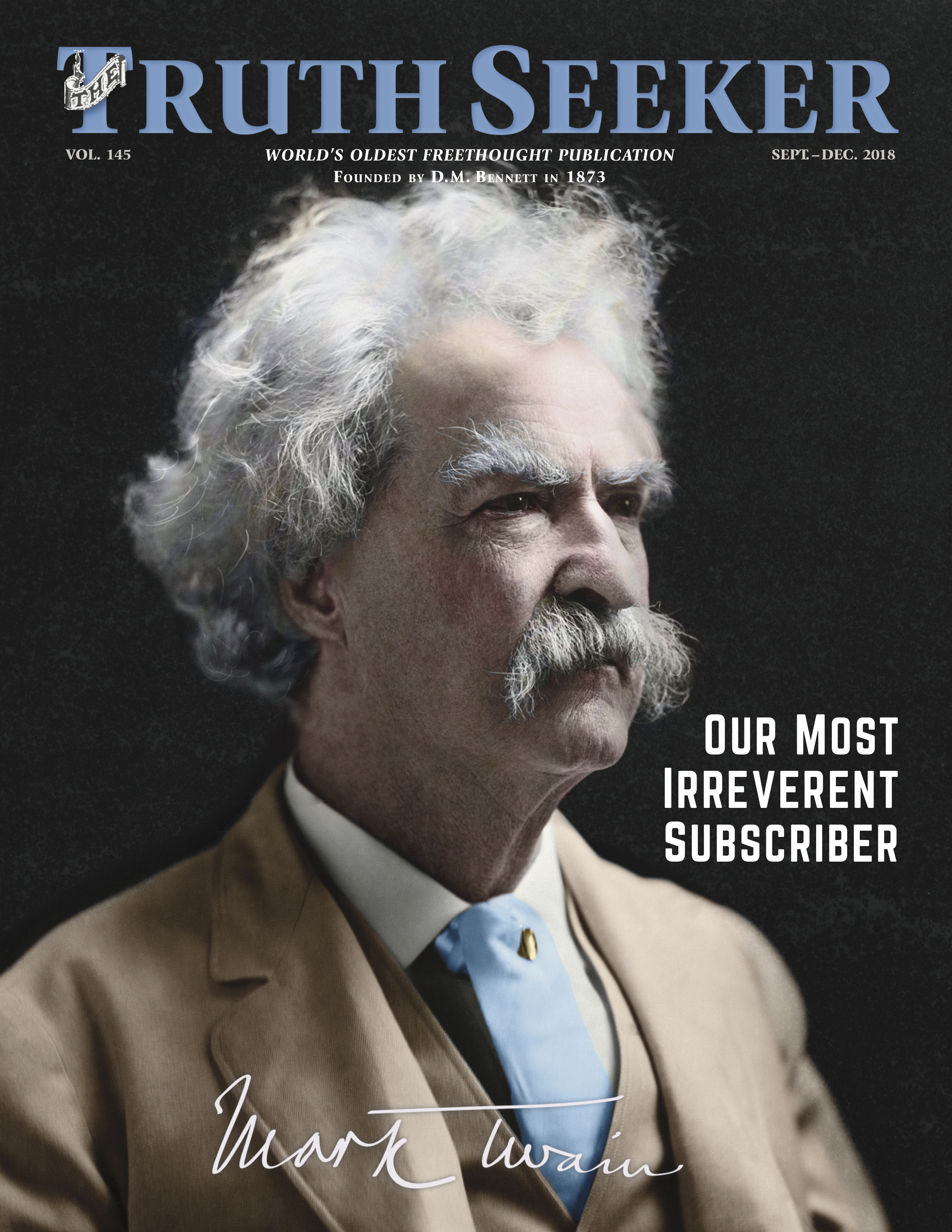
- The Truth Seeker cover dated Sept.–Dec. 2018
- Editor-in-Chief: Roderick Bradford
- Categories: History, secularism, censorship
- Frequency: Triannual
- Publisher: Roderick Bradford / The Truth Seeker Company
- First issue: 1873; 153 years ago
- Based in: San Diego, U.S.
- Website: thetruthseeker.net
- ISSN: 0041-3712

The Truth Seeker is an American periodical published since 1873. It was considered the most influential Freethought publication during the period following the Civil War into the first decades of the 20th century, known as the Golden Age of Freethought. Though there were other influential Freethought periodicals, Truth Seeker was the only one with a national circulation. The headquarters is in San Diego, California. The Truth Seeker is the world's oldest freethought publication, and one of the oldest periodicals in America. Among general-readership titles, only Harper's Magazine, The Atlantic, Scientific American, and The Nation are older.

== Overview ==
In the first issue, on September 1, 1873, editor D. M. Bennett and his wife Mary Wicks Bennett proclaimed that the publication would devote itself to: "science, morals, free thought, free discussions, liberalism, sexual equality, labor reform progression, free education, and whatever tends to elevate and emancipate the human race."

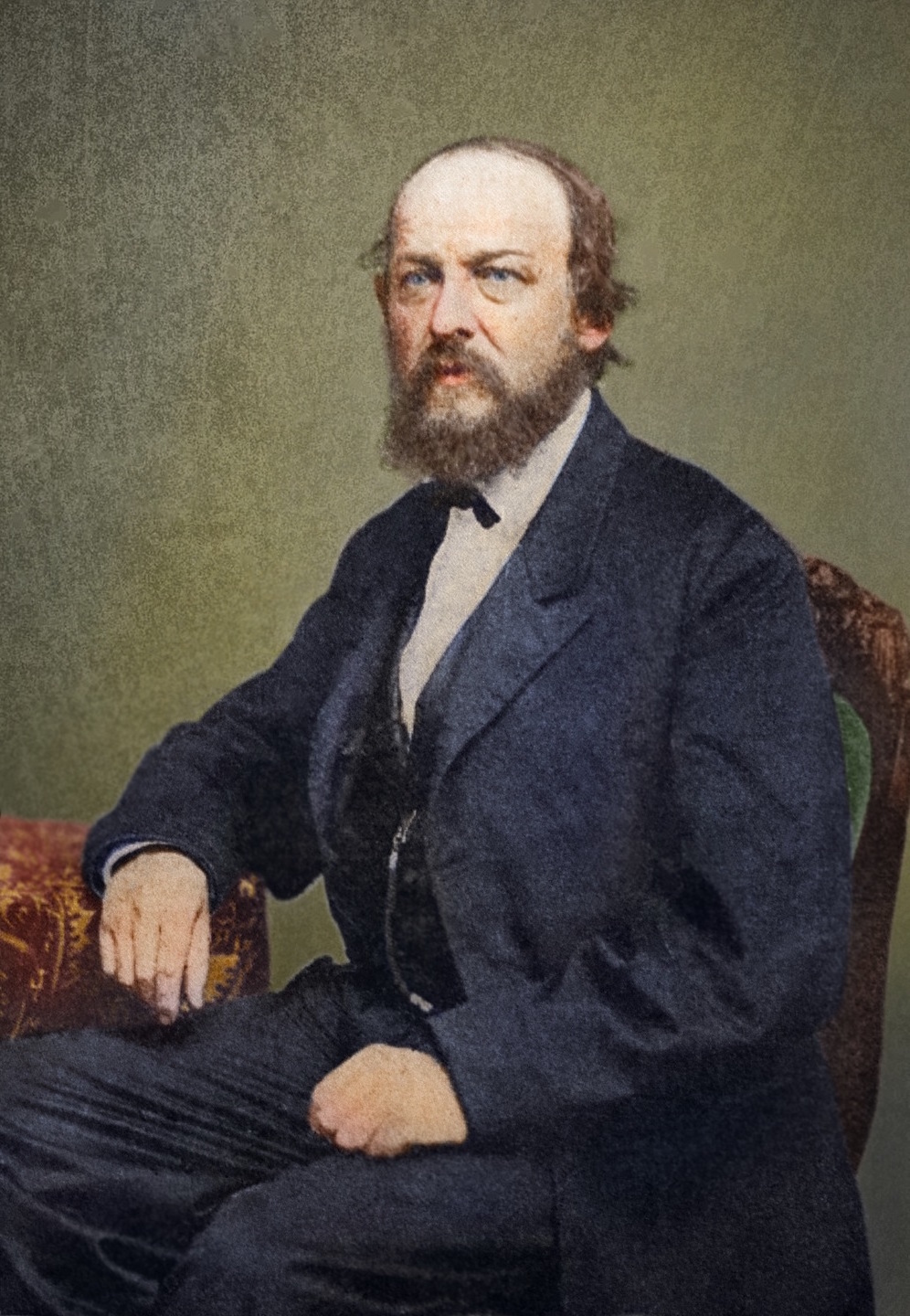
D. M. Bennett, founder of The Truth Seeker

Subsequent editors included Eugene and George E. Macdonald, Charles Lee Smith (along with his associate editors Woolsey Teller and later Robert E. Kuttner), James Hervey Johnson, Bonnie Lange, and Roderick Bradford. For several years, Susan H. Wixon had editorial charge of the children's department.

In 1988, Madalyn Murray O'Hair put out several issues under the masthead during the course of an unsuccessful attempt to take over the company; however, the courts ruled against her ownership.

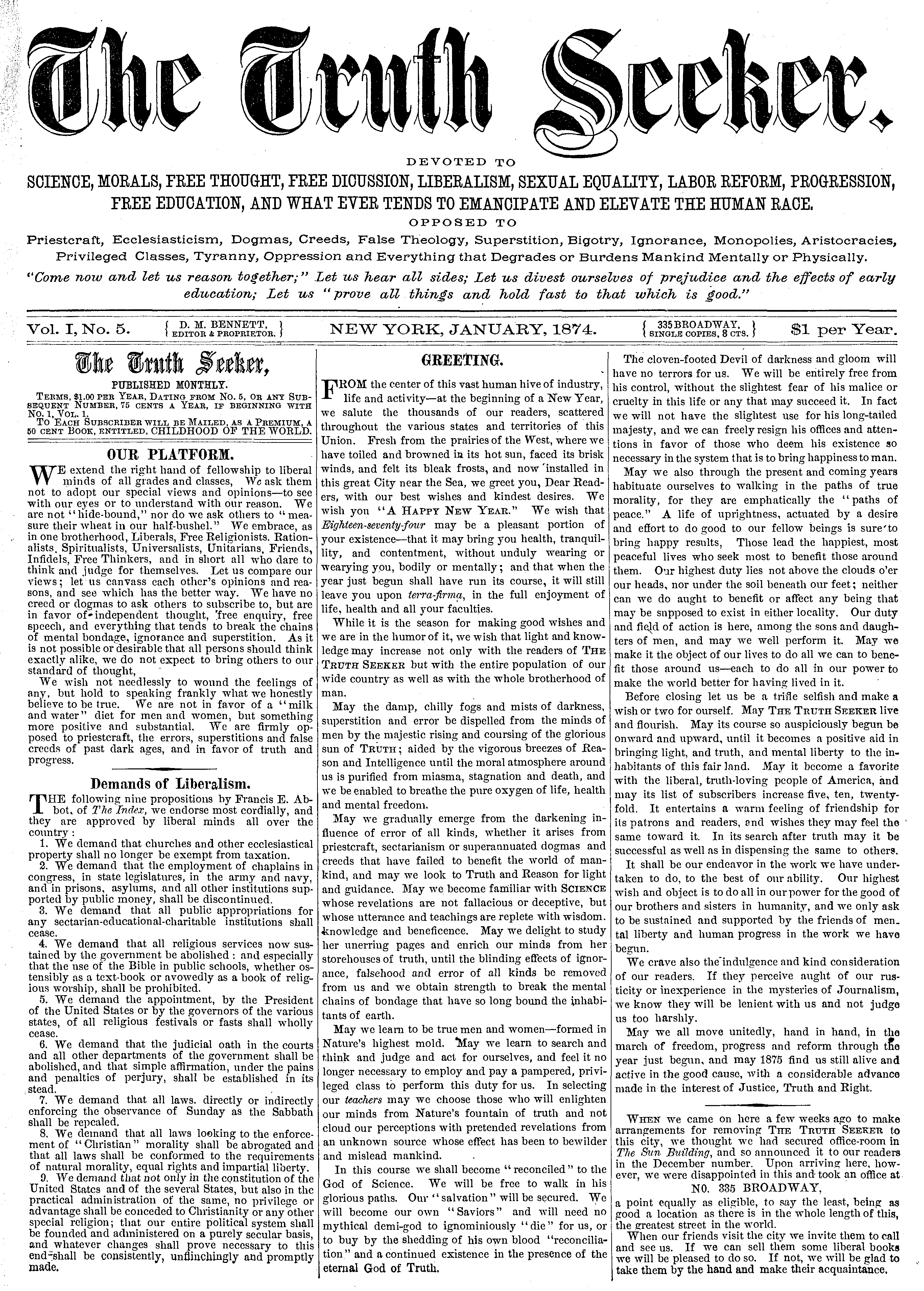
The front page of the Truth Seeker from January 1874. After being founded in Paris, Illinois, in September 1873, D.M. Bennett relocated to New York City where The Truth Seeker remained until 1964 when it was moved to San Diego, CA.

Morris Altman, Mark Twain, Robert G. Ingersoll, Katie Kehm Smith, Elizabeth Cady Stanton, Clarence Darrow, Harry Houdini, Steve Allen, Paul Krassner, and Gay Talese are or have been contributors, subscribers, and supporters of The Truth Seeker.

== Past racism ==
Starting in the 1950s, The Truth Seeker started publishing explicitly racist content. Under the editorship of Charles Lee Smith beginning in 1937, Smith, Woolsey Teller and their successor James Hervey Johnson championed antisemitism, scientific racism and white supremacy. Anthropologist Robert Sussman described The Truth Seeker as a "virulent anti-Semitic publication".

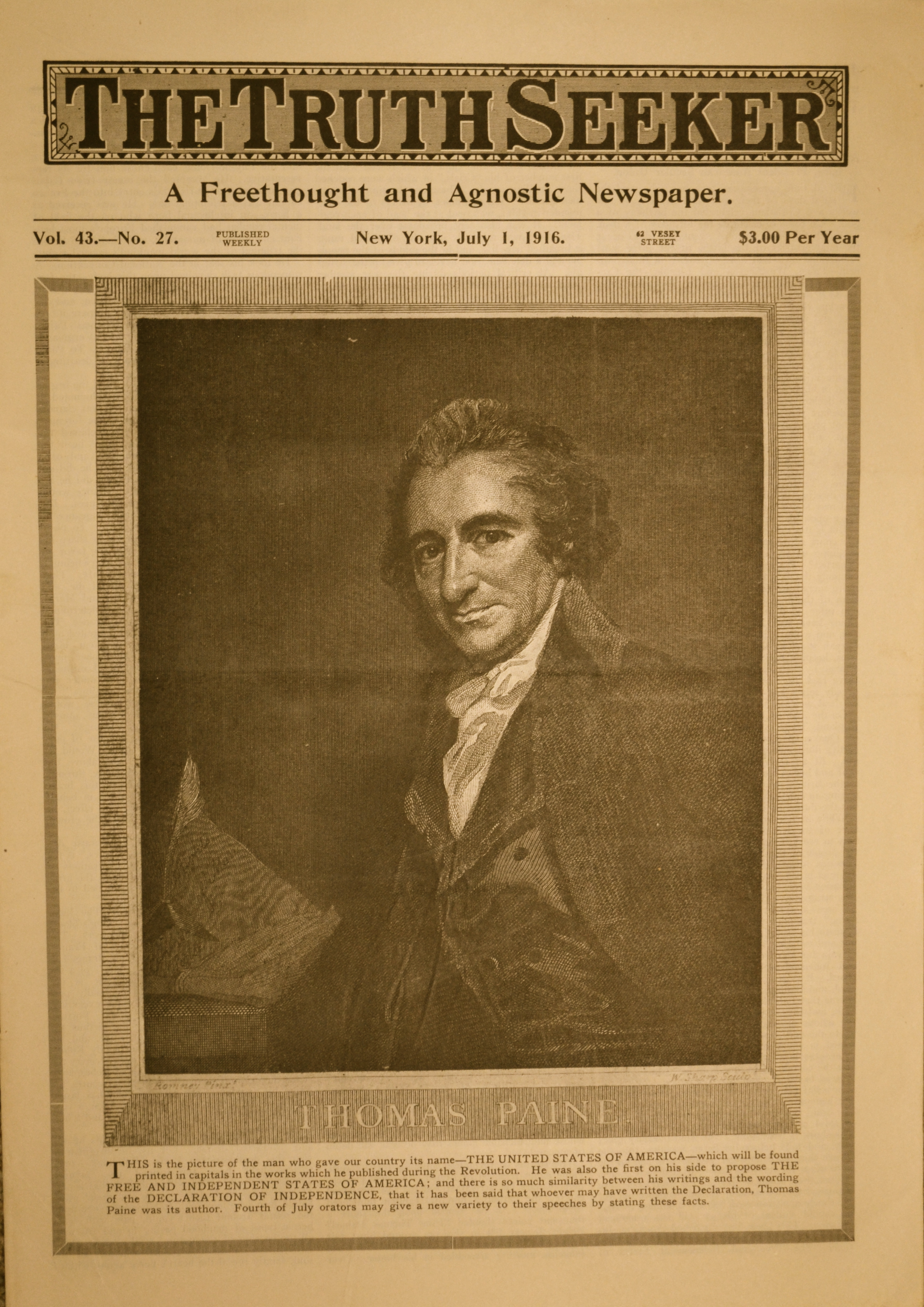
Since its founding in 1873, The Truth Seeker has championed Thomas Paine.

In 1995, authors Mark Fackler and Charles H. Lippy noted:

Under Smith and Johnson, the paper became more conservative and advocated white supremacy along with atheism. While Northern European ethnocentrism had been an implicit theme since the paper's founding, its open racism and xenophobia offended many readers. In recent years its circulation has declined to less than a thousand.

Freethought historian Tom Flynn noted that "1950 to 1988 marked its most troubled period, when the periodical embraced racism, eugenics, and anti-Semitism, but precisely because of that achieved the smallest impact in its history."

After Johnson's death in 1988, Bonnie Lange assumed the role of publisher and editor and the "racism, anti-Semitism, white supremacism, eugenics advocacy, and other marginal interests of the Smith-Teller and Johnson years were conclusively abandoned."

Roderick Bradford, editor/publisher of The Truth Seeker, 2014 to present

== Gallery ==
Covers of the Truth Seeker featuring Thomas Paine

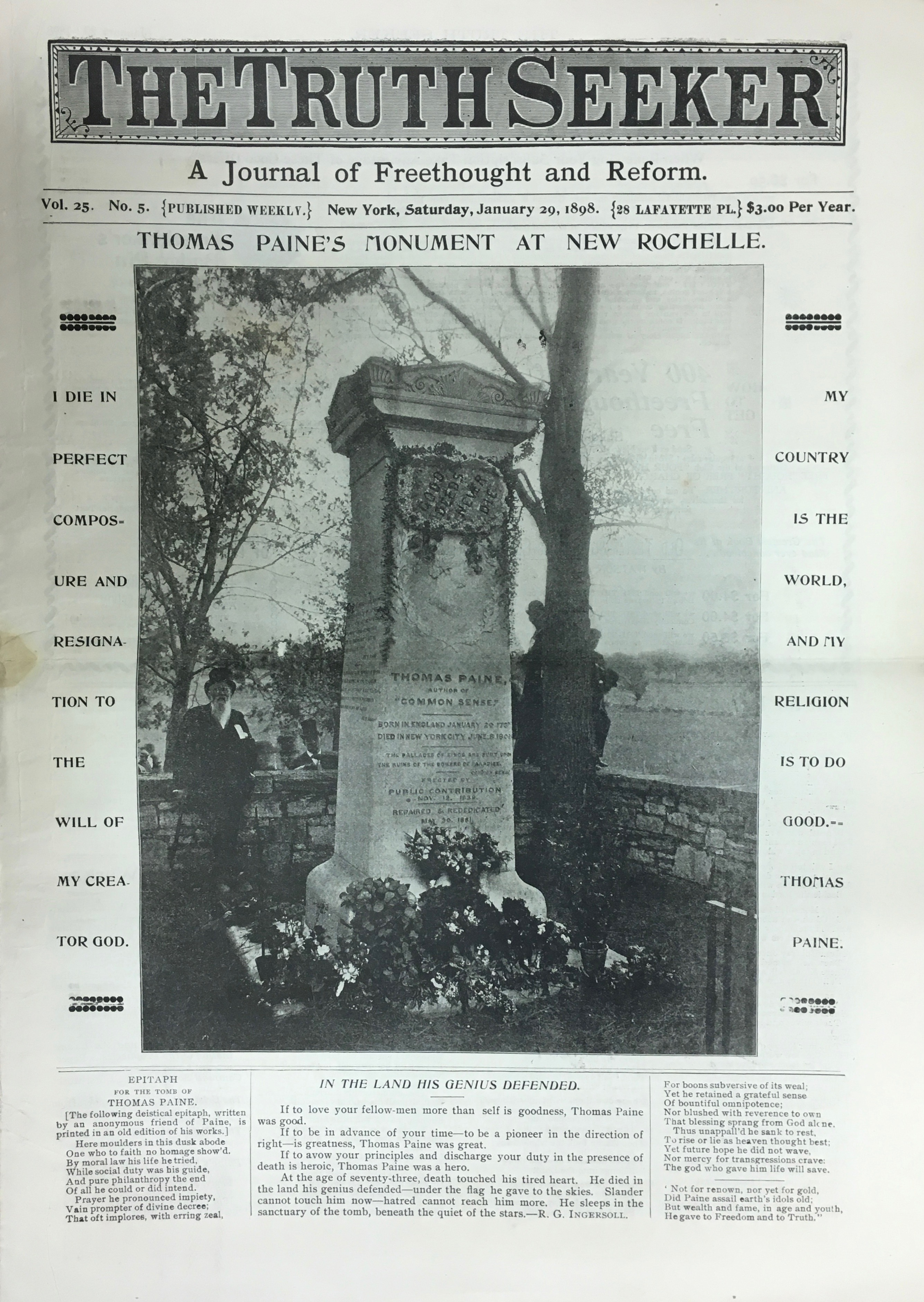
January 29, 1898

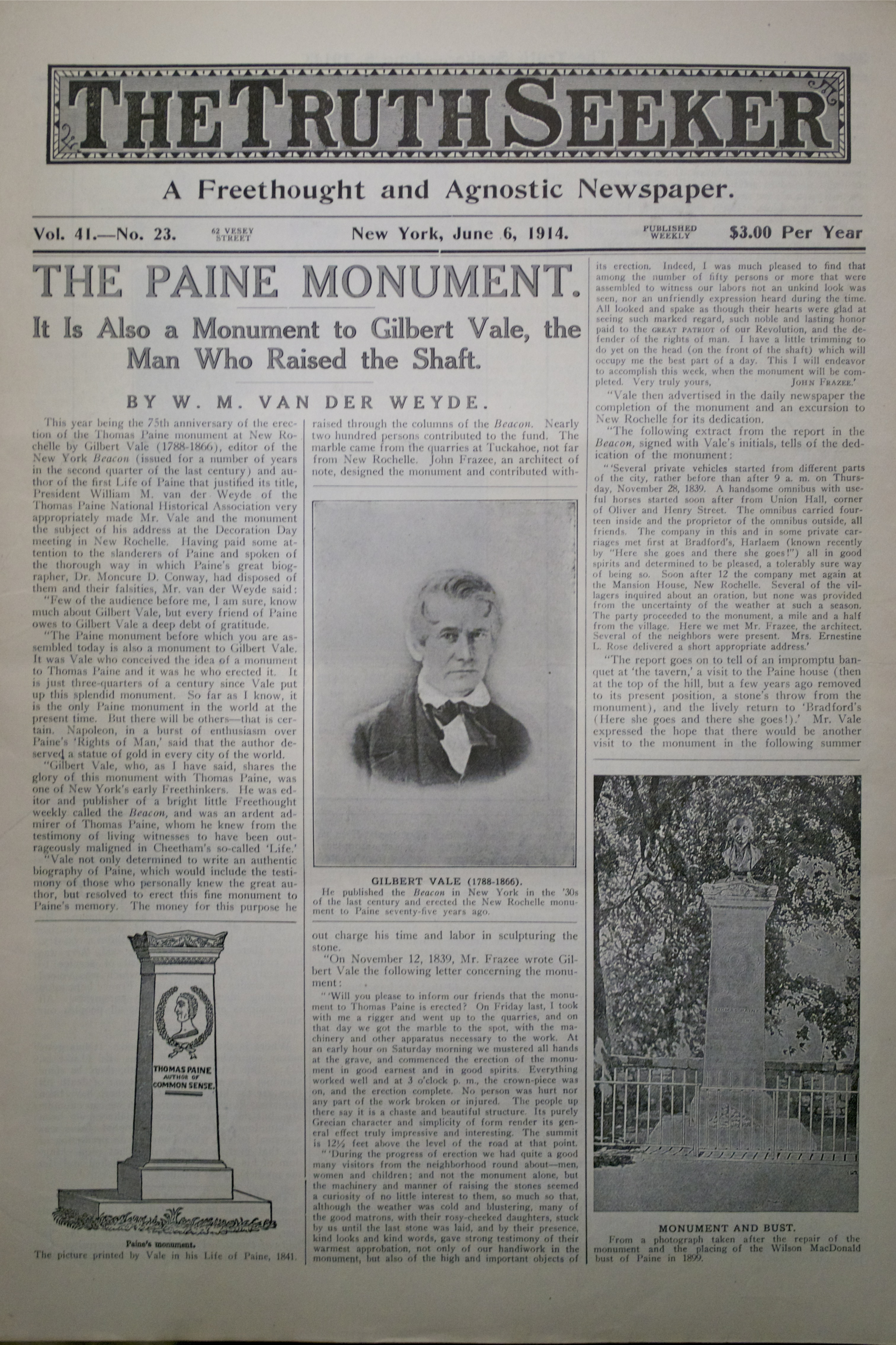
June 6, 1914

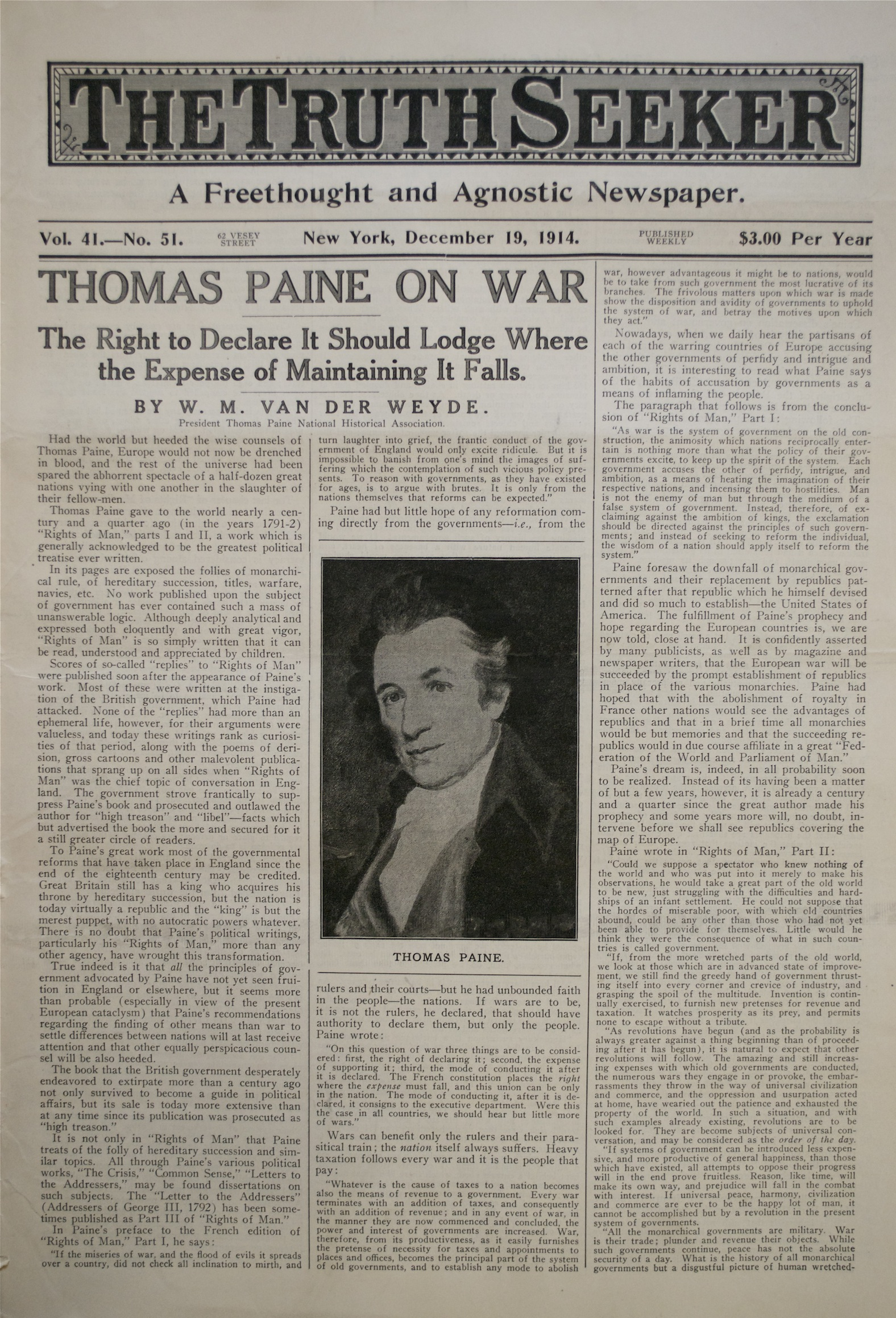
December 19, 1914

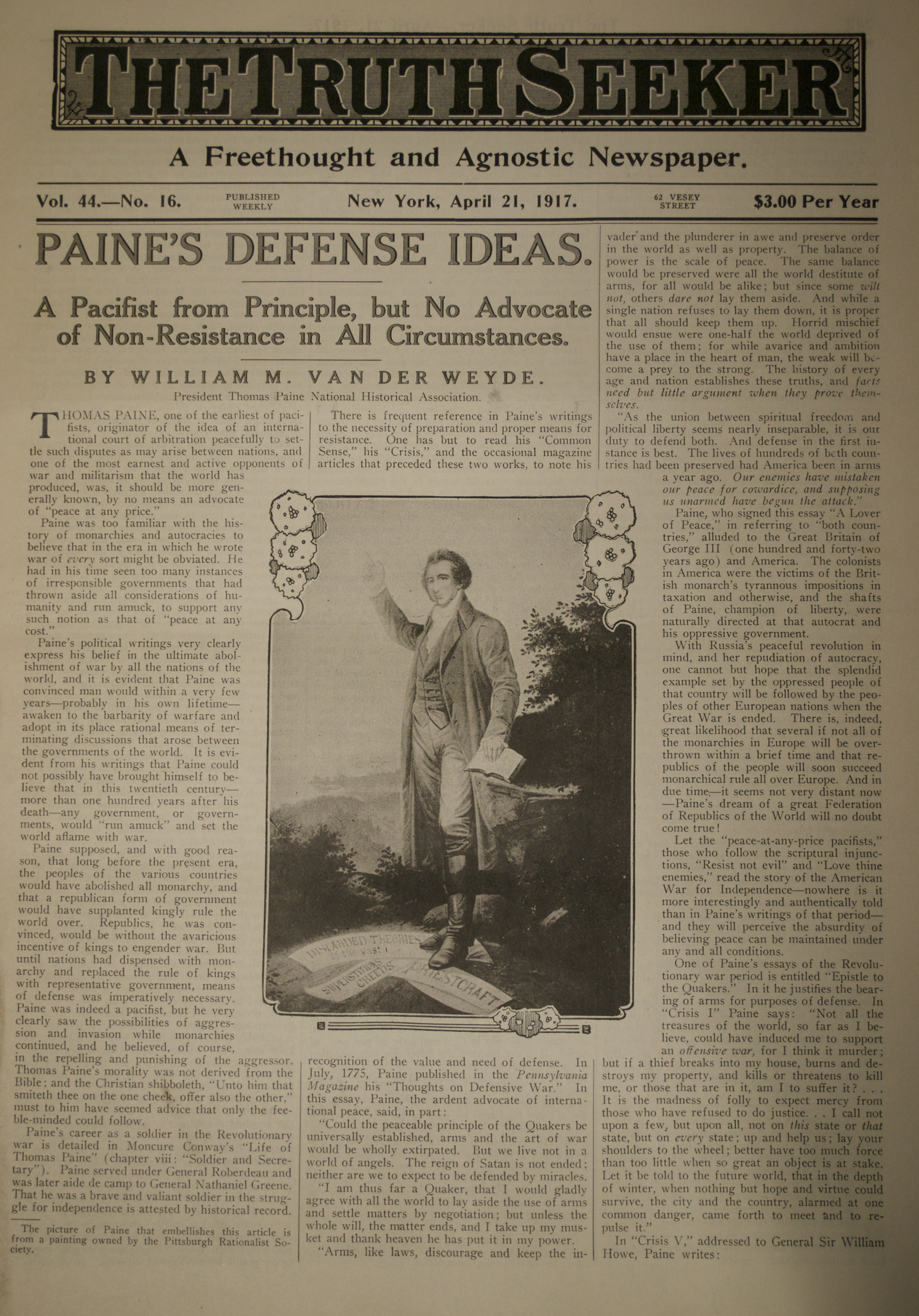
April 21, 1917

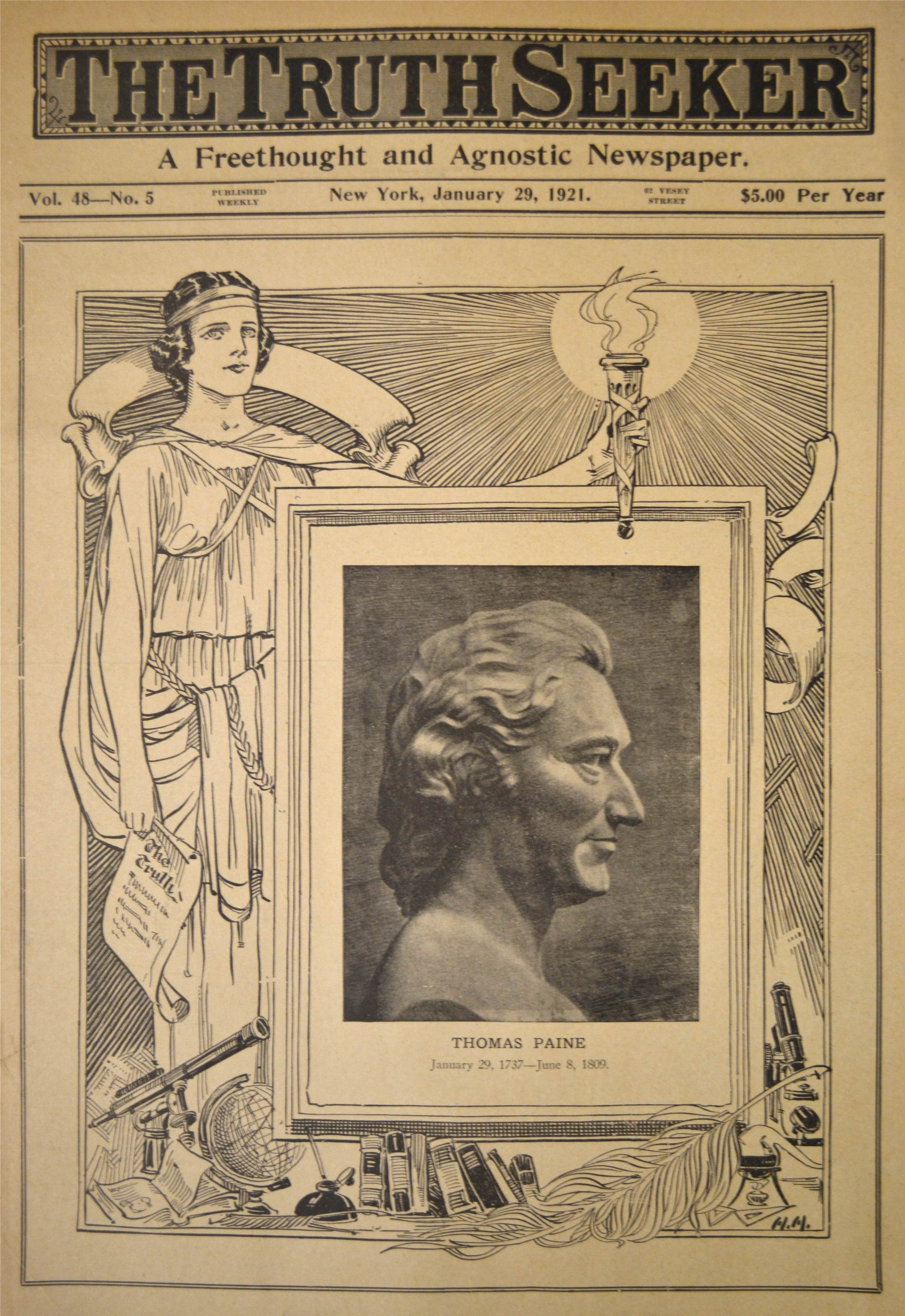
January 29, 1921
