= Charles Lee Smith =

American atheist and white supremacist (1887–1964)

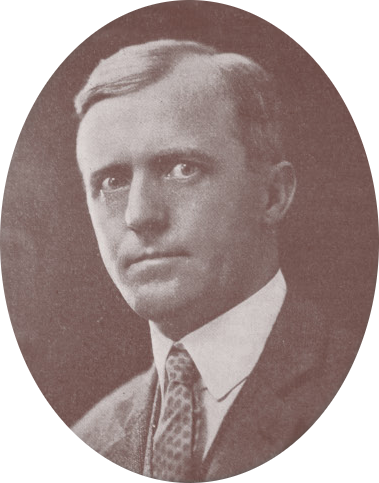
Smith c. 1937

Charles Lee Smith (1887 – October 26, 1964) was an American atheist and white supremacist author and activist widely known for being the last successful conviction for blasphemy in the United States.

== Biography ==
Raised a Methodist in Maud, Oklahoma, he entered Epworth University in Oklahoma City to study theology; however, study and debate there led him to become an atheist instead.

In November 1925, he founded the American Association for the Advancement of Atheism (A.A.A.A. or "the 4A's") in New York City, which lasted until the death of his successor James Hervey Johnson. It attempted to organize student affiliates at universities and high schools, creating at least 30 student chapters. The Los Angeles branch, "The Devil's Angels" included among its members Queen Silver, whose activities with the 4A's inspired the fictionalized movie The Godless Girl. The Rochester Chapter was known as "The Damned Souls", at Philadelphia "God's Black Sheep", at the University of Wisconsin "The Circle of the Godless", and "The Legion of the Damned" at the University of North Dakota. However, the organization declined over time.

Between 1926 and 1928, Smith came into conflict with John Roach Straton, which resulted in Straton suing Smith for harassment via the mails.

His two most famous debates were with William Landon Oliphant, a Minister, Oak Cliff Church of Christ, Dallas, Texas. This debate was held in the meeting house of the brethren in Shawnee, Oklahoma. This debate took place on August 15 and 16, 1929, and debated the propositions, "There is a Supreme Being (God, Creator)"; "Atheism is Beneficial to the Race, and is most conducive to Morality of any Theory Known to Man"; and "All Things exist as to the result of Evolution, Directed by no Intelligence". This debate was published four times in book form from 1929 to 2013.

On March 20, 1934, Smith debated Aimee Semple McPherson over evolution.

In 1935 Smith published The Bible in the Balance, which criticizes the Bible as unworthy of belief, and became a popular pamphlet for the A.A.A.A.

In 1937 Smith took over as an editor of The Truth Seeker, a free-thought magazine in New York City, where he continued as editor until his 1964 death. During his editorship, he subtitled The Truth Seeker as "The Journal for Reasoners and Racists".

== Blasphemy conviction ==
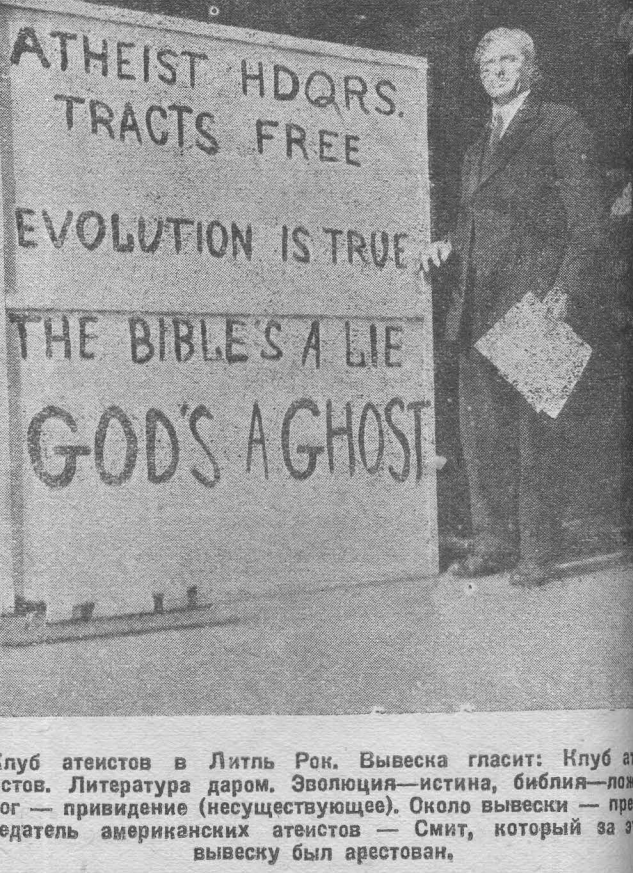
Charles Lee Smith. Signature under the image in Russian: Atheist hdqrs in Little Rock. The sign reads: Atheist hdqrs. Tracts free. Evolution is true, the Bible is a lie, God is a ghost. Near the sign, the chairman of American atheists is Smith, who was arrested for this sign. (Russian magazine «Bezbozhnik» («Godless») 1930, No. 10, p. 8)

In 1928 Smith undertook a course that ended with him the last documented person to be convicted of blasphemy in the United States. That year, Smith rented a store-front in Little Rock, Arkansas, where he gave out free anti-religious atheist literature. The sign in the window read: "Evolution Is True. The Bible's a Lie. God's a Ghost." For that, he was charged with violating the city ordinance against blasphemy.

Because he was an atheist, he therefore refused to swear the court's religious oath to tell the truth and so was not permitted to testify in his own defense. The judge then dismissed the original charge and replaced it with one of distributing obscene, slanderous, or scurrilous literature. Smith was convicted, fined $25, and served most of a 26-day jail sentence. His high-profile fast behind bars drew national media attention.

Upon his release, he immediately resumed his atheistic activities, was again charged with blasphemy, and this time convicted. In his trial, he was once more denied the right to testify and was sentenced to ninety days in jail and a fine of $100. Released on $1,000 bail, Smith appealed the verdict. The case then dragged on for several years until it was finally dismissed.

The local fundamentalist Baptist minister Ben M. Bogard, known for successfully lobbying for an Arkansas state law banning the teaching of evolution in the public schools, unexpectedly defended Smith's right to free speech in the belief that he could defeat him in a fair debate.

== Late life ==
In 1956 Smith published the two-volume tome Sensism: The Philosophy of the West, promoting a pure atheistic philosophy, viewing all supernatural religions and thought patterns as rubbish.

During the 1959–1963 proceedings of Murray v. Curlett, Smith provided financial assistance to Madalyn Murray O'Hair to cover part of the case's legal expenses; he said that he had also provided assistance to Vashti McCollum in her 1945–1947 case.

Smith died on October 26, 1964, in San Diego, California.

== Smith's ideology ==
Smith outlined his ideological views in the book: Sensism: The Philosophy of the West (1956). He was an antisemite, anti-Marxist, and a white supremacist. Smith denied the existence of God and was a staunch atheist and evolutionist. He believed that evolutionary processes also affected humanity. As a supporter of social Darwinism, Smith denied equality between human races. Christianity and Marxism proclaimed equality between people. Therefore, Smith was an anti-Marxist. Smith believed that Christianity and Marxism were invented by the Jews in order to seize power over humanity. Therefore, Smith was an anti-Semite.

== Works ==
- Evolution Illustrated. By Charles Smith. American Association for the Advancement of Atheism, Incorporated. 2 p. 192?
- Godless Evolution. By Charles Smith. American Association for the Advancement of Atheism, Incorporated. 4 p. 192?
- A Debate Between W. L. Oliphant, Minister, Oak Cliff Church of Christ, Dallas, Texas and Charles Smith, President, American Association for the Advancement of Atheism, New York City: Held in the Church of Christ, Shawnee, Oklahoma, August 15 and 16, 1929 / F. L. Rowe, 177 p. 1929.
  - 2-nd edition: Gospel Advocate Company, Nashville, Tennessee. 177 p. 1952.
  - 3-nd edition: M. Lynwood Smith Publications, Wesson, Mississippi. 177 p. 1983
  - 4-nd edition: CreateSpace Independent Publishing Platform. 180 p. 2013
- The Bible in the Balance. By Charles Smith. American Association for the Advancement of Atheism, Incorporated. 4 p. 1935
- Sensism: The Philosophy of the West: In two vol. Vol. 1. By Charles Smith. The Truth Seeker Company, New York, First Edition, LVI, 732 p. 1956.
