= American Association for the Advancement of Atheism =

American atheist organization

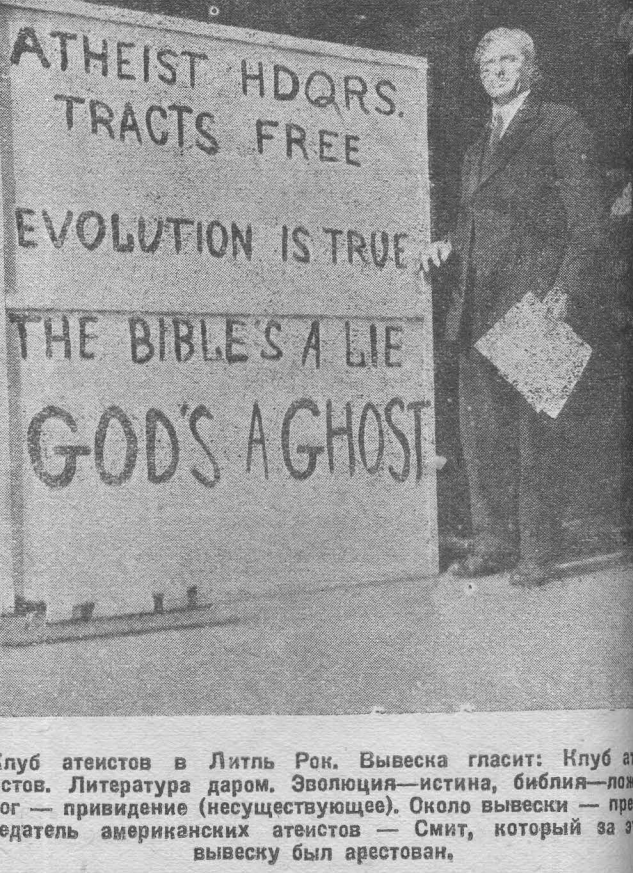
- Charles Lee Smith was the founder of the American Association for the Advancement of Atheism.
- Formation: 1925
- Location: United States of America
- Key people: Charles Lee Smith; James Hervey Johnson
- Affiliations: Junior Atheist League

The American Association for the Advancement of Atheism (AAAA – 4A) was an atheistic and antireligious organization established in 1925. It was founded by Charles Lee Smith, and the organization's "only creedal requirement was a formal profession of atheism".

== Activities ==
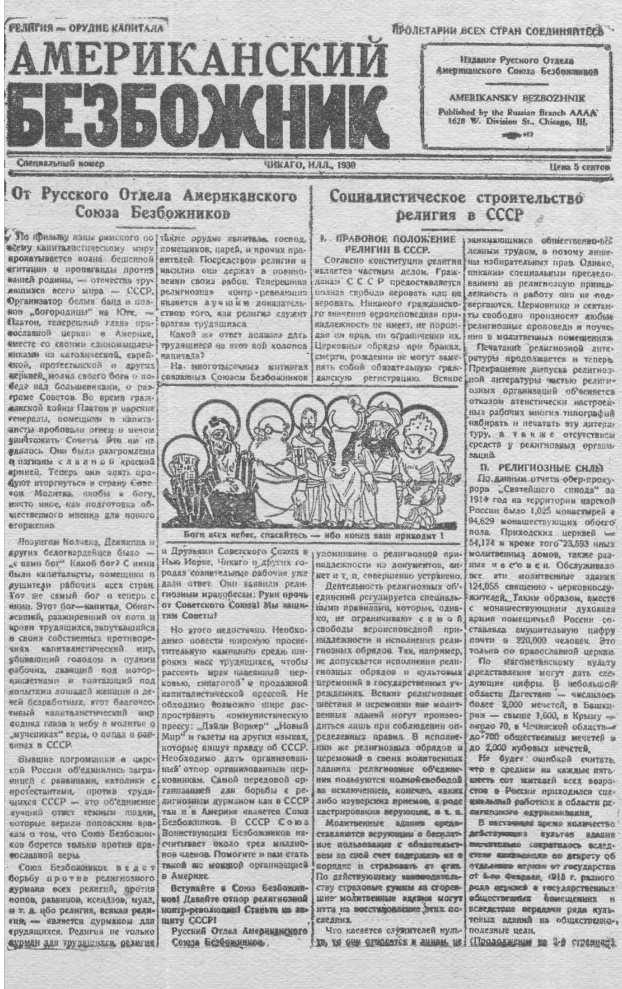
Newspaper in Russian «Amerikansky Bezbozhnik» («American Godless») 1930. Special issue with editorial against the Crusade of the Pope. Published in Chicago. 1628 W. Division St. Published by the Russian Branch of the American Association for the Advancement of Atheism

The Special Committee on Un-American Activities (1938-1944) wrote that "The American Association for the Advancement of Atheism is attempting to abrogate nil laws enforcing Christian morals; to stop 'bootlegging of religion in public schools'; to stop 'issuance of religious proclamations by Government officials,' such as Thanksgiving, etc.; to tax ecclesiastical property; to repeal Sunday (blue law) legislation; to tax and nationalize church property." The Junior Atheist League was founded in 1927, and enrolled students from the age of seven to seventeen.

Elizabeth Dilling in The Red Network wrote that "Blamegiving Day has been officially established by the Association as a day of protest against Thanksgiving services." The program for a Blamegiving event run by the American Association for the Advancement of Atheism advertised itself as “a protest against Divine negligence, to be observed each year on Thanksgiving Day, on the assumption, for the day only, that God exists.” The New York Times further delineates Blamesgiving Day, writing that "A protest sermon explained the purpose of Blamesgiving: 'While others are expressing their gratefulness for the good things of the past year, there can be no harm in making a similar list of things that were not so good.'

In the 1920s, Ilya Ivanovich Ivanov "submitted to the Soviet government a project for hybridizing humans and apes by means of artificial insemination" and the "American Association for the Advancement of Atheism announced its fund-raising campaign to support Ivanov's project but gave it a scandalously racist interpretation".

Charles Smith merged the American Association for the Advancement of Atheism with the Truth Seeker Organization in the late 1930s. After 1937, Smith cultivated controversy and dissent with him changing the subtitle of his publication "The Truth Seeker" to “the journal for reasoners and racists” and perpetually publishing antisemitism, scientific racism and white supremacy until his death in 1964, which resulted in alienating many from the American Association for the Advancement of Atheism.

== See also ==
- League of Militant Atheists
