= Alfred Smith =

Alfred or Alf Smith may refer to:

== Sportspeople ==
=== Association football ===
- Alf Smith (Scottish footballer), Scottish footballer
- Alf Smith (footballer, born 1880) (1880–1957), English footballer for Stoke
- Alf Smith (Port Vale footballer) (1890-1963), English professional footballer who played for Port Vale, 1913–1918
- Alf Smith (New Zealand footballer), New Zealand international football (soccer) player
- Alfred A. Smith, American National Soccer Hall of Fame inductee

=== Cricket ===
- Alfred Smith (cricketer, born 1812) (1812–1892), English cricketer
- Alfred Smith (cricketer, born 1847) (1847–1915), English cricketer
- Alfred Smith (Australian cricketer) (1908–1989), Australian cricketer

=== Other sports ===
- Alf Smith (Australian footballer) (1867–1936), Australian rules footballer
- Alf Smith (ice hockey) (1873–1953), Canadian ice hockey player
- Alf Smith (rugby league) (1915–1995), Australian rugby league player

== Other professions ==
- Alfred Smith (architect) (1850–?), English architect
- Alfred Smith (artist) (1854–1932), French artist from Bordeaux
- Alfred Smith (British politician) (1860–1931), member of parliament for Sunderland, 1929–1931
- Alfred Smith (supercentenarian) (1908–2019), at his death the oldest man in Scotland
- Alfred Smith (VC) (1861–1932), English soldier, recipient of the Victoria Cross in Sudan
- Alfred Baker Smith (1825–1896), American Union Army general
- Alfred C. Smith (1893–?), American lawyer and politician in the Virginia Senate
- Alfred Holland Smith (1863–1924), president of New York Central Railroad
- Alfred Lee Smith (1838–1917), member of the New Zealand Legislative Council
- Alfred Leo Smith (1919–2014), Native American substance abuse counselor and religious freedom activist
- Alfred T. Smith (1874–1939), U.S. Army officer
- Alfred Victor Smith (1891–1915), English soldier, recipient of the Victoria Cross in World War I
- Alfred W. Smith (1864–1933), American architect
- Alfred Wellington Smith (1840–1907), merchant and politician in British Columbia, Canada
- Alfred E. Smith IV (1951–2019), Wall Street executive
- Alfred Edgar Smith (1903–1986), American journalist and civil rights leader
- Al Smith (Alfred E. Smith, 1873–1944), American politician and governor
- Brenton Wood (Alfred Jesse Smith, 1941–2025), American singer/songwriter
- Norm Smith (Australian politician) (Alfred James Smith, 1901–1983), businessman and member of the Queensland Legislative Assembly
- J. Alfred Smith (born 1931), American Baptist pastor

== See also ==
- Al Smith (disambiguation)
