= Alan Smith =

Alan or Allan Smith may refer to:

== Sport ==
=== Association football ===
- Alan Smith (footballer, born 1921) (1921–2019), English football left winger
- Alan Smith (footballer, born 1939) (1939–2016), English footballer for Torquay United
- Alan Smith (footballer, born 1949), Welsh footballer for Newport County
- Alan Smith (footballer, born 1950), English football winger for York City
- Alan Smith (footballer, born 1962), English footballer for Leicester City and Arsenal, current pundit
- Alan Smith (footballer, born 1966), English footballer for Darlington
- Alan Smith (footballer, born 1980), English footballer for Leeds United and Manchester United
- Alan Smith (football manager) (born 1946), English former manager of Crystal Palace
- Alan Smith (physiotherapist) (1948/1949 – 2023), England and Sheffield Wednesday physio
- Allan Smith (New Zealand footballer), New Zealand international football (soccer) player

=== Rugby ===
- Alan Smith (rugby union) (born 1942), New Zealand rugby union player
- Allan Smith (rugby union) (1875–1926), Scotland international rugby union player
- Alan Smith (rugby league, born 1944), English rugby league footballer of the 1960s and 1970s
- Alan Smith (rugby league, born 1955), Australian rugby league footballer

=== Other sports ===
- Alan Smith (cricketer) (born 1936), English cricketer
- Alan Smith (sport shooter) (born 1958), Australian sports shooter
- Alan Smith (sailor) (born 1964), New Zealand Olympic sailor
- Allan Smith (sailor), British Paralympic sailor
- Alan Smith (speedway rider) (1930–1999), English motorcycle speedway rider
- Allan Smith (diver) (1929–2023), Sri Lankan diver
- Allan Smith (high jumper) (born 1992), British athlete

== Other fields ==
- Allan Smith (solicitor) (1871–1941), British Conservative Party politician, MP for Croydon South 1919–1923
- Allan F. Smith (1911–1994), American professor of law at the University of Michigan
- Allan K. Smith (1888–1985), American attorney and educator
- Alan Gilbert Smith (1937–2017), English geologist and geophysicist
- Alan Smith (geneticist) (born 1945), British geneticist
- Alan Jay Smith (born 1951), American computer scientist
- Alan J. Smith (architect) (born 1949), English architect
- Alan Smith (radio presenter) (born 1966), British journalist
- Alan Smith (bishop) (born 1957), British bishop of St Albans
- Alan Smith (RAF officer) (1917–2013), English Second World War fighter ace
- Cris Alexander (Alan Smith, 1920–2012), American actor and photographer
- Sam Smith (toy-maker) (Alan Verner Smith, 1908–1983), artist, sculptor and toymaker

== See also ==
- Al Smith (disambiguation)
- Allen Smith (disambiguation)
- Alan Smithee, pseudonym used since 1968 by film directors who wished to be dissociated from a film
- Alan Smythe, fictional character in BBC 2000–2005 series Monarch of the Glen
