= Al Smith (disambiguation) =

Al Smith (1873–1944) was an American politician and governor of New York.

Al Smith may also refer to:

== People ==
=== Entertainment ===
- Al Smith (cartoonist) (Albert Schmidt, 1902–1986), cartoonist whose work includes Mutt and Jeff
- Al Smith (playwright), British playwright

=== Sports ===
- Al Smith (American football) (Al Fredrick Smith, born 1964), American linebacker
- Al Smith (right-handed pitcher) (Alfred Kendricks Smith, 1903–1995), American baseball player
- Al Smith (left-handed pitcher) (Alfred John Smith, 1907–1977), American baseball player
- Al Smith (umpire) (William Alaric Smith, 1925–2006), American baseball umpire
- Al Smith (outfielder) (Alphonse Eugene Smith, 1928–2002), American baseball player
- Al Smith (basketball) (Alan Otis Smith, 1945–2022), American basketball player
- Al Smith (ice hockey) (Allan Robert Smith, 1945–2002), Canadian ice hockey goaltender
- Al Smith (racing driver) (1929–1985), USAC Championship Car driver
- Al Smith (soccer) (Alfonso Smith Jr., born 1962), American soccer defender

== Other uses ==
- Alfred E. Smith Memorial Foundation Dinner, an annual charity dinner
- "The Al Smith Dinner" (The West Wing), a 2005 episode of the TV show The West Wing

== See also ==
- Alan Smith (disambiguation)
- Albert Smith (disambiguation)
- Alex Smith (disambiguation)
- Alfred Smith (disambiguation)
- Alvin Smith (disambiguation)
- Alfred Leo Smith (1919–2014), Native American substance abuse counselor and religious freedom activist
- Albert L. Smith Jr. (1931–1997), U.S. Representative from Alabama
- Alfred E. Smith IV (1951–2019), American businessman and philanthropist
- Archibald Levin Smith (1836–1901), British judge
- List of people with surname Smith
