= Allen Smith =

Allen Smith may refer to:

- Allen Smith Jr. (1810–1890), American portrait painter
- E. Allen Smith, Auditor General of Ceylon, 1946–1953
- H. Allen Smith (1907–1976), American journalist, humorist and author
- H. Allen Smith (politician) (1909–1998), representative from California
- P. Allen Smith (born 1960), American television host, garden designer, conservationist, and lifestyle expert
- Allen Smith (cinematographer), Canadian cinematographer

== See also ==
- Alan Smith (disambiguation)
