= Alvin Smith =

Alvin Smith may refer to:

- Alvin Smith (Bahamian politician) (born 1951), Bahamian politician and Speaker of the Bahamian House of Assembly
- Alvin Smith (brother of Joseph Smith) (1798–1823), eldest brother of Joseph Smith, founder of the Latter Day Saint movement
- Alvin T. Smith (1802–1888), American politician and pioneer in Oregon

== See also ==
- Al Smith (disambiguation)
