= Alf Smith (New Zealand footballer) =

New Zealand footballer

Personal information
- Full name: Alfred L. Smith
- Place of birth: New Zealand
- Position: Goalkeeper

Senior career*
Years	Team	Apps	(Gls)
- Ponsonby

International career
1936	New Zealand	2	(0)
- * Club domestic league appearances and goals

Alfred L. Smith is a former football (soccer) goalkeeper who represented New Zealand at international level.

Smith appeared twice in official internationals for the New Zealand, the first being a 0–10 loss to Australia on 11 July 1936, which still stands as New Zealand's biggest loss in official matches, although New Zealand have been beaten by more in unofficial matches, notably England Amateurs in 1937 and Manchester United in 1967. His team fared better in his second match, losing 1–4 on 18 July 1936, their best result of Australia's three match tour of New Zealand.
