= Alan Smith (footballer, born 1966) =

English footballer

Personal information
- Full name: Alan David Smith
- Date of birth: 7 December 1966 (age 59)
- Place of birth: Sheffield, England
- Height: 6 ft 0 in (1.83 m)
- Position: Defender

Senior career*
Years	Team	Apps	(Gls)
	Sheffield Wednesday	0	(0)
1986–1989	Darlington	31	(1)
- South Bank
- * Club domestic league appearances and goals

Alan David Smith (born 7 December 1966) is an English former footballer who made 31 appearances in Football League playing as a defender for Darlington in the 1980s. He was on the books of Sheffield Wednesday, but never represented them in the League, and went on to play non-league football for South Bank.
