= Alan J. Smith (architect) =

English architect

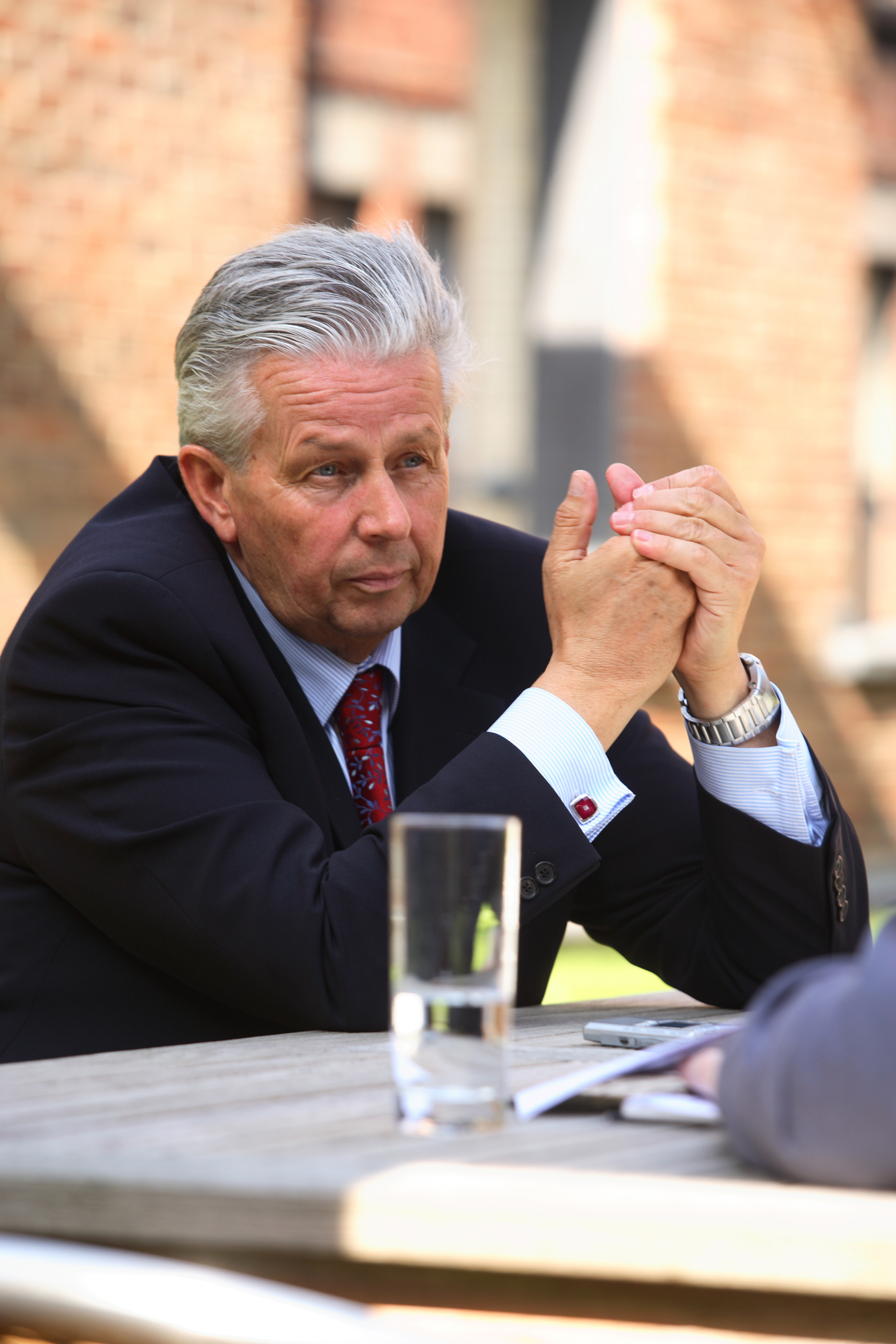
- Alan J Smith, 2008, KG Photography for Business Quarter NE Magazine
- Born: Alan J Smith; 1949 (age 76–77)

Alan J Smith OBE (born 1949) is a retired English architect who established redboxdesign group, responsible for many notable buildings in England, it is headquartered in Newcastle upon Tyne. The practice has completed projects throughout Europe.

Smith is the founding chairman of BALTIC, the Centre for Contemporary Art on Gateshead Quays.

In 2006 he was awarded an OBE for services to architecture, in 2008 was appointed Deputy Lord Lieutenant of the County of Durham and in 2012 he was appointed a Freeman of Gateshead.

== Biography ==
Smith was born in County Durham in 1949. He was educated at the Johnston Grammar School in Durham before going on to study architecture at Newcastle University. After spending his intermediary year working for the Local Authority and after completing his second architecture degree, he cut his teeth on major urban regeneration projects at Washington New Town and became a member of the Royal Institute of British Architects in 1976.

Smith moved into private practice in 1979 where worked on large residential urban regeneration projects in and around Newcastle upon Tyne before founding the Alan J Smith Partnership in 1985. He developed relationships with blue chip clients, and set up a London office in 1987 on the back of significant residential projects in Chelsea and the London Docklands working for both private and housing association clients. His first notable work in the commercial office and design and research sectors came with appointments from Abbey National, Northern Rock, Obayashi, Ikeda, Nissan European Technology, Goldstar, British Gas Energy Centres, and Benetton Formula 1. The practice set up an office Amsterdam in 1992. Smith visited Japan in October 1991 as the only British representative on the Dutch-Japanese Trade Mission led by Queen Beatrix of the Netherlands to meet with the Emperor of Japan Akihito, to celebrate 400 years of trade between the two countries.

=== Red Box Design Group ===
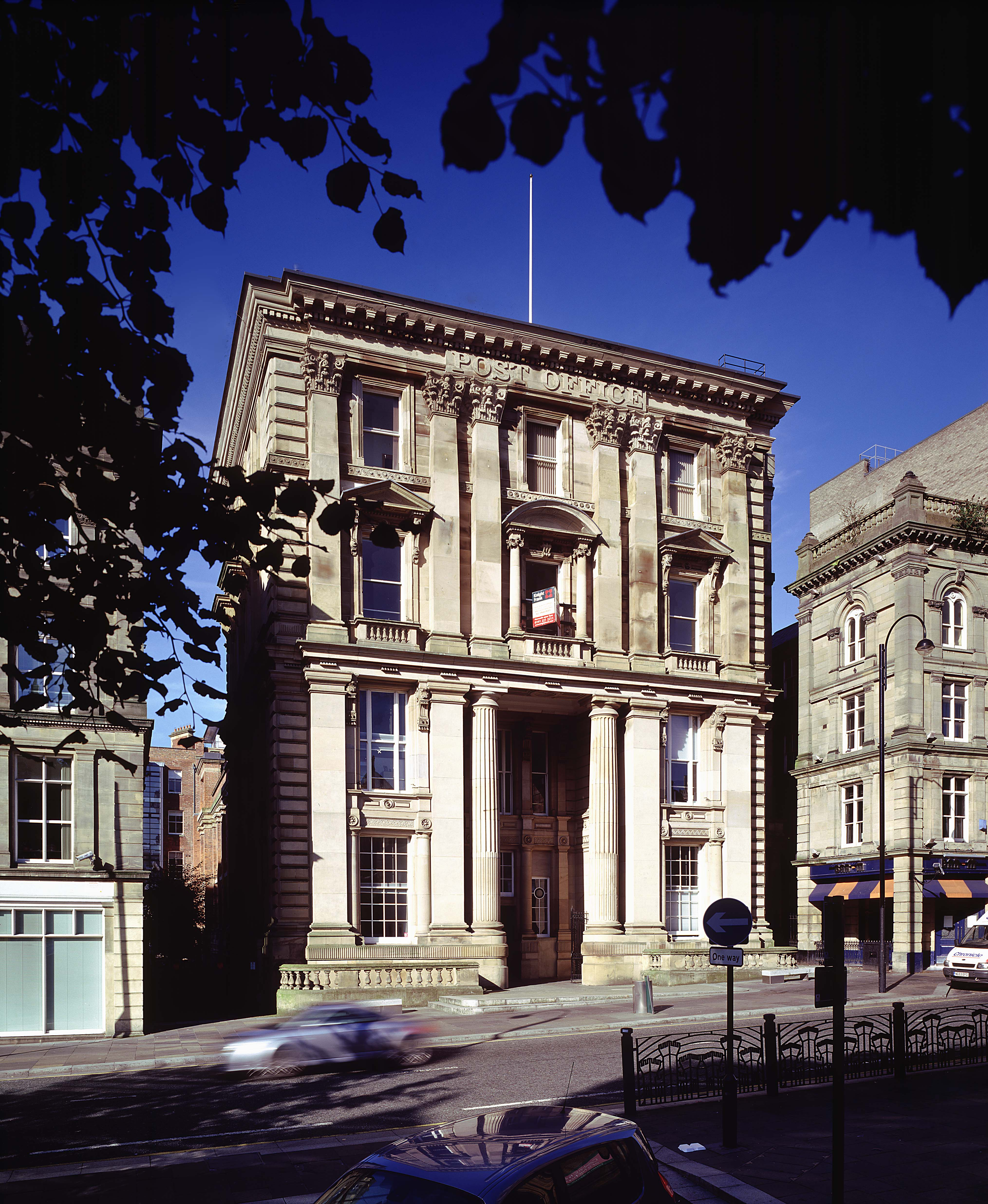
Red Box Development, Newcastle upon Tyne

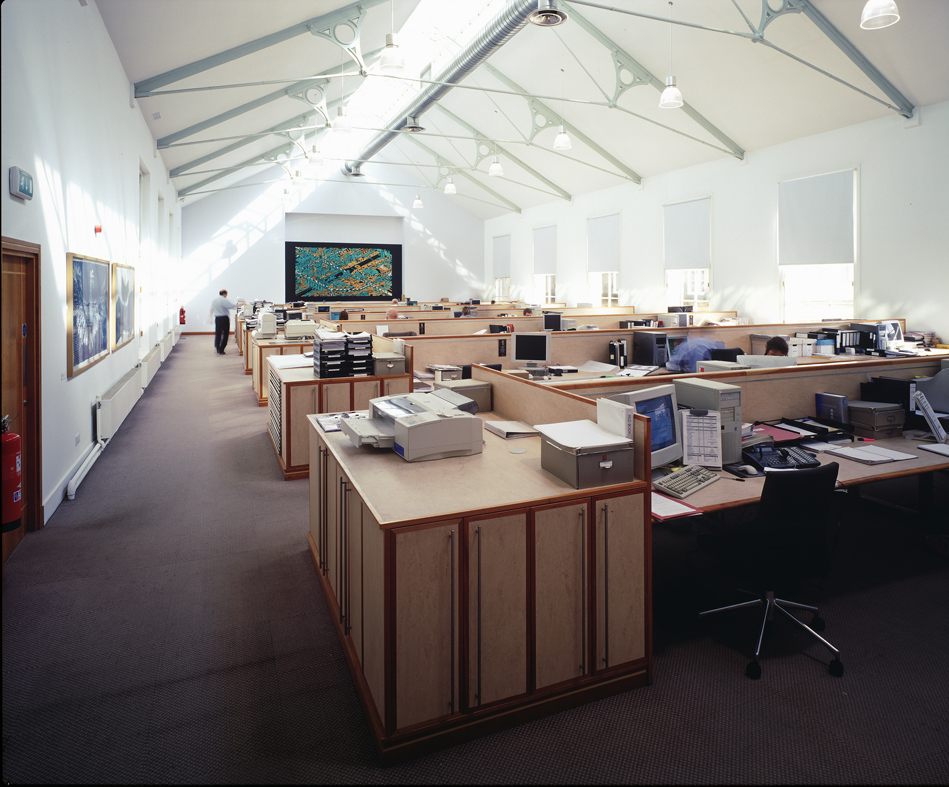
Red Box Development Interior, Newcastle upon Tyne

In 1996, before 'mixed use' really came into wide use, Smith bought and developed the listed neo-classical Post Office Headquarters in the centre of Newcastle to satisfy the need for an expanding workload. This development provided the foundation of redboxdesign group in 2000. The building was seen as the first real mixed-use scheme in the North of England and remains the headquarters for the practice to this day.

The development has been praised by the Duke of Gloucester in his role as an English Heritage Commissioner:

"It is so easy for developers to send in the bulldozers to start work with a clean sheet of paper, but it requires special courage to see a building for what it is, and to see that it is wasteful both in terms of materials to do this, and that it also breaks down the cohesion of a City to have its history removed simply for administrative convenience. The other thing of course, is that to make an old building work, you have to think harder and it is the architect’s prerogative to say that thinking always gives value for money and that there is always a better way of doing almost anything you think of if you consider it a bit harder".

In 2000 Smith assumed the position of chairman of redboxdesign group. The change of name saw the business develop further. Work with Northern Rock as well as with Sunderland Football Club, Durham County Cricket Club, Hilton International and Radisson Hotels. Expansion also included work in Moscow for Yukos Oil, designing for them a new research and development facility for nanotechnology.

=== Present day ===
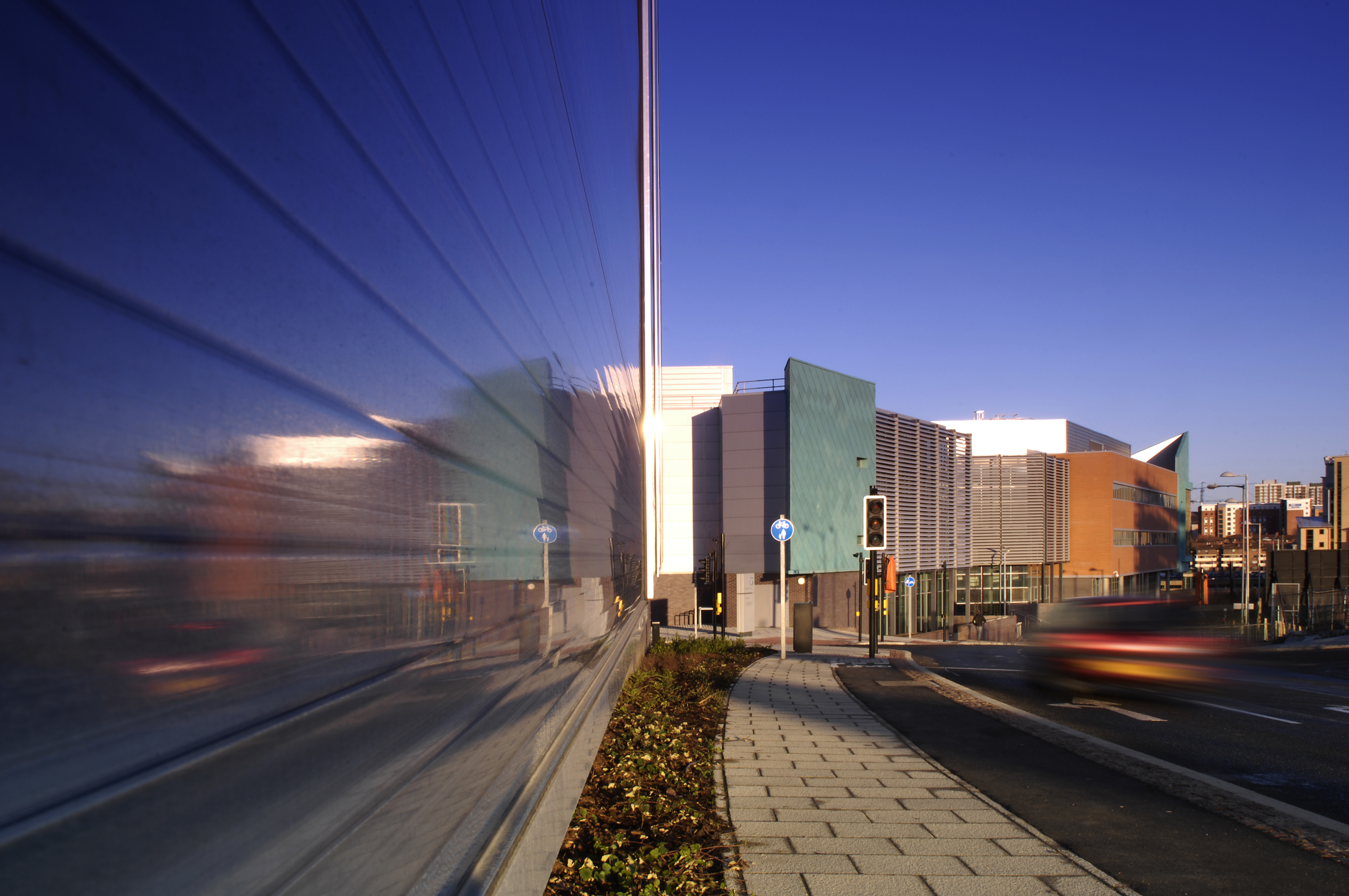
Gateshead College, by architects redboxdesign group

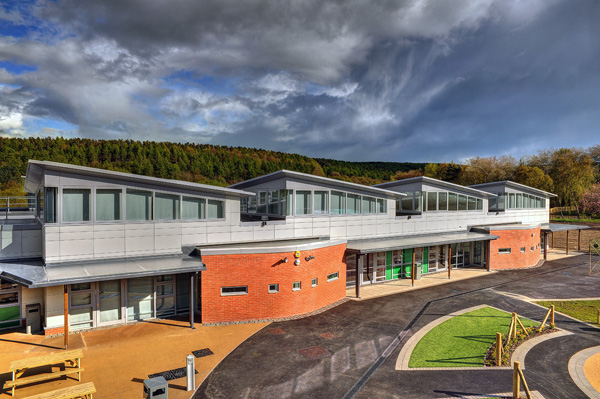
Esh Winning School, by architects redboxdesign group

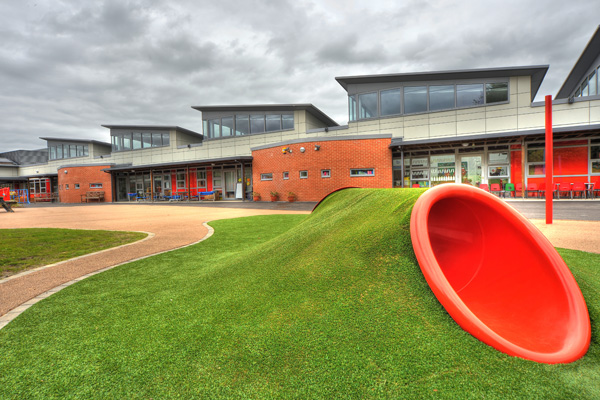
Brandon School, by architects redboxdesign group

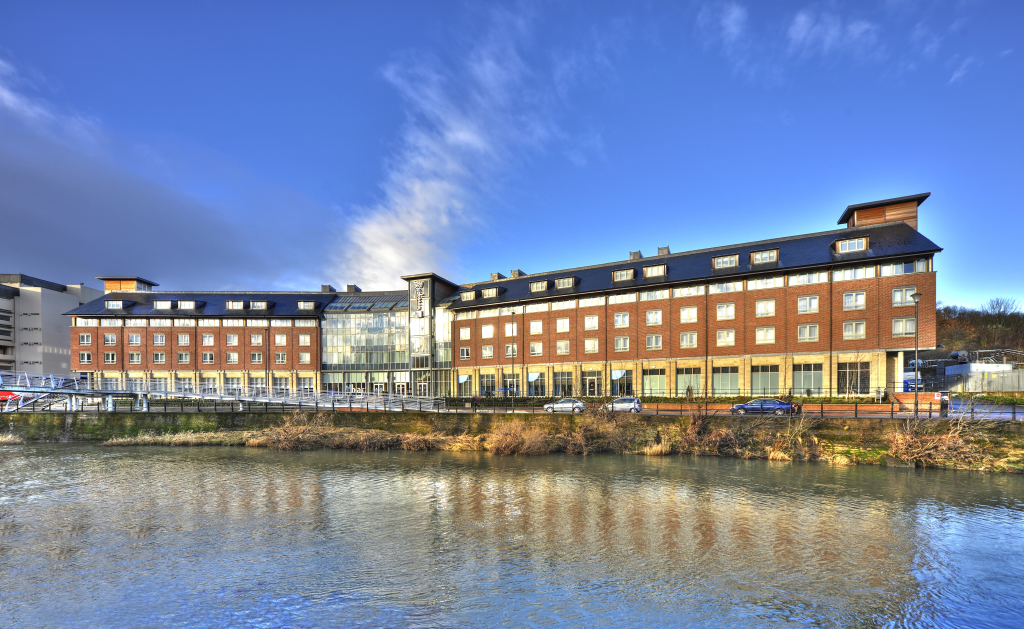
Durham Radisson SAS, by architects redboxdesign group

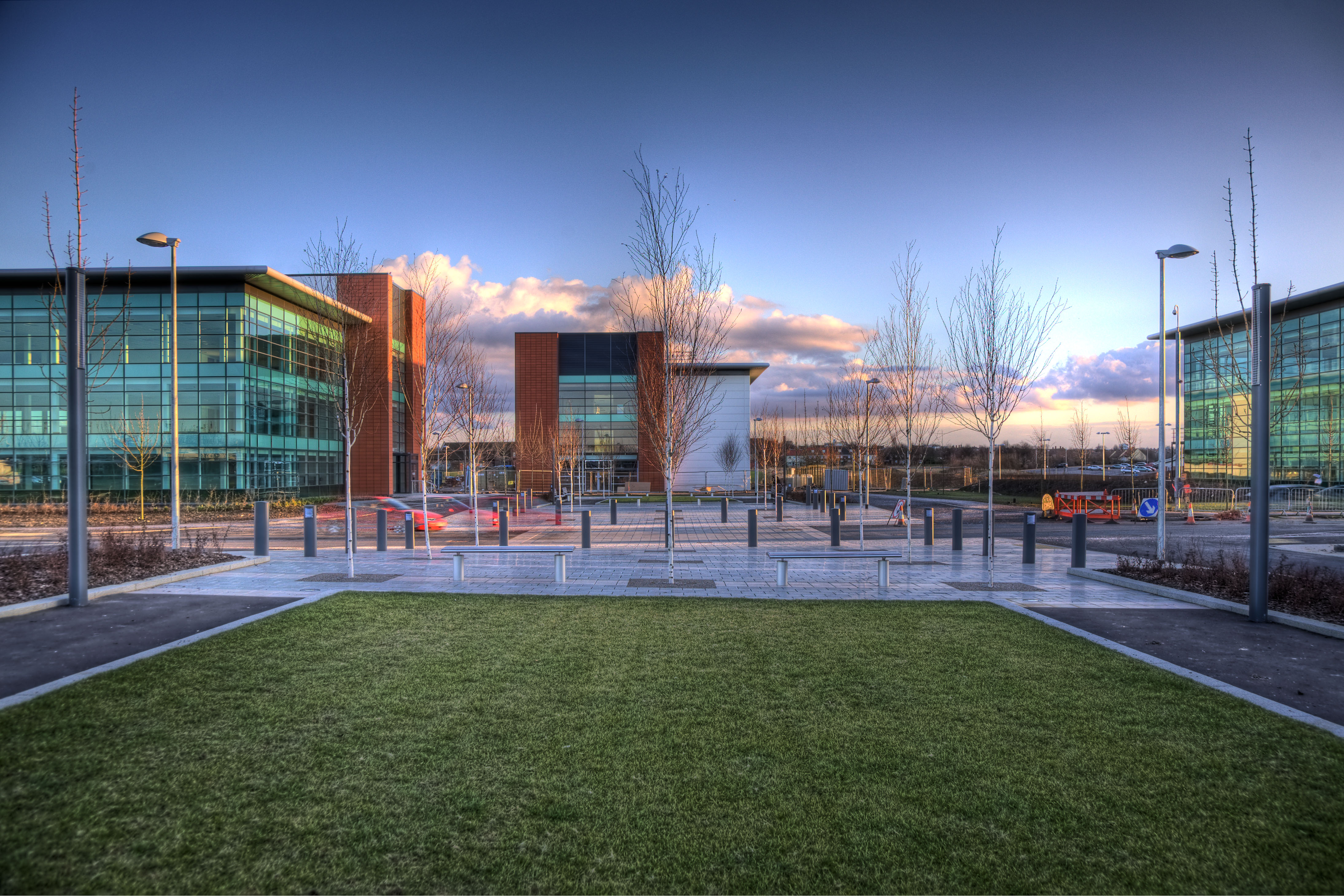
Quorum Business Park, by architects redboxdesign group

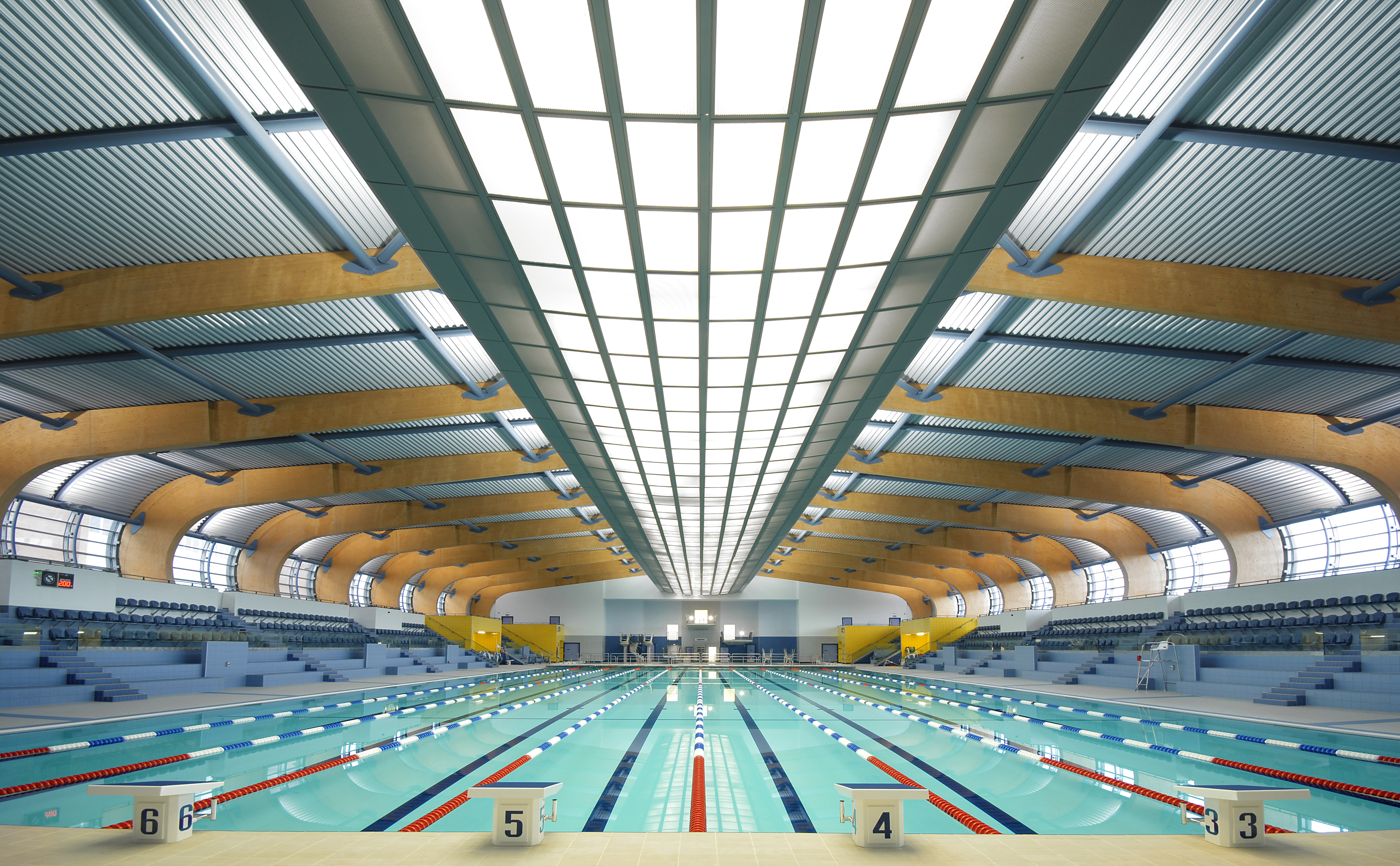
Sunderland Aquatic Centre, by architects redboxdesign group

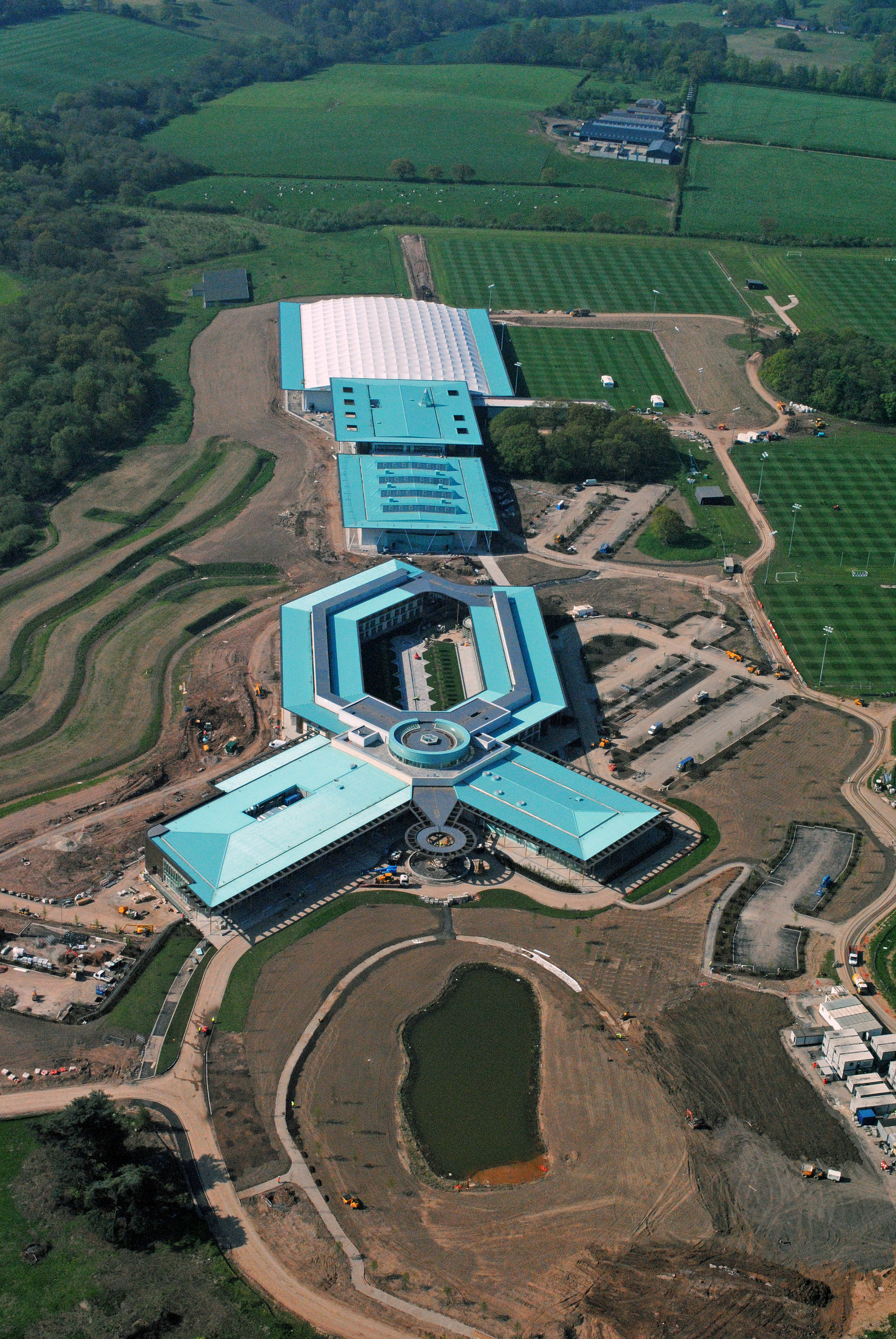
St George's Park, by architects redboxdesign group

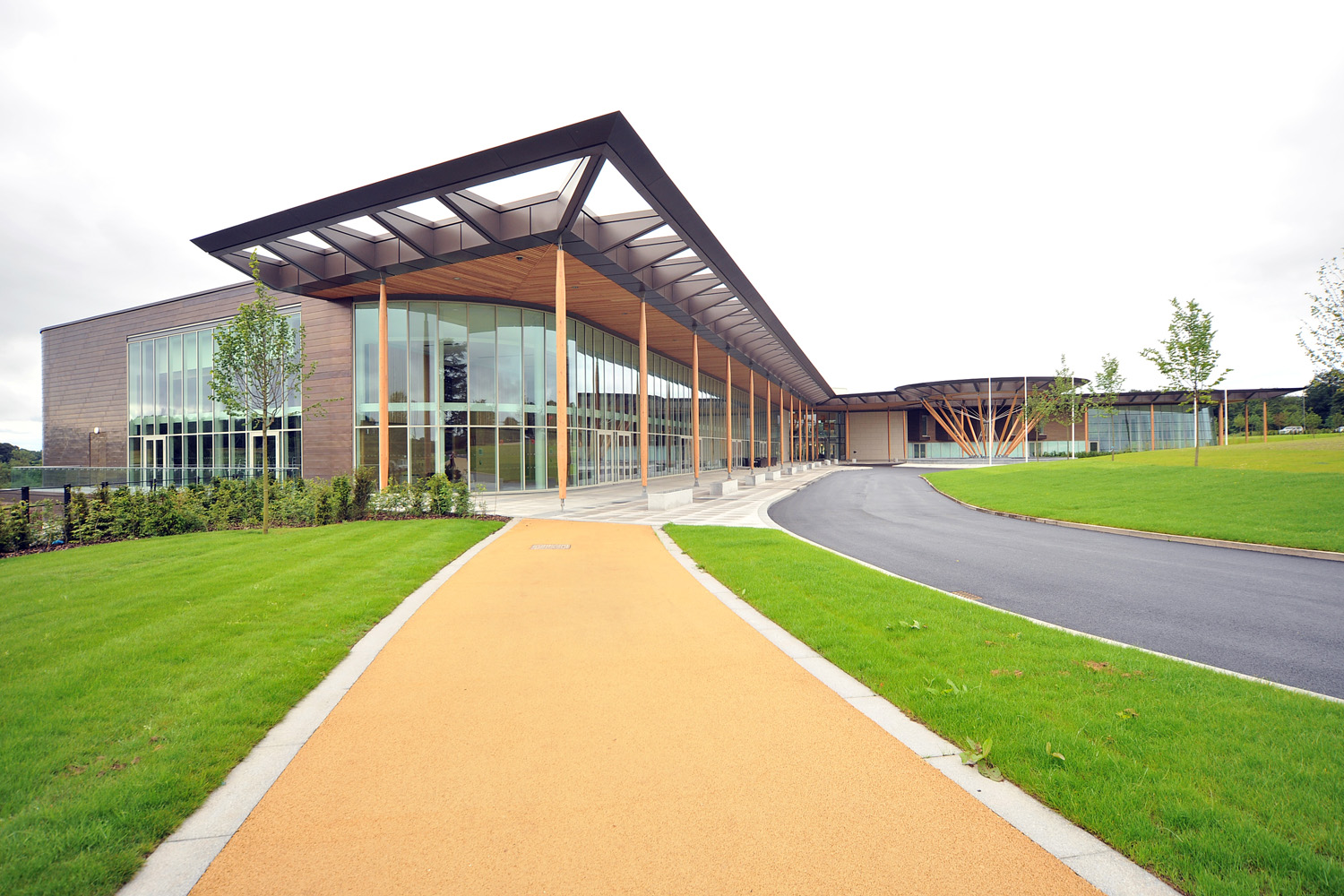
St George's Park, by architects redboxdesign group

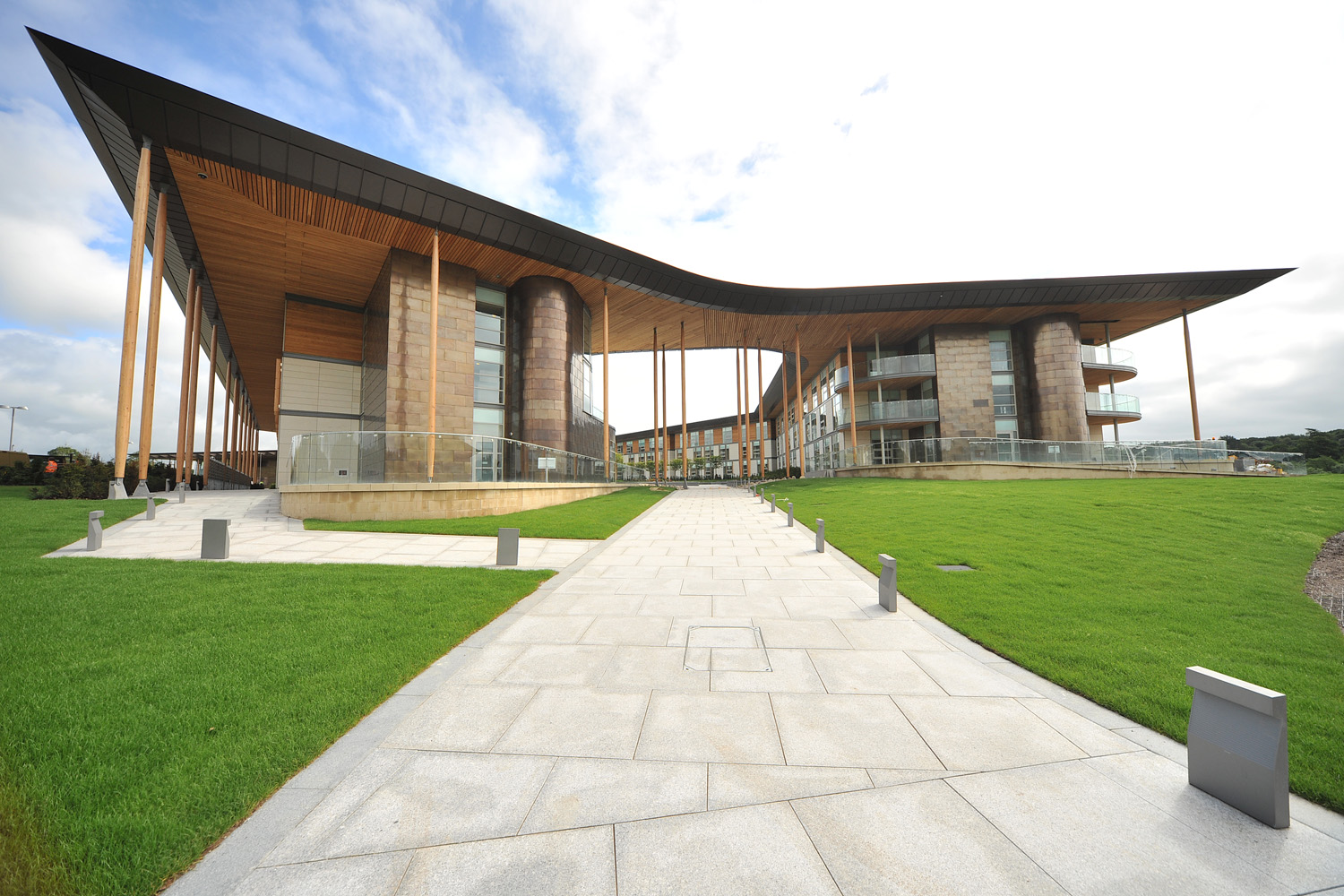
St George's Park, by architects redboxdesign group

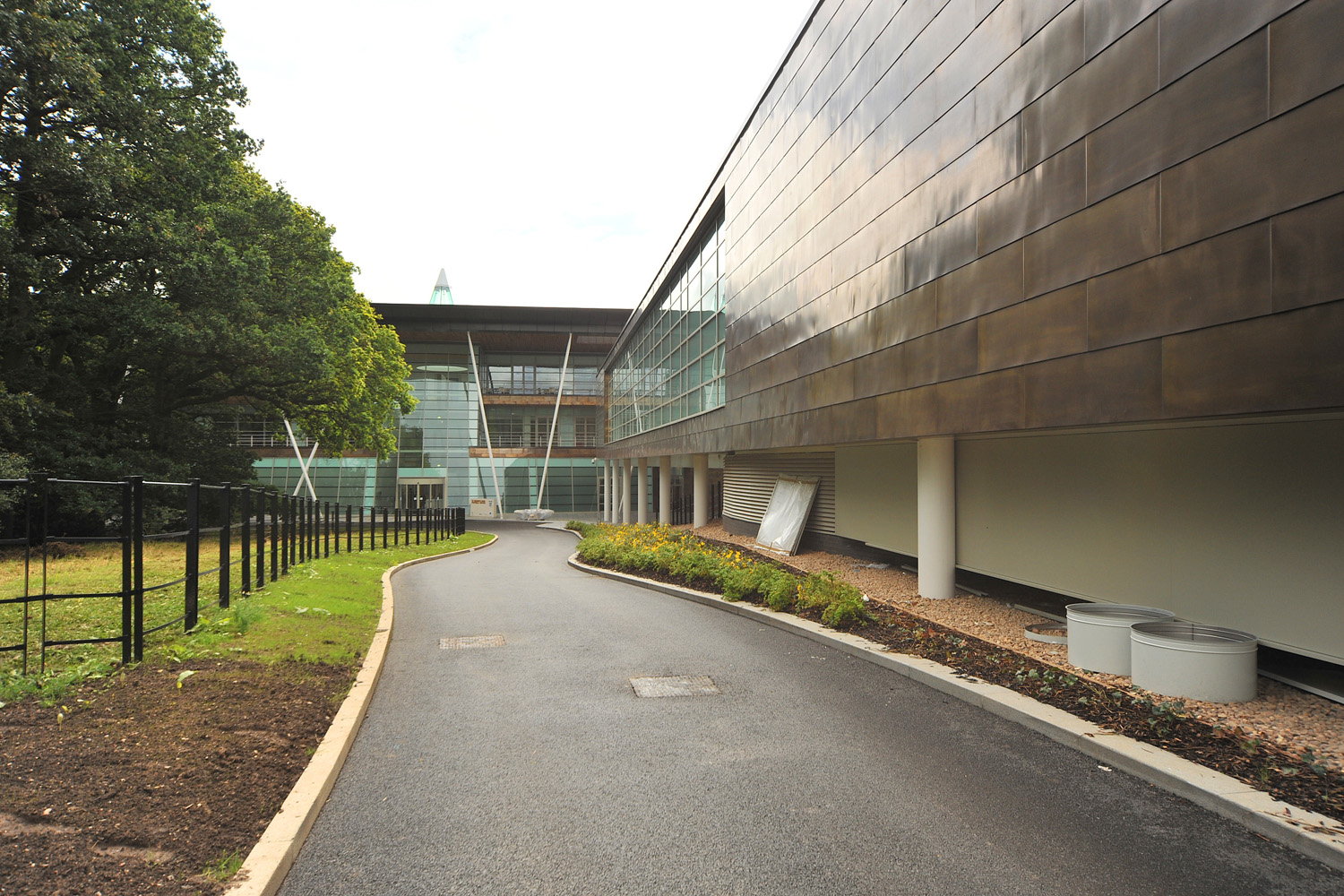
St George's Park, by architects redboxdesign group

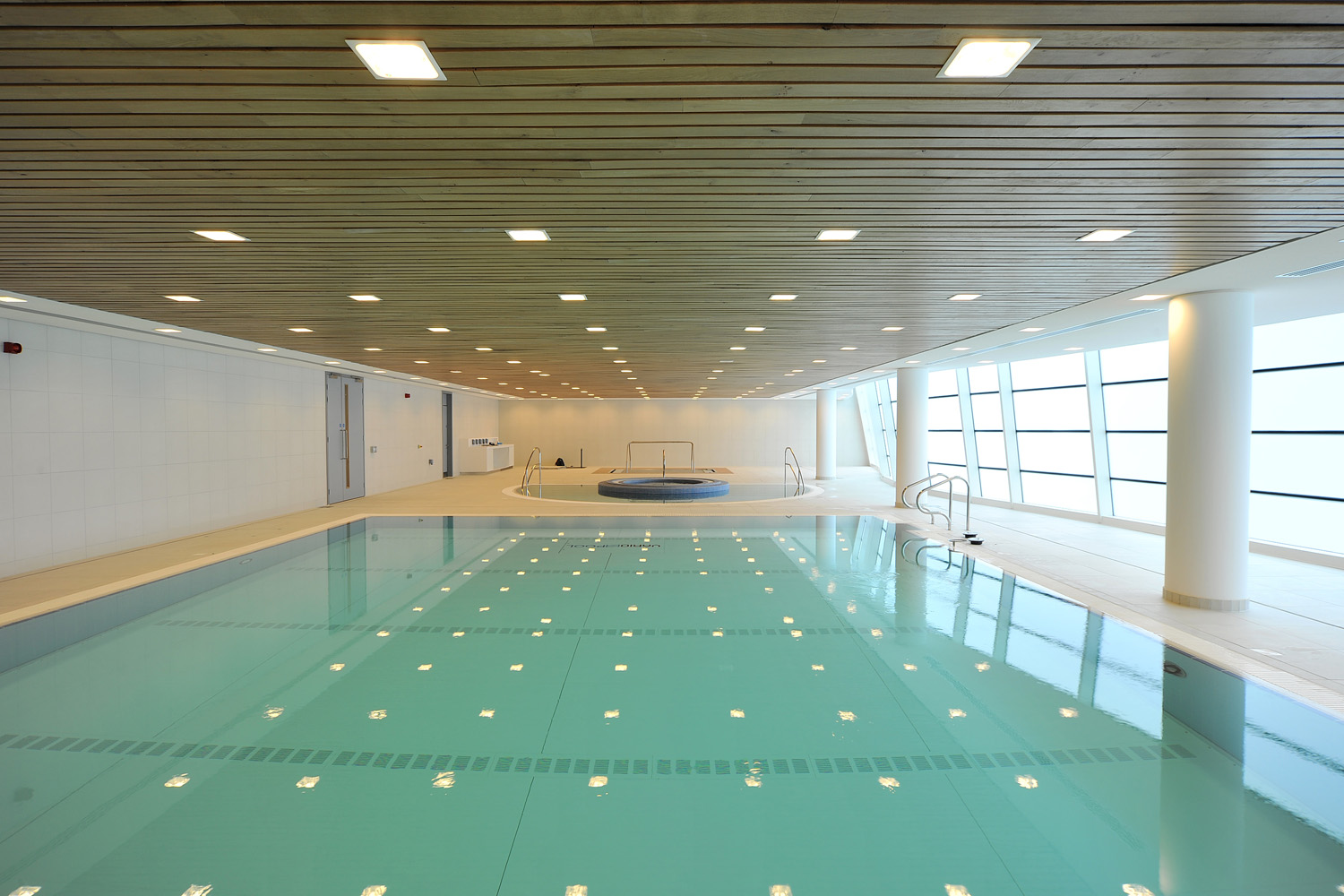
St George's Park, by architects redboxdesign group

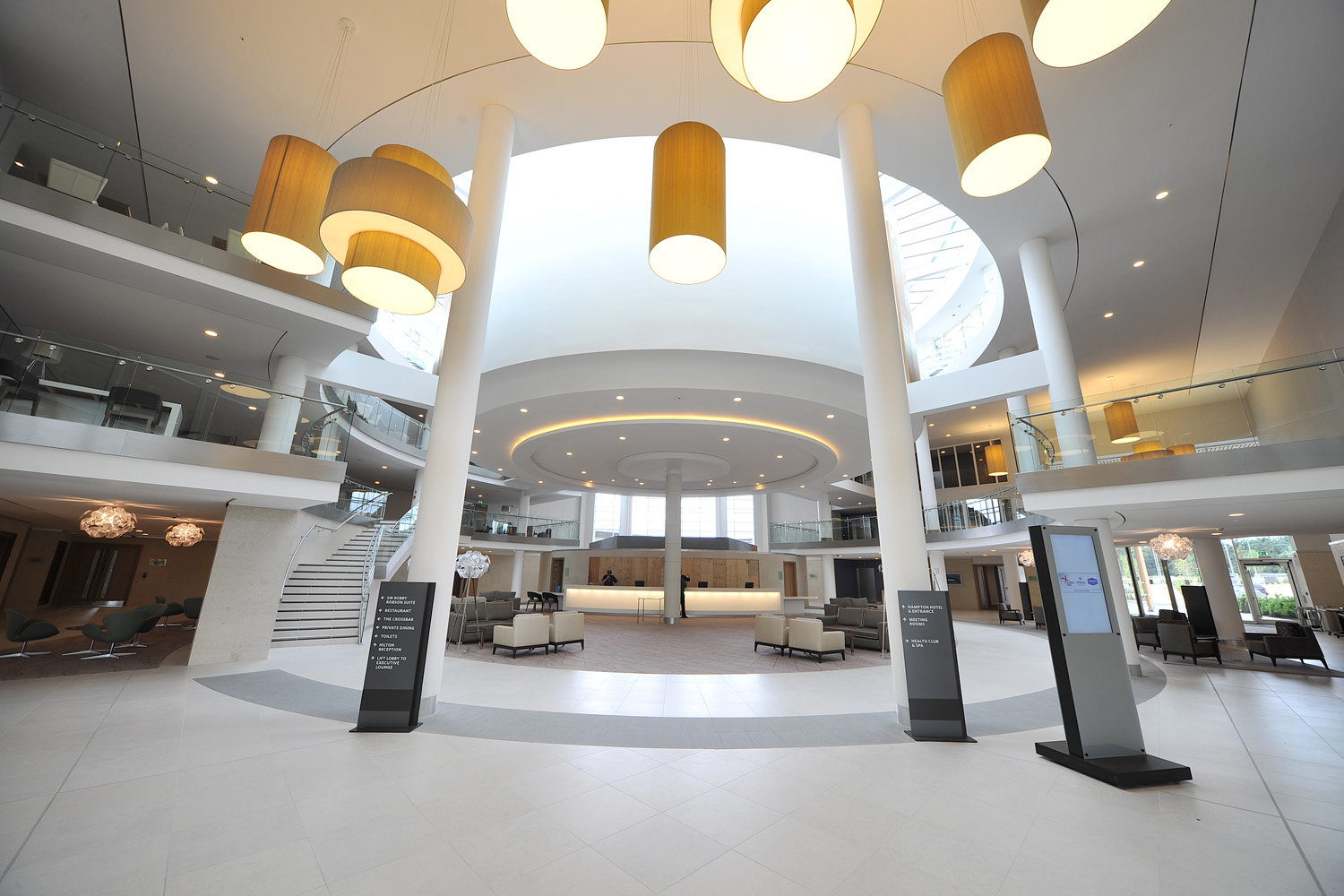
St George's Park, by architects redboxdesign group

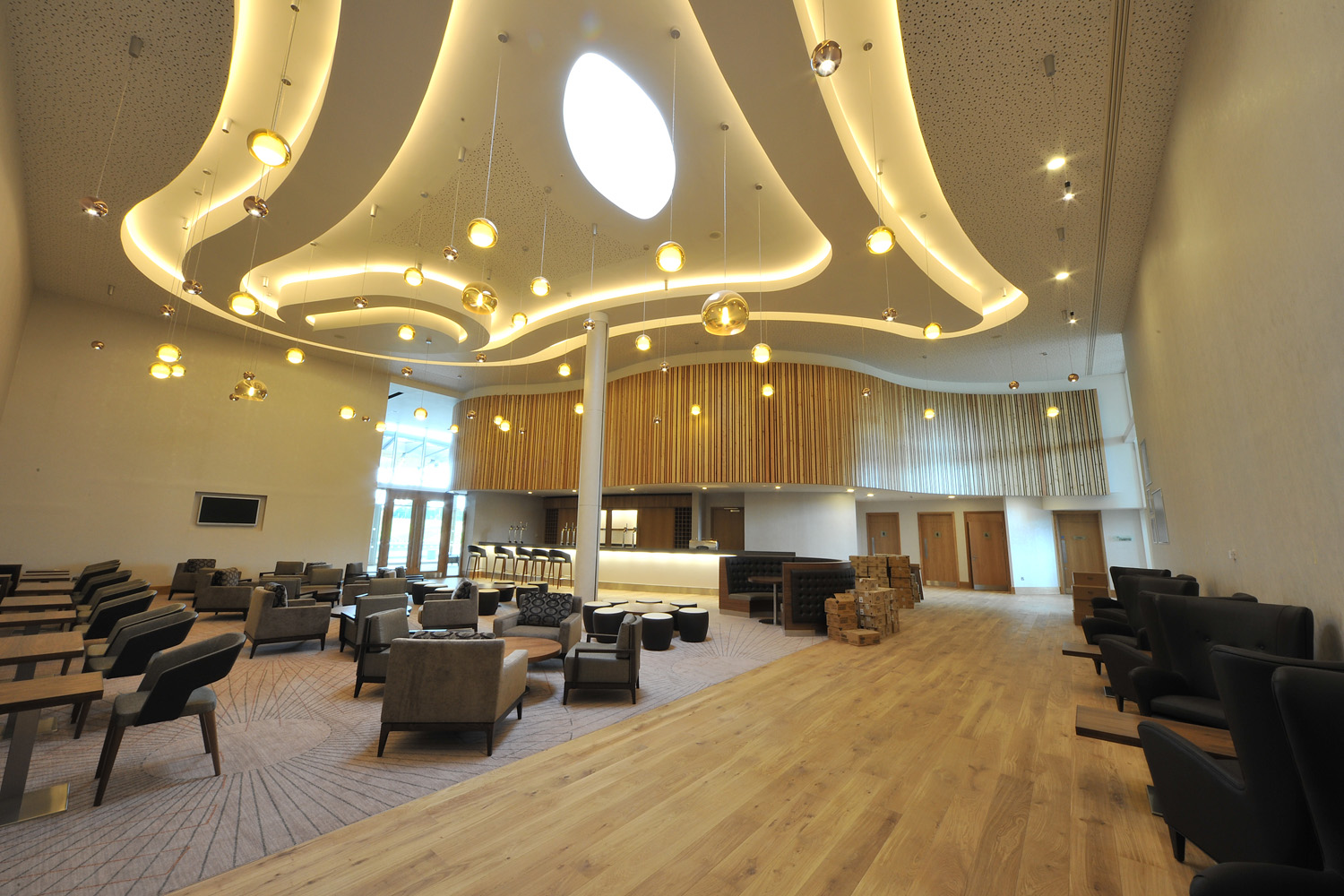
St George's Park, by architects redboxdesign group

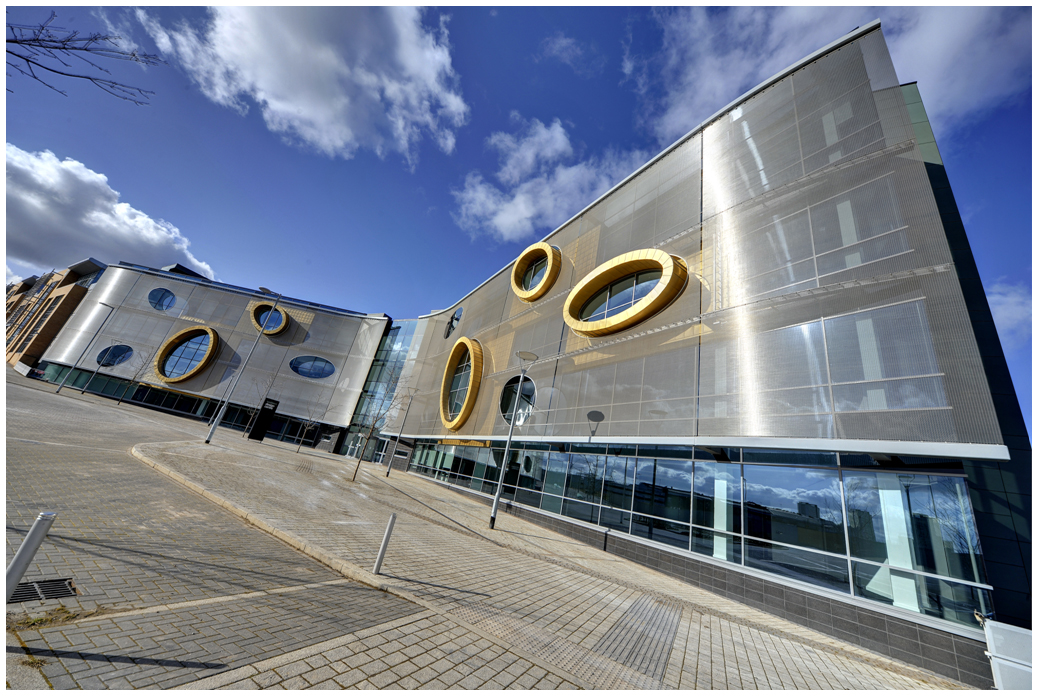
Northern Design Centre, by architects redboxdesign group

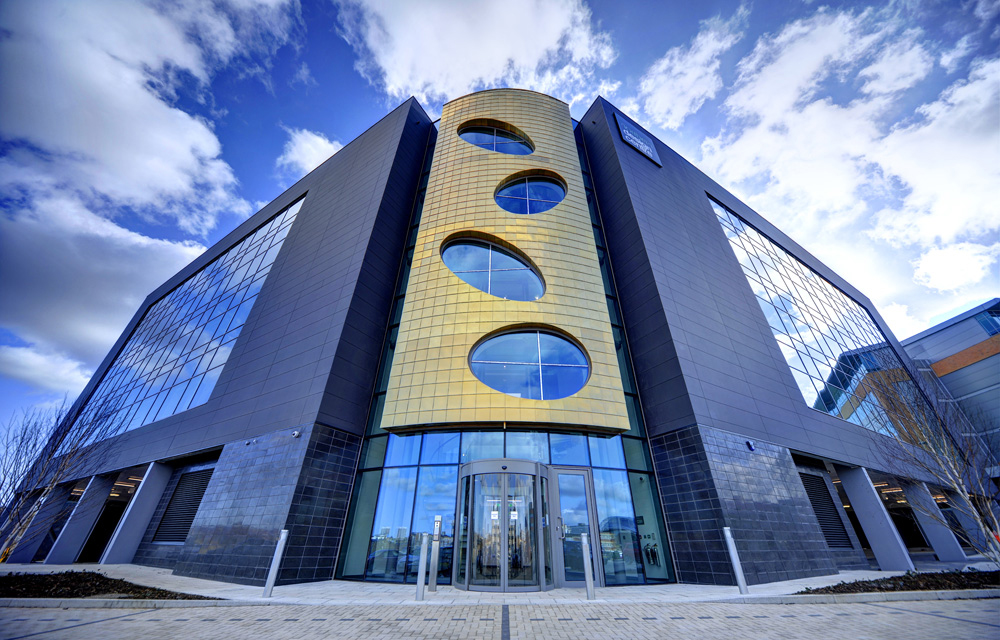
Northern Design Centre, by architects redboxdesign group

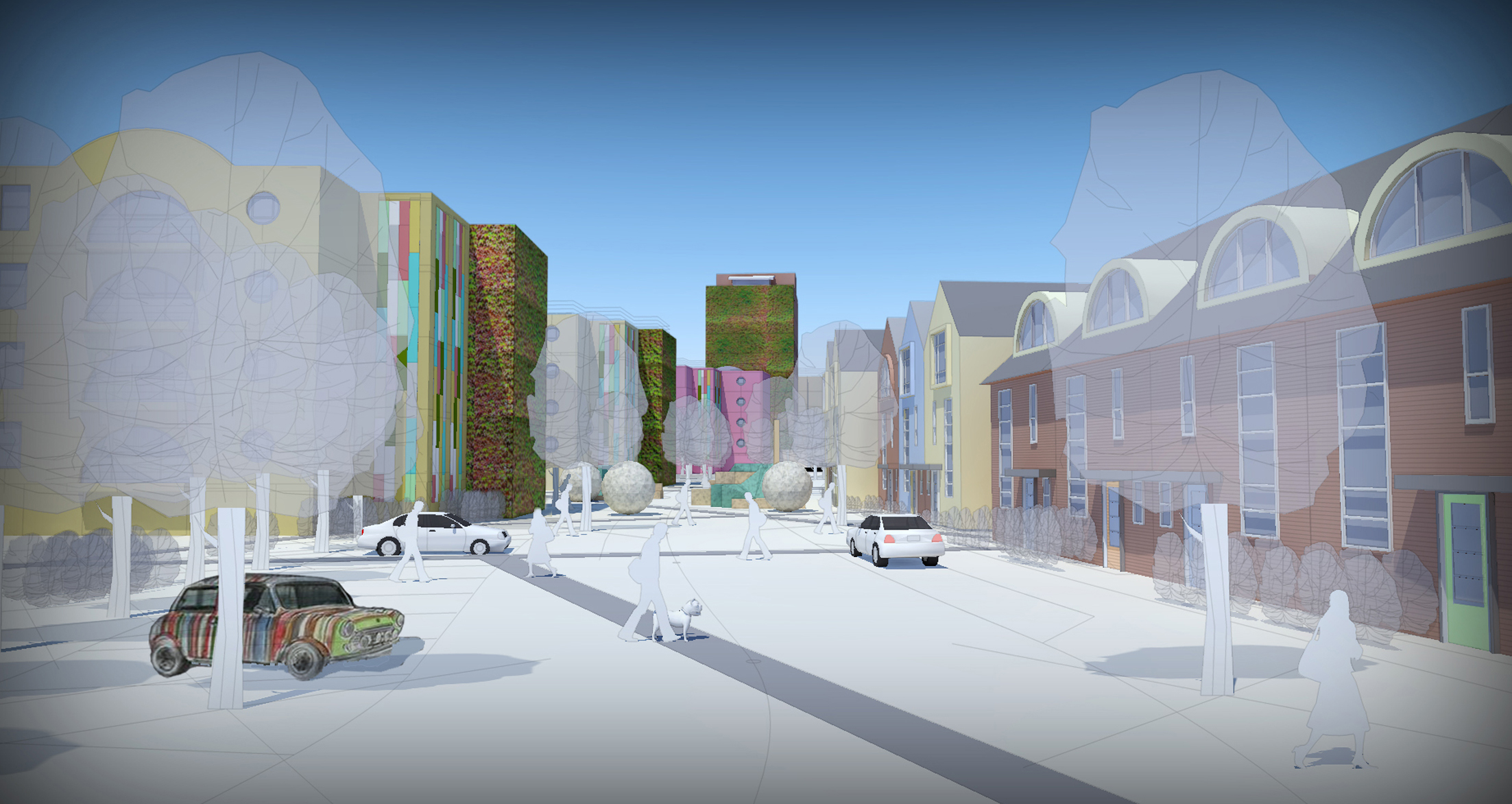
Sandfields, by architects redboxdesign group

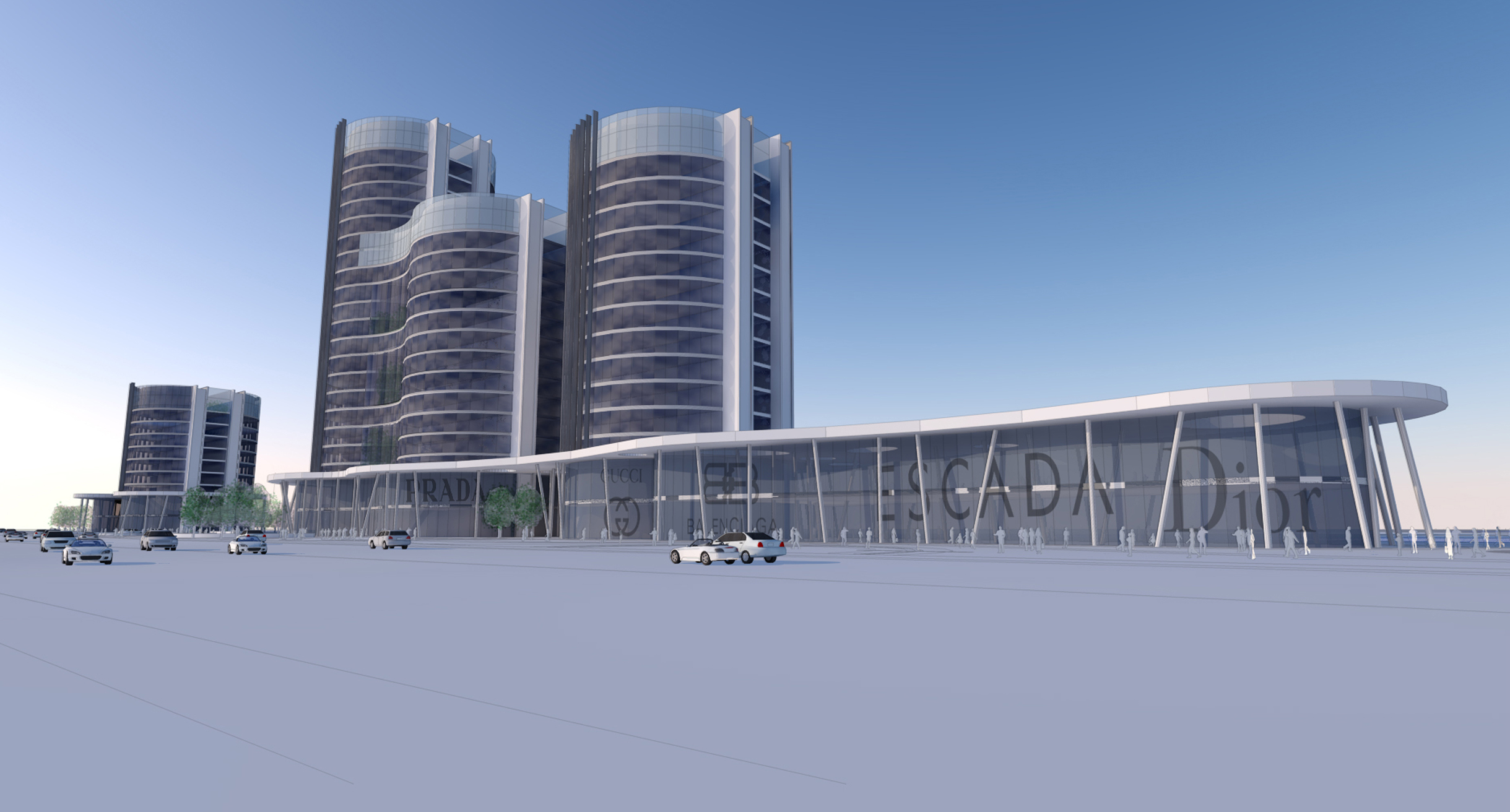
'The Offices' project, Changsha, China, by architects redboxdesign group

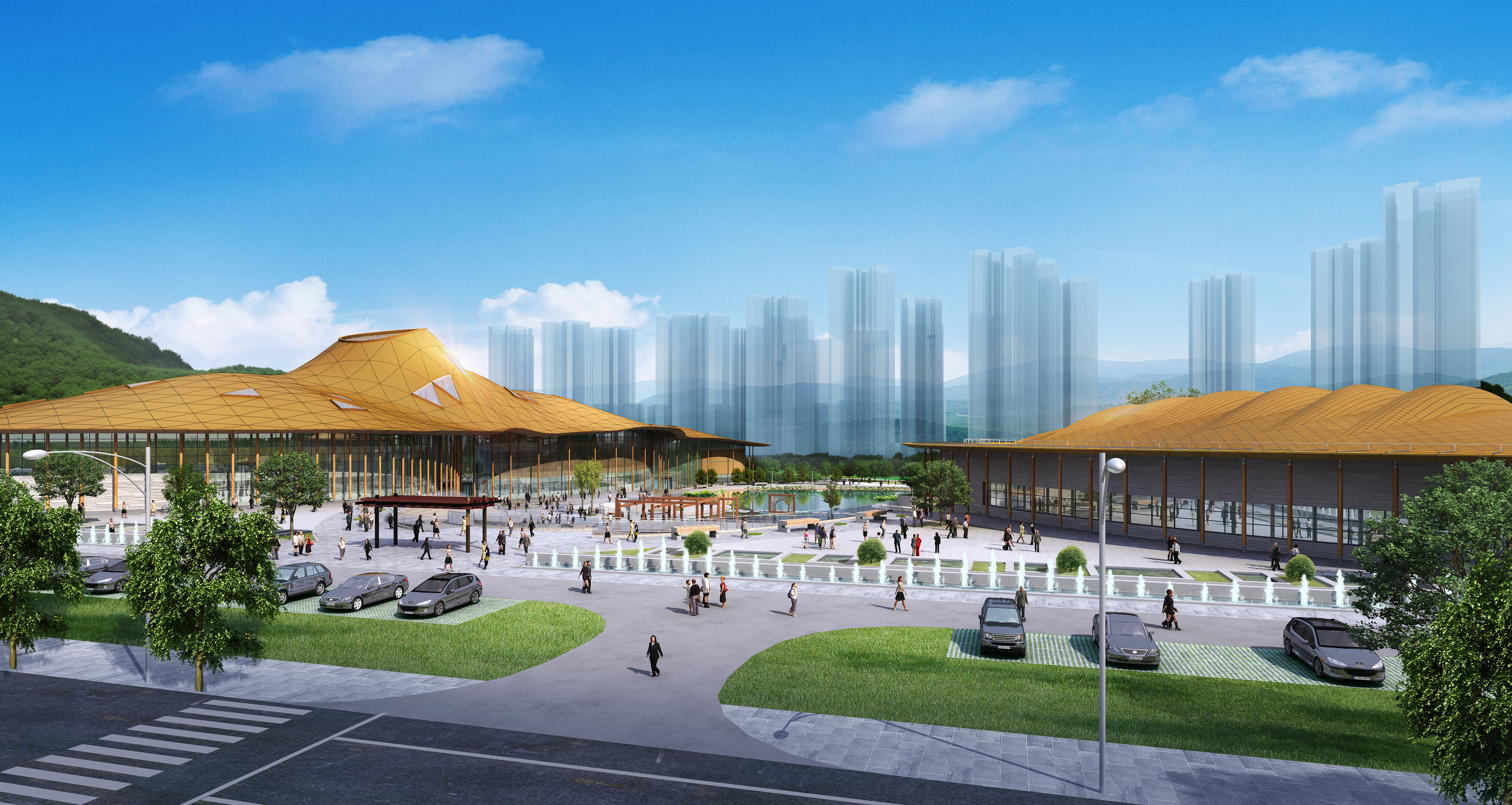
Zhuzhuo, China. The Zhuzhuo Activity Centre for Women, Children, Juveniles and Elder Persons. View from Shen Nong Avenue looking east. CGI image, December 2012

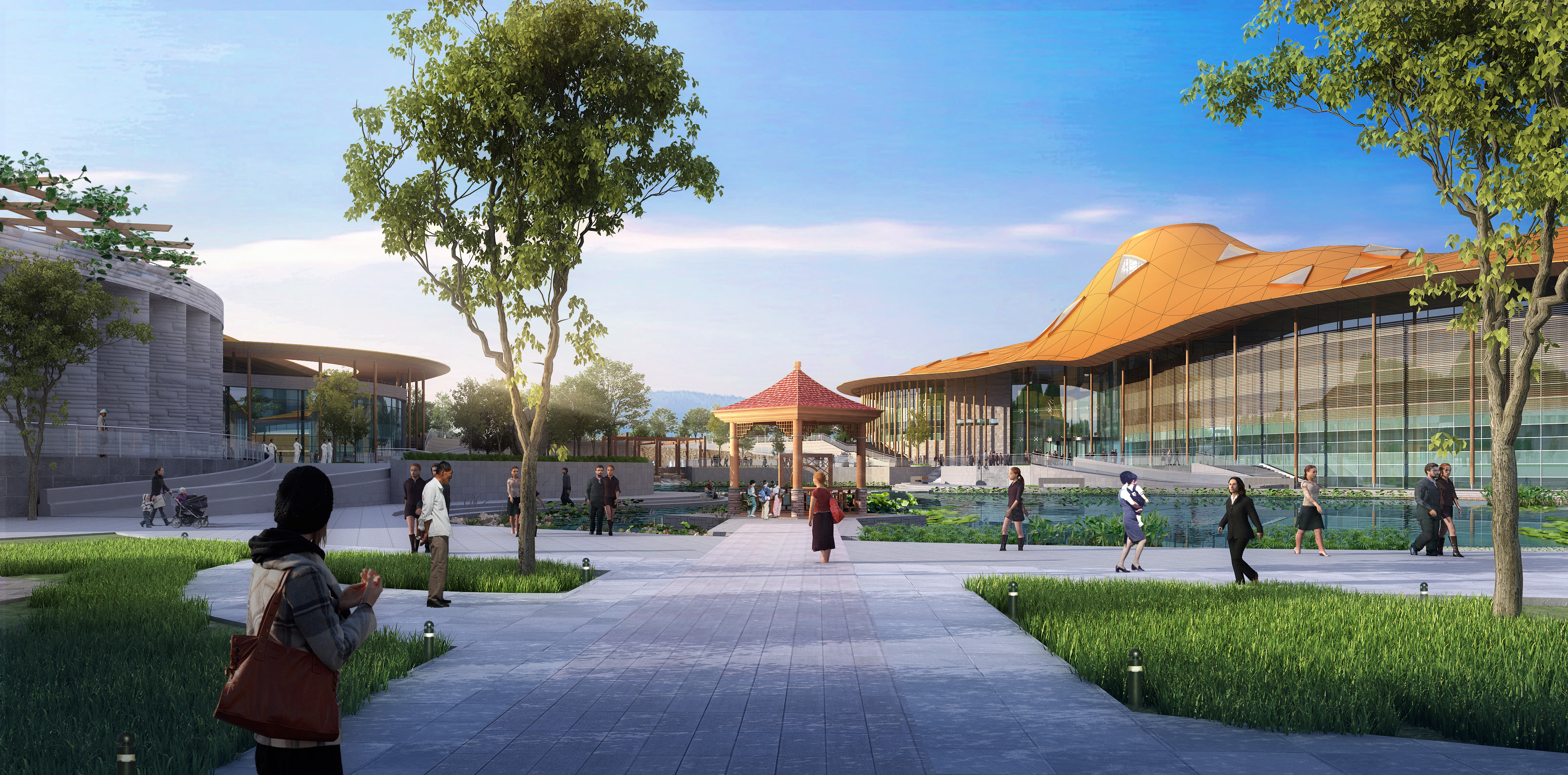
Zhuzhuo, China. The Zhuzhuo Activity Centre for Women, Children, Juveniles and Elder Persons. View over the fishing lake looking west. CGI image, December 2012

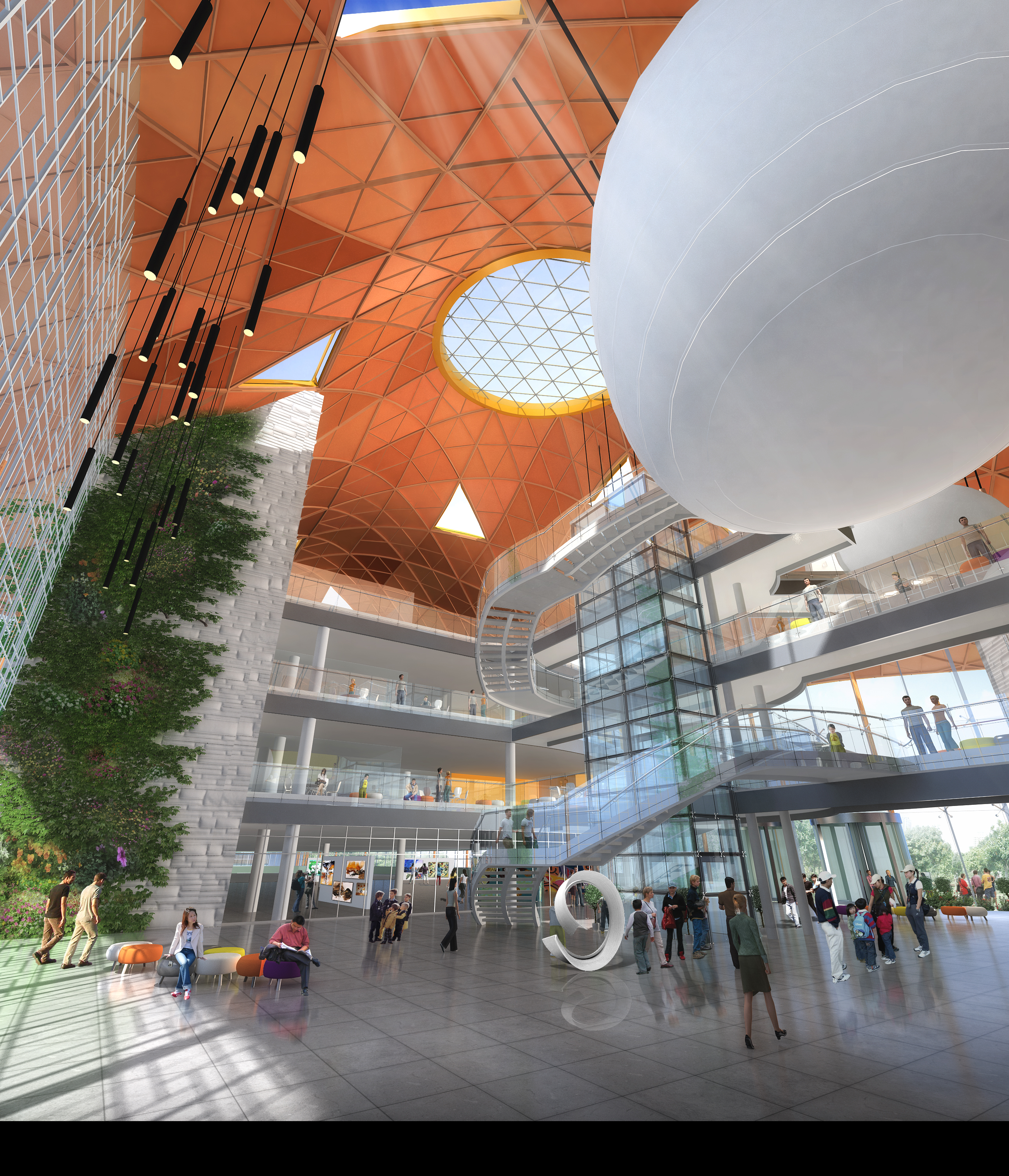
Zhuzhuo Activity Centre, China. The reception Foyer of the Activity Centre for Women, Children and Juveniles. CGI image, December 2012

Work in recent years has included major projects in all sectors from the first 'Excellent' rated BREEAM 50m swimming pool in the world; the one million sqft commercial office development at Quorum Business Park and a £35m higher education facility for Gateshead College. Work in the hospitality sector also continued with a £28m four star hotel for Radisson SAS, located next to Durham Cathedral, and the 260 bed hotel for Hilton in Gateshead adjacent to the Tyne Bridge.

Throughout his professional career, Smith has been responsible for the design and construction of over 15,000,000 square feet (1,400,000 m^{2}) of space including 4,000 homes; 6,000,000 square feet (560,000 m^{2}) of commercial offices; 2,500,000 square feet (230,000 m^{2}) of industrial and 3,000,000 square feet (280,000 m^{2}) of sport, leisure and hospitality.

In 2008 Smith handed over the £105m development of St George's Park National Football Centre to the English Football Association, creating England's first National Football Centre at Burton upon Trent. The development, completed on time and within budget will be home to all 24 of the England National Teams and a destination for the training of players, coaches, referees, and football administrators in a campus style development in the heart of the National Forest. Ultimately it will become a 'University of Football'.

In November 2012 redboxdesign group won the Best Professional Service Business Serving Football award at 2012 Football Business Awards.

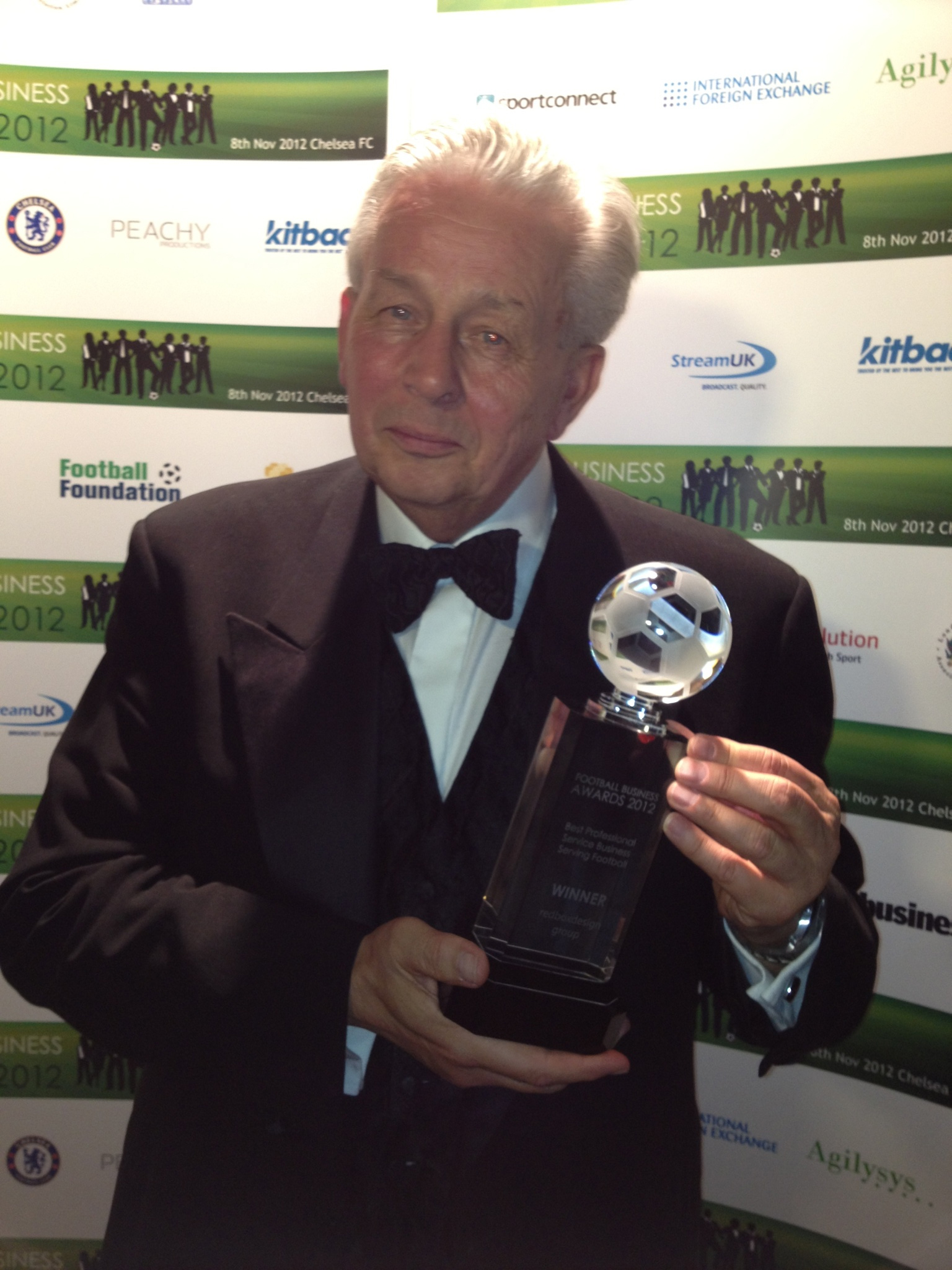
Alan J Smith with the Best Professional Service Business Serving Football in 2012 award

The scheme includes twelve pitches, a full-size indoor football pitch, an all-purpose indoor sports hall. Accommodation also includes a Hilton dual branded 230 bed hotel, with conferencing, banqueting, leisure club and spa; education facilities, lecture theatres and a sports science and sports medicine centre run by PERFORM a division of SPIRE.

==== Other projects ====
In addition to the National Football Centre, Smith has recently been involved in other projects:

- New and Renewable Energy Centre, (NaREC) along the riverside in Byth which will become the centre of the new off-shore wind turbine industry of the North East Coast of England.
- Schools at Brandon and Esh Winning in County Durham, opened this Easter and are the country's first schools classified as 'Outstanding' under BREEAM guidelines – achieving a 90 per cent reduction in carbon footprint compared to 2002 Building Regulations.
- Quorum Business Park, RICS Enterprise Award Winning scheme for over 1,000,000 sq ft (93,000 m^{2}) of high quality office space in landscaped masterplan.
- Sunderland A.F.C. training academy for the English Premiership club including a full size indoor pitch – the first in the UK to be granted planning permission in a green belt of the Great North Forest.
- Bolton Wanderers F. C. Master Plan on land surrounding stadium.
- Sandfields – 200 houses and apartments in Nottingham, for UKR, a new regeneration company set up by Jacke Sadek to fund private sector rented accommodation
- Two more Hilton branded hotels, one a Garden Inn and the other a Hampton by Hilton.
- New Sports and Performing Arts buildings for Sunderland College.
- A new three court basketball stadium for the Newcastle Eagles Community Foundation
- The Design Centre North in Gateshead has just been completed and provides an opportunity for emerging and nascent businesses involved in all aspects of the design industry.

In 2012, working with government officials, local design institutes and developers, redbox were involved in multimillion-pound projects in Hunan Province, particularly in the cities of Changsha, Zhuzhuo and the new town of Yunlong. Schemes included technology parks, office, commercial and heritage projects varying in size up to 5,000,000 square feet. Smith has been invited to become a visiting professor at the leading university in South West China, a post he will take up in September 2012.

Smith is also working with artists in Sichuan, where he is developing an agency to export works by nascent Chinese artists into the western art market, at the same time he intends to open a contemporary art gallery in Chongqing.

=== Outside of architecture ===
In 2010 he won a silver medal for his first ever garden design commissioned by Gateshead Borough Council and Great North Run at the Chelsea Flower Show.

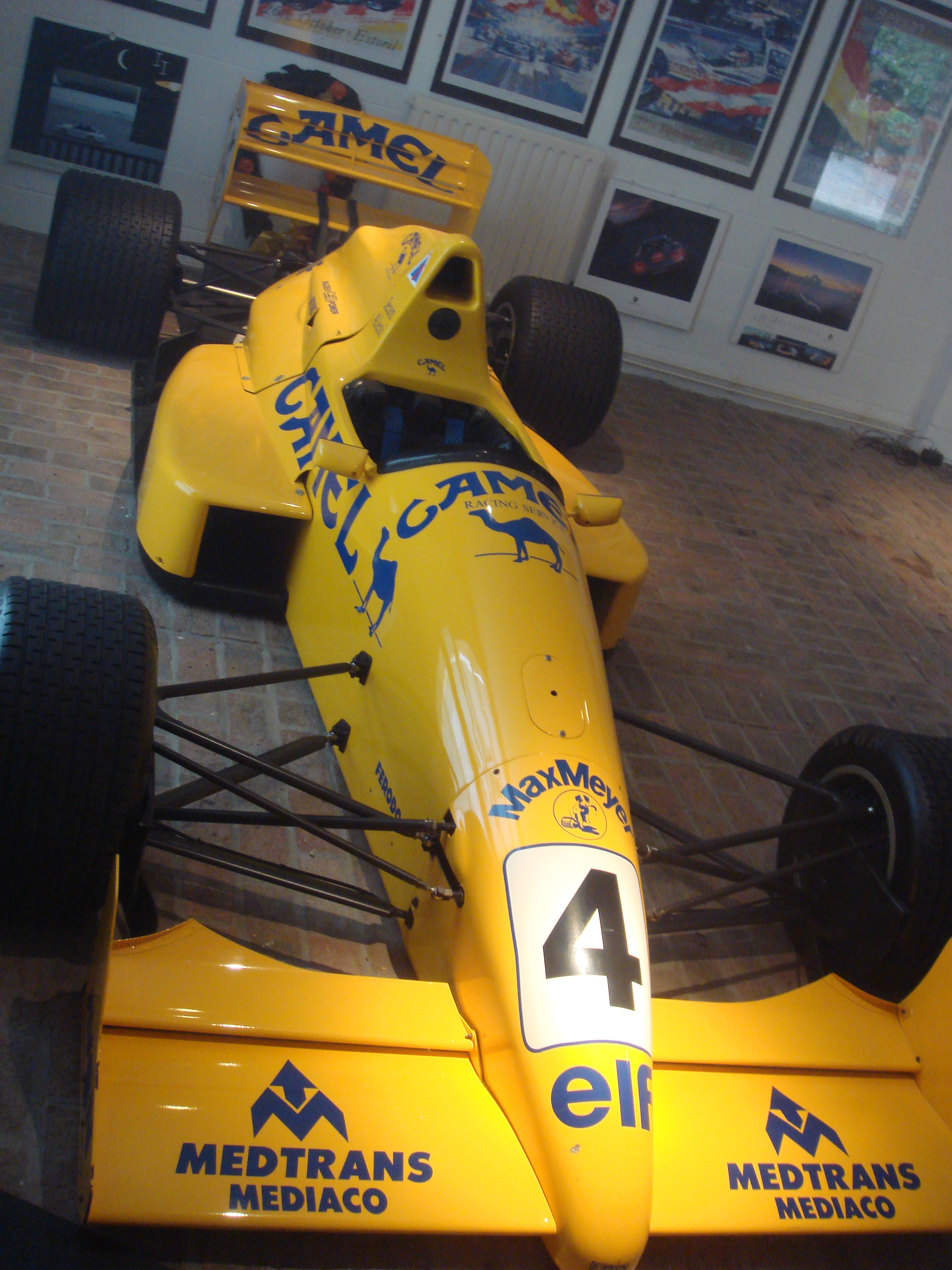
Jean Alesi Car, Team AJS

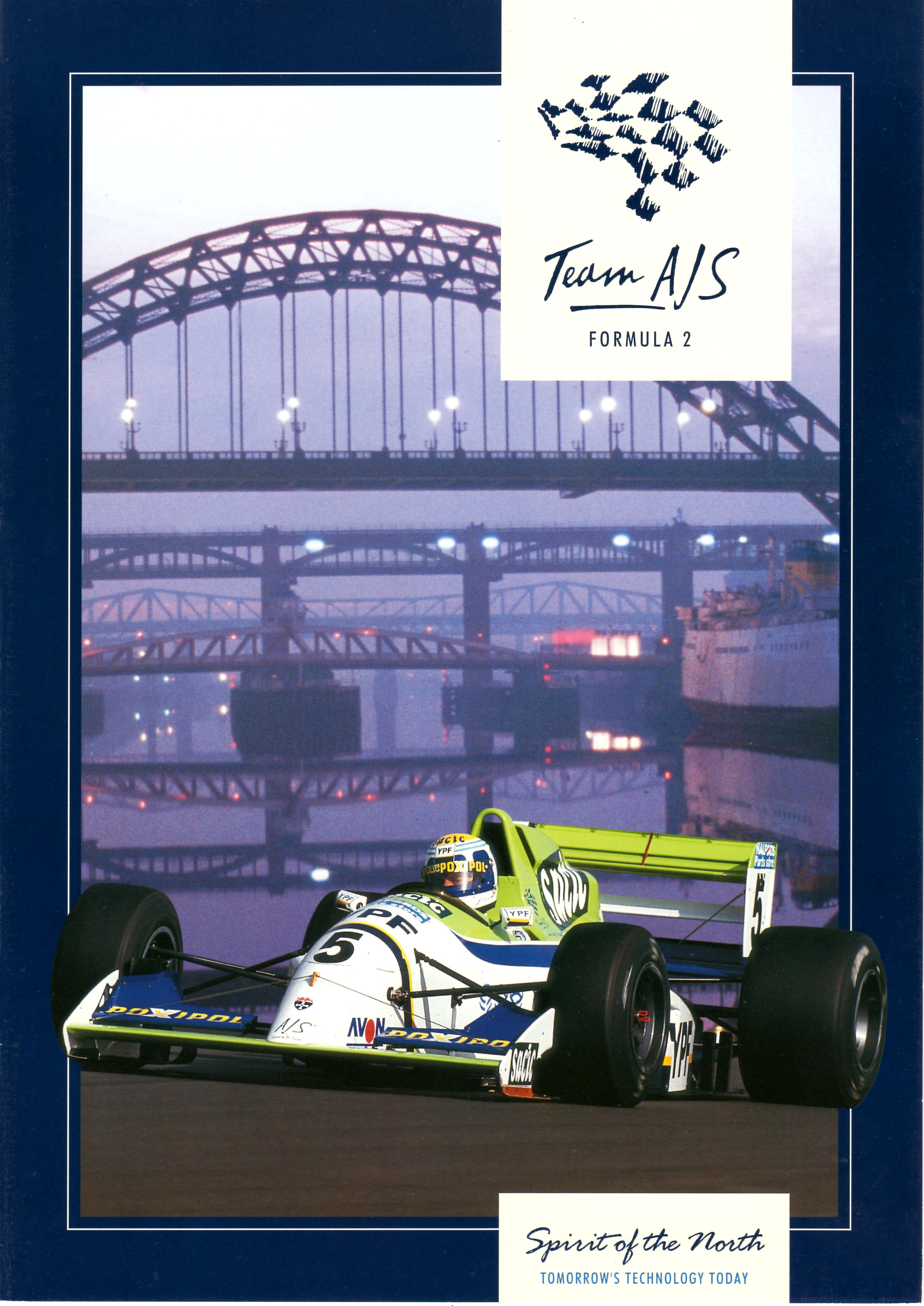
Spirit of the North

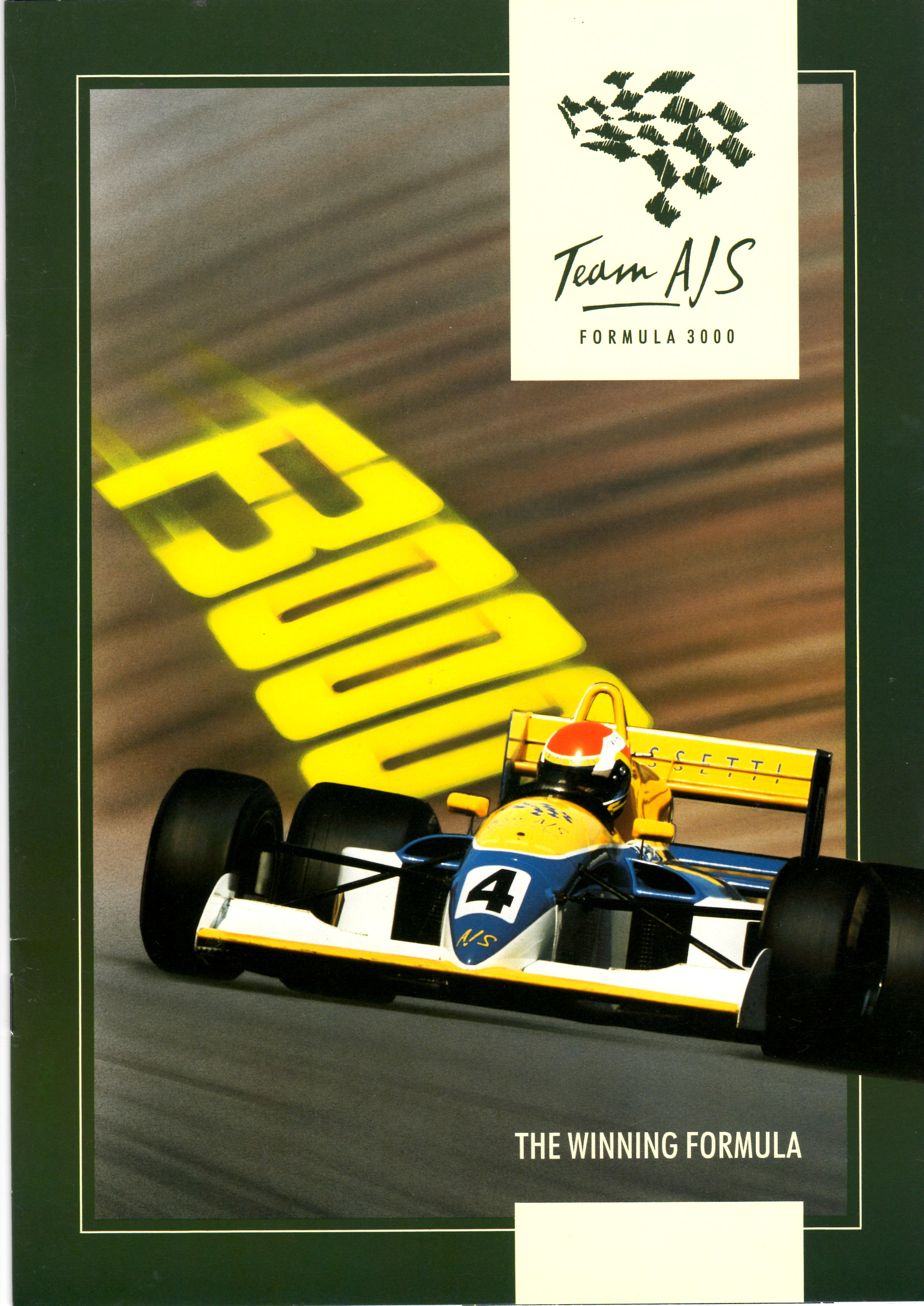
The Winning Formula

In 1989, encouraged by Eddie Jordan who in the late 80's dominated British motor sport and won the European Formula 3000 Championship, Smith entered the world of motor racing ownership and management founding TEAM AJS F3000, running with Ricard Rydell, a young Swedish driver, working with race engineer Paul Crosby (who had worked previously with both Jean Alesi and David Couthard). The team won at Brands Hatch, the first race they contested. Over a five-year period Smith's team enjoyed success with drivers from Sweden, Brazil, Argentina, Denmark, consistently winning races, 'fastest lap' and pole position records.

Smith spent five years on the Board of Northern Arts playing a key part in converting the landscape of North East England into an 'open air' gallery with works commissioned and installed throughout the region by major international artists such as Claes Oldenburg, Jaun Munoz, Antony Gormley and James Turrell.

Whilst at Northern Arts, he also helped to establish Commissions North, an agency for commissioning both private and public sector art works, securing works valued at over £1m in the first year.

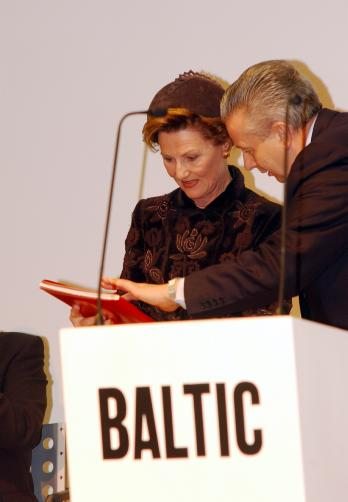
Smith and Queen Sonya of Norway

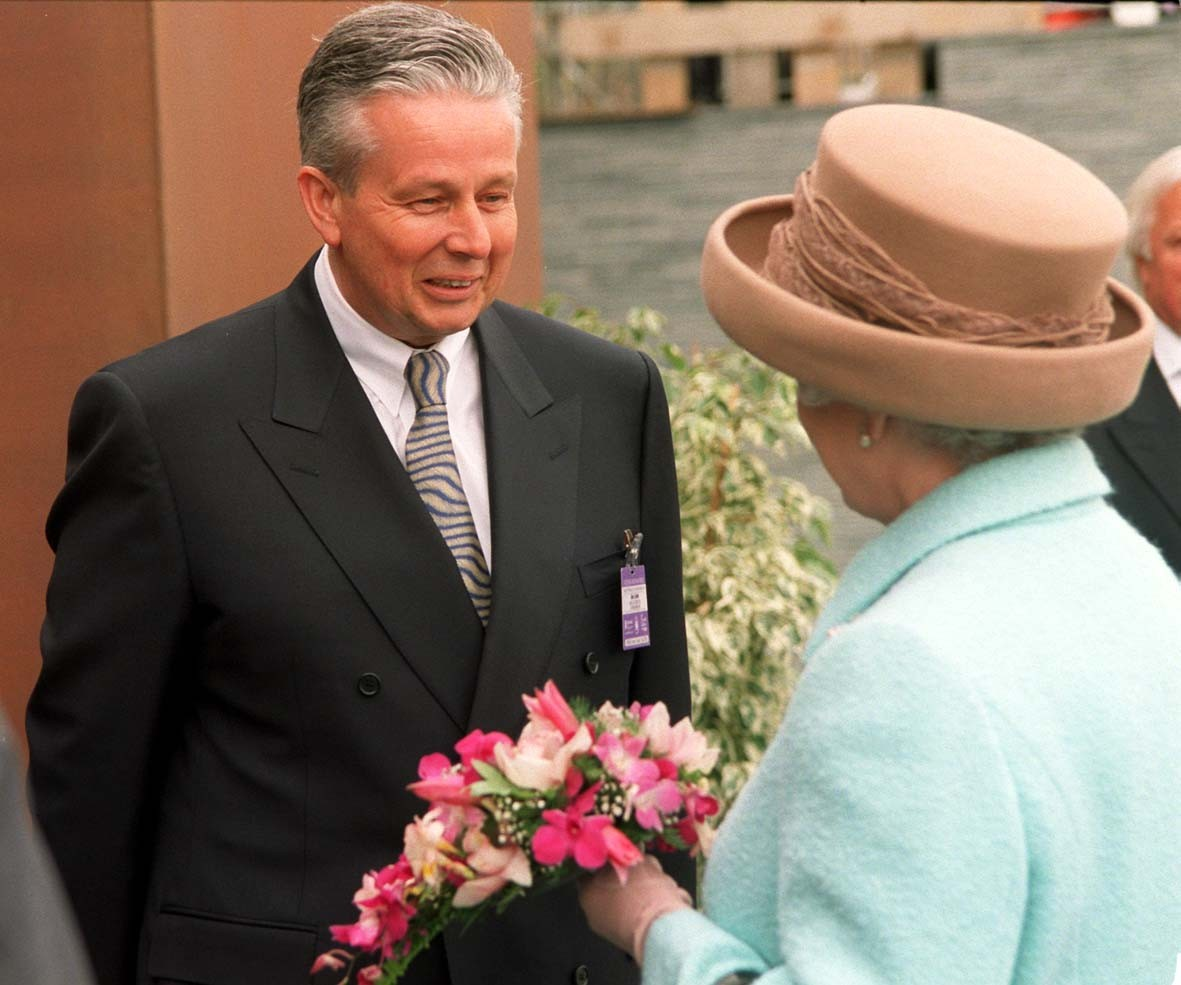
Smith and HM Queen Elizabeth II

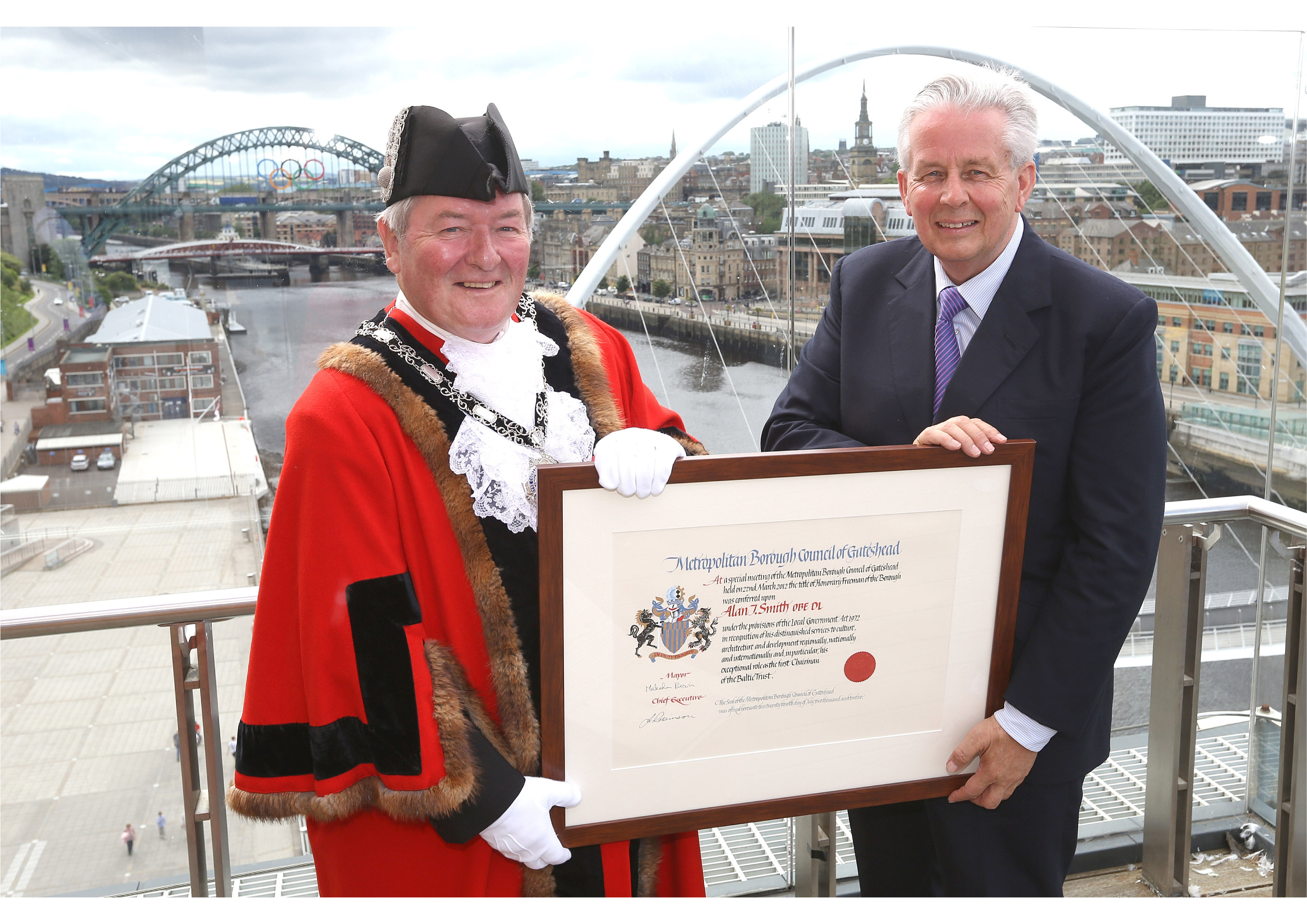
Alan J Smith Freedom of Gateshead July 2012

1998 saw him appointed chairman of the BALTIC Visual Arts Trust, tasked with delivering and establishing a £46m contemporary arts facility in Gateshead. Twice the size of the Hayward gallery, the project is the largest art space outside London and the largest arts lottery funded project in the UK. It was opened in 2002 by Her Majesty the Queen and attracted over one million visitors in the first year. Smith stood down in 2003 having consolidated the organisation, and BALTIC continues to be regarded as one of the finest contemporary arts spaces outside London, still attracting over 400,000 visitors a year.

Other notable charity roles see Smith on the boards of Great North Art Affair, Great North Culture Programme, Academy 360 and the Maggie's Centre for cancer care and support. Smith has also received much recognition for his active support of education through University and Grammar School Bursaries; primary and secondary school mentoring, as well significant financial donations to assist individual students from financially challenged backgrounds, especially those wishing to take up a career in the visual or applied arts.

Smith is a member of the Institute of Directors, the Reform Club and The Royal Automobile Club in London.

=== Recognition and honours ===
- 1992 Elected Fellow of the Chartered Society of Designers.
- 2006 Awarded an O.B.E., for services to architecture.
- 2008 Awarded Honorary Doctorate in Business Administration by Sunderland University.
- 2008 Appointed Deputy Lord Lieutenant of the County of Durham.
- 2011 Elected Fellow of the Royal Society, F.R.S.A.
- 2012 Awarded the Freedom of the Borough of Gateshead "In recognition of his distinguished services to culture, architecture and development, regionally, nationally and internationally and particular for his exceptional role as the first Chairman of the Baltic Trust". He is one of only 20 to receive such an honour since the borough was established in 1835.

=== Personal life ===
Smith married Ellen in 1972 and together they have one son, Elliot who was educated at Durham Chorister School, The Royal Grammar, Newcastle upon Tyne, and York University, where he read psychology. The family currently live on a small country estate on the outskirts of Durham City, and split their time between Durham and their other home in Chelsea.

Smith is a qualified pilot, plays the drums, sails, gardens and collects cars. He also mentors young emerging artists and designers.
