= Allan Smith (New Zealand footballer) =

New Zealand footballer

Personal information
- Full name: W. Allan A Smith
- Place of birth: New Zealand
- Position: Forward

Senior career*
Years	Team	Apps	(Gls)
- Nelson Thistle

International career
1954	New Zealand	2	(1)
- * Club domestic league appearances and goals

W. Allan Smith is a former football (soccer) player who represented New Zealand at international level.

Smith played two official A-international matches for New Zealand in 1954, both 1-4 losses against trans-Tasman neighbours Australia, the first on 4 September in which Smith scored New Zealand's goal, the second on 9 September, Charlie Steele, Jr. the scorer on that occasion.
