= Alfred Smith (cricketer, born 1847) =

English cricketer

Personal information
- Full name: Alfred Farrer Smith
- Born: 7 March 1847; Birstall, Yorkshire, England
- Died: 6 January 1915 (aged 67); Ossett, Yorkshire, England
- Batting: Right-handed
- Bowling: Right-arm roundarm fast-medium

Domestic team information
- Years: Team
- 1868–1874: Yorkshire

Umpiring information
- FC umpired: 134 (1892–1901)

Career statistics
Competition	First-class
Matches	29
Runs scored	796
Batting average	16.93
100s/50s	–/3
Top score	99
Catches/stumpings	10/–
- Source: Cricinfo, 1 February 2024

Alfred Farrer Smith (7 March 1847 – 6 January 1915) was an English first-class cricketer, who played twenty eight matches for Yorkshire County Cricket Club from 1868 to 1874, and one game for the Players of the North in 1874.

Born in Birstall, Yorkshire, England, Smith was a right-handed batsman, who scored 796 runs at 16.93. He never made a first-class century, but came close with an innings of 99 against the Gentlemen of the South. He scored three half centuries in all, including 89 against Nottinghamshire and 51 against Middlesex, and took eleven catches in the field. His right arm fast medium round arm bowling was not called upon in first-class games.

Smith died on 6 January 1915 in Ossett, Yorkshire.
