= Alan Smith (footballer, born 1950) =

English footballer

Personal information
- Full name: Alan Michael Smith
- Date of birth: 1 September 1950 (age 76)
- Place of birth: Harrogate, West Riding of Yorkshire, England
- Height: 5 ft 9 in (1.75 m)
- Position: Winger

Senior career*
Years	Team	Apps	(Gls)
- Harrogate Railway Athletic
1970–1971	York City	2	(0)
1971–	Bradford Park Avenue		
- Bridlington Town
- Ossett Albion
1979–????	Harrogate Town		

Managerial career
- 1979–????: Harrogate Town
- 1994–????: Harrogate Town
- * Club domestic league appearances and goals

Alan Michael Smith (born 1 September 1950) is an English former amateur footballer who played as a winger in the Football League for York City, and in non-League football for Harrogate Railway Athletic, Bradford Park Avenue, Bridlington Town, Ossett Albion and Harrogate Town. He joined Harrogate as player-manager in 1979, before retiring from playing in 1984. He served as general manager from 1990 to 1991 before taking as team manager again in 1994.
