= J. Alfred Smith =

American pastor (1931–2025)

J. Alfred Smith Sr.
- Born: May 19, 1931; Kansas City, Missouri, U.S.
- Died: September 19, 2025 (aged 94)
- Education: Western Baptist College (BS); University of Missouri (BD); American Baptist College (MA); Golden Gate Baptist Theological Seminary (D.Min)

James Alfred Smith Sr. (May 19, 1931 – September 19, 2025) was an American pastor of the Allen Temple Baptist Church in Oakland, California.

Ebony Magazine chose Smith to be one of the "Most Influential Black Americans" and was one of the magazine's Top 15 Greatest Black Preachers of 1993.

He was recognized with various honors, including receiving the Lifetime Achievement Award from the Greenling Institute.

== Early life ==
Smith was born in Kansas City, Missouri, on May 19, 1931, to Amy Gates Smith and Clyde Anderson. He graduated from Kansas City's R.T. Coles High School in 1948 and obtained a license to preach that same year. He married JoAnna Goodwin in 1950 and began as a student pastor at Mount Washington Baptist Church in Parkville, Missouri, in 1951.

== Education ==
Smith earned a B.S. degree from Western Baptist College (now Corban University) in elementary education in 1952. In 1959, he earned a bachelor's degree in divinity from the University of Missouri, and in 1966 he earned a master's degree in Theology, Church, and Community.

In 1972, he received a master's degree from the American Baptist Seminary in American Church History. In 1975, Smith received a Doctor of Ministry Degree from the Golden Gate Baptist Theological Seminary.

== Career ==
During the 1960s, Smith worked at the American Baptist Convention Staff of Northern California, Bishop College in Dallas, American Baptist Churches of the West. He also taught at Laney College, Merritt College, Patton College and Concordia College, all in Oakland, California. Smith was named Senior Pastor of Oakland, California's Allen Temple Baptist Church in 1971.

In 1979 he became the first vice-president of the Progressive Baptist State Convention of California. He was elected president two years later.

In 1989, he testified before the United Nations against South Africa’s apartheid regime, calling for freedom and justice.

In 1984 he became the first vice-president of Progressive National Baptist Convention, and became president in 1986.

He was the Founder and Chancellor (1989–2011) of the Leadership Institute at Allen Temple.

In 1992 he joined the American Baptist Seminary of the West (now Berkeley School of Theology) as Professor of Preaching and Church Ministries. Upon his retirement, he was named Professor Emeritus of Preaching and Church Ministries.

In 2004, he lectured at the Oxford University Round Table.

In 2005, he keynoted the Baylor University Conference on Black Preaching.

In 2007, he preached in Cambridge, England, at St. Andrew’s Baptist Church on “A Changeless Christ in a Changing World.”

He retired from the Allen Temple Baptist Church in 2009 and was succeeded by his son, Rev. Dr. James Alfred Smith Jr.

In 2012, he became the first chair of the Council of Elders for Oblate School of Theology's Sankofa Institute for African American Pastoral Leadership in San Antonio, Texas.

Smith had a lengthy and rich career as a Visiting Professor and Doctoral Advisor including:

- Visiting Professor and Doctoral Advisor, Fuller Theological Seminary (Pasadena, California)
- Interdenominational Theological Center (Atlanta, Georgia); United Theological Seminary (Dayton, Ohio)
- Visiting Professor, Southern Baptist Seminary, Louisville, Kentucky
- Adjunct Professor, Garrett Theological Seminary, Evanston, Illinois
- Scholar in Residence, Gardner-Webb University, Boiling Springs, North Carolina (2009)

== Personal life and death ==
Smith's first wife, JoAnna Goodwin Smith, died in 2007. To this union five children were born. He later married Reverend Bernestine Smith.

Smith’s affiliations included being a member of Alpha Phi Alpha fraternity, a 33rd Degree Prince Hall Mason, and a member of the Academy of Homiletics.

His son, J. Alfred Smith Jr., now retired, was a Senior Pastor of the Allen Temple Baptist Church.

Smith died on September 19, 2025, at the age of 94.

== Honors ==
Smith was named by Ebony Magazine as one of the Most Influential Black Americans for two years consecutively. He was also named Outstanding Citizen of the Year by the Oakland Tribune in 1990. He was awarded the Lifetime Achievement Award by the Greenling Institute in 2001 and was named Humanitarian of the Year by the East Bay Agency for Children.

Smith was also named a Samuel DeWitt Proctor Conference Beautiful Are Their Feet Honoree in 2006.

Among the numerous awards he received include the Agape Award from Shiloh Baptist Church (Washington, D.C.), and the Gandhi Ikeda Award from Morehouse College.

Upon his retirement from Berkeley School of Theology, the J. Alfred Smith Sr. Endowed Chair of Theology in the Public Square was created in his honor.

== Works ==
Smith wrote an autobiography, On the Jericho Road (2004). He is also the author of 15 other books including Speak Until Justice Wakes (2006), The Overflowing Heart (1987), and Preach On (1996).
