= Alfred Baker Smith =

Alfred Baker Smith (November 17, 1825 – January 28, 1896) was an American Union brevet brigadier general during the period of the American Civil War. He received his appointment as brevet brigadier general dated to March 13, 1865.

During the Battle of Gettysburg, Smith served as a major with the 150th New York Volunteer Infantry Regiment. Smith had been promoted to the rank of major on October 11, 1862. He was later promoted to the rank of lieutenant colonel on January 1, 1865, and served as a colonel from April 1, 1865 until June 8, 1865. On January 28, 1896, the former soldier and lawyer died at a prayer meeting from an apparent heart attack.

== See also ==
- List of American Civil War brevet generals (Union)
