= Alan Smith (physiotherapist) =

English physiotherapist (died 2023)

Alan Smith (1948/1949 – May 2023) was an English physiotherapist, who was the England national football team's full-time physiotherapist for eight years and Sheffield Wednesday's for eleven.

== Career ==
Smith began his career as an apprentice footballer with his home town club, Middlesbrough, but a broken leg at just 17 years old meant that he had to retire. Determined to stay in the game, he trained as a physiotherapist, earning his first appointment at Rotherham United in 1972. After five years at Rotherham he moved on to Blackpool, where he stayed for six years. In 1983, he was appointed physiotherapist at Sheffield Wednesday, remaining with the club for eleven years, from the Football League Second Division to the Premier League and European competition. He first worked with the England national football team in 1986, and in 1994 Terry Venables appointed him as England's physiotherapist on a full-time basis, a post which he held for eight years, working under seven different managers. He also worked for Blackburn Rovers on a part-time basis. He renewed his association with Sheffield Wednesday in 2009 in the role of part-time consultant physiotherapist.

Smith's son Paul, also a chartered physiotherapist, joined Sheffield Wednesday in April 2009.

Sir Bobby Robson, who first employed Smith for England, selected him as physio to the England team taking part in the 2009 charity match in aid of the Sir Bobby Robson Foundation.

On 28 May 2023, it was announced that Smith had died at the age of 74.
