= Alfred E. Smith IV =

American businessman (1951–2019)

Alfred Emanuel Smith IV (May 24, 1951 – November 20, 2019) was an American Wall Street executive who was a senior advisor for the Marwood Group, and sat on many volunteer and charitable boards, including the Tony Blair Faith Foundation, and Mutual of America. He also served as chairman of the board of Saint Vincent's Catholic Medical Center.

== Personal life ==
Smith was born on May 24, 1951, in Brooklyn, in New York City. He was the great-grandson of Al Smith (1873–1944), Governor of New York. He attended Iona Preparatory School and Villanova University. Smith was married to Nan Moore Smith. They had two children, Alfred Emanuel Smith V and Catherine Smith Totero, and six grandchildren. Smith grew up in Rye, New York. He died at his home in New Canaan, Connecticut.

== Career ==
Smith began his Wall Street career as an independent floor broker of the New York Stock Exchange. In 1975, he relocated to Chicago to join Mitchell Hutchins, where he served as vice president until 1979 when he returned to New York and was named partner of CMJ Partners. In 1997, he joined Bear Wagner as managing director.

Smith served as the director, secretary, and dinner chairman for the Alfred E. Smith Memorial Foundation, as well as master of ceremonies at the annual Alfred E. Smith Memorial Foundation Dinner.

In December 2006, after 35 years on Wall Street, he retired from his position as managing director of Bear Wagner Specialists LLC, a specialist and member firm of the New York Stock Exchange.

=== Nonprofit work ===
Smith's work on behalf of charities in New York and Connecticut was extensive. In addition to his work with the Alfred E. Smith Memorial Foundation, he was a founding member and serves as chairman of the Ireland Chamber of Commerce of the USA, director of the Center for Hope, former trustee of Calvary Hospital and served on the board of Saint Vincent's Hospital in Manhattan from 1986 until its closure in April 2010. Smith and other members of the Saint Vincent's board were criticized by community leaders in 2010 in connection with the closure and bankruptcy of Saint Vincent's. A lawsuit is pending in connection with the alleged mismanagement of the hospital. Smith was the chairman of Hackers for Hope, an organization he co-founded in 1988 to raise money for cancer research and treatment. Since its first "tournament" in 1988, Hackers for Hope had donated a total of more than $8,000,000 to Saint Vincent's Catholic Medical Centers Comprehensive Cancer Center, Memorial Sloan Kettering Cancer Center and other organizations committed to finding a cure for and treating cancer. Smith's work with Saint Vincent's Medical Centers was rooted in his family history with Saint Vincent's, which extended back 70 years to when his great-grandfather was involved in St. Vincent's. In his role as chairman, Smith's focus was on building a new state of the art hospital that would continue to tackle the healthcare needs of the New York community. However, the hospital filed for bankruptcy and closed in the spring of 2010.

Smith served as president of the Society of the Friendly Sons of St. Patrick in New York, from 2005 until 2007, and as the president of Kappa Beta Phil.

== Honors and awards ==
Over the years, Smith received numerous honors and awards. Accolades awarded to Smith include:

- Knight of Malta
- Ellis Island Medal of Honor (1994)
- American Cancer Society "Gold Sword of Hope Award" (1993)
- Our Lady of Mercy Medical Center "Terence Cardinal Cooke Humanitarian Award" (1993)
- National Conference of Christians and Jews "National Brotherhood Award" (1994)
- Catholic Youth Organization "Club of Champions Gold Medal Award" (1994)
- Pregnancy Care Center "Humanitarian Award" (1995)
- Iona Preparatory School "Man of the Year" (1996)
- Boy Scouts of America "Good Scout of the Year" (1998)
- Terence Cardinal Cooke Health Care Center "Partnership Award" (1999)
- Ireland Chamber of Commerce of the USA's "Man of the Year" (2000)
- St. James School's "Man of the Year" (2003)
- United Hospital Fund honoree (2004)
- Saint Vincent's Hospital Angelus Award (2005)
