= Alfred Leo Smith =

Native American drug and alcohol counselor and activist (1919–2014)

Alfred Leo Smith (November 6, 1919 – November 19, 2014) was a Klamath Nation drug and alcohol counselor and Native American activist from Oregon.

== Early life ==
Smith was born on November 6, 1919, in Modoc Point, Oregon. He spent his early childhood on the Williamson River.

At age seven, Smith was sent to a nearby Catholic boarding school at the insistence of local Indian agents. He was ultimately sent to a mix of Catholic schools and Bureau of Indian Affairs schools, as far away as Beaverton, Oregon, and Stewart Indian School in Nevada. After leaving Chemawa Indian School, he began to live in Portland, Oregon, as an alcoholic panhandler. He was drafted during World War II and was sent to federal prison for drinking on duty. He survived a bout of tuberculosis, and experienced the 1942 death of his sister and 1950 death of his mother. The United States Congress voted to terminate the Klamath Nation in 1954, striking another blow against Smith.

In 1957, Smith became sober with the help of an Alcoholics Anonymous program, ultimately celebrating 56 years of sobriety. He also became interested in Native recovery through culturally relevant practices and indigenous spirituality.

== Professional life ==
Smith began working for the Portland Alcoholism Counseling and Recovery Program, helping alcoholics in a community he knew well. In 1972, the Bureau of Indian Affairs hired Smith to set up a number of tribal treatment programs across the United States. He also worked in the Klamath Basin on drug and alcohol recovery issues, where he was able to reconnect with his heritage and culture.

In 1972, Al Smith began to work at Sweathouse Lodge, part of the Chicano-Indian Study Center of Oregon founded on the site of Camp Adair. His position as treatment coordinator allowed him to combine AA principles with traditional Native spiritual practices, particularly the daily sweat lodge ceremony.

== Employment Division v. Smith ==
In 1982, Smith began working at a nonprofit Drug and Alcohol counseling program in Roseburg, Oregon. After his colleague Galen Black was fired for ingesting peyote, Smith indignantly attended a ceremony of the Native American Church, declaring "You can't tell me that I can't go to church!".

Smith was fired for using peyote as part of the ceremony. At the time, intentional possession of peyote was a crime under Oregon law without an affirmative defense for religious use. The counselors filed a claim for unemployment compensation with the state, but the claim was denied because the reason for their dismissal was deemed work-related "misconduct." The Oregon Court of Appeals reversed that ruling, holding that denying them unemployment benefits for their religious use of peyote violated their right to exercise their religion. The Oregon Supreme Court agreed, although it relied not on the fact that peyote use was a crime but on the fact that the state's justification for withholding the benefits—preserving the "financial integrity" of the workers' compensation fund—was outweighed by the burden imposed on the employees' exercise of their religion. The state appealed to the U.S. Supreme Court, again arguing that denying the unemployment benefits was proper because possession of peyote was a crime.

The U.S. Supreme Court let stand the Oregon Supreme Court's judgment against the two employees and returned the case to the Oregon courts to determine whether or not sacramental use of illegal drugs violated Oregon's state drug laws (485 U.S. 660 (1988)). Writing for the majority, Antonin Scalia declared that the free exercise of religion did not protect minority religions from "neutral, generally applicable laws." Scalia believed that "...[l]eaving accommodation to the political process will place at a relative disadvantage those religious practices that are not widely engaged in, but that unavoidable consequence of democratic government must be preferred to a system in which each conscience is a law unto itself or in which judges weigh the social importance of all laws against the centrality of all religious beliefs."
