= List of shipwrecks in 1801 =

The list of shipwrecks in 1801 includes ships sunk, foundered, wrecked, grounded, or otherwise lost during 1801.

table of contents
1801
| Jan | Feb | Mar | Apr |
| May | Jun | Jul | Aug |
| Sep | Oct | Nov | Dec |
Unknown date

== January ==
=== 1 January ===
List of shipwrecks: 1 January 1801
| Ship | State | Description |
|---|---|---|
| Farmer's Delight | United Kingdom | The sloop was driven ashore and wrecked at Newhaven, Sussex, while on a voyage from Cowes, Isle of Wight, to London. Her crew were rescued. |
| Unnamed | Flag unknown | The ship foundered off Eastbourne, Sussex with the loss of all hands. |

=== 2 January ===
List of shipwrecks: 2 January 1801
| Ship | State | Description |
|---|---|---|
| Betsey | United Kingdom | The ship was wrecked on the Cockle Sand, in the North Sea off the coast of Norfolk. She was on a voyage from Great Yarmouth, Norfolk, to Newcastle-upon-Tyne, Northumberland. |
| George Washington | United States | The ship was wrecked on Texel, North Holland, Batavian Republic, while on a voyage from Baltimore, Maryland, to Amsterdam, North Holland. |

=== 4 January ===
List of shipwrecks: 4 January 1801
| Ship | State | Description |
|---|---|---|
| Concert | United Kingdom | The brig was wrecked near Dingle, County Kerry, while on a voyage from Demerara to Liverpool, Lancashire. |
| Nancy | United Kingdom | The sloop foundered in the North Sea off St. Abb's Head, Berwickshire, while on a voyage from Newcastle-upon-Tyne to "Warren". Her crew were rescued. |
| Neptune | United Kingdom | The ship foundered while on a voyage from London to Portsmouth, Hampshire. |
| Rodney | United Kingdom | The ship foundered while on a voyage from London to Portsmouth. |

=== 5 January ===
List of shipwrecks: 5 January 1801
| Ship | State | Description |
|---|---|---|
| Dictator | United Kingdom | The West Indiaman was wrecked in Dingle Bay with the loss of all but three of the 60 people on board. She was on a voyage from Demerara to Liverpool, Lancashire, the return leg of her maiden voyage. |
| Glasgow | United Kingdom | The brig was driven ashore and wrecked on Canna, Inner Hebrides while on a voyage from Danzig to Londonderry. |
| Light Horse | United States | The snow was driven ashore and wrecked on Preston Sands, Dumfriesshire, United Kingdom. She was on a voyage from Baltimore, Maryland, to Bremen. Her crew survived. |

=== 7 January ===
List of shipwrecks: 7 January 1801
| Ship | State | Description |
|---|---|---|
| Aid | United Kingdom | The brigantine was wrecked on the Sussex coast. Her crew were rescued. |
| Elizabeth | Denmark | The ship was wrecked on the Fleshings, off Whalsay, Shetland Islands, United Kingdom, with the loss of all on board. She was on a voyage from Copenhagen to Saint Thomas and Saint Croix. |
| Famous Delight | United Kingdom | The sloop was wrecked on the Sussex coast. |
| Unnamed | Flag unknown | The ship foundered in the English Channell off Eastbourne, Sussex with the loss of all hands. |

=== 8 January ===
List of shipwrecks: 8 January 1801
| Ship | State | Description |
|---|---|---|
| Lark | United Kingdom | War of the Second Coalition: The ship was captured by the privateer Bougainville (France) in the Atlantic Ocean off Land's End, Cornwall. She sprang a leak and was abandoned by her crew. Lark was on a voyage from King's Lynn, Norfolk, to Liverpool, Lancashire. |

=== 14 January ===
List of shipwrecks: 14 January 1801
| Ship | State | Description |
|---|---|---|
| Neptune | United Kingdom | The sloop foundered in the English Channel off Brighton, Sussex, with the loss of all hands. |

=== 17 January ===
List of shipwrecks: 17 January 1801
| Ship | State | Description |
|---|---|---|
| Agnes and Edmund | United Kingdom | The ship was wrecked at Viana do Castelo, Portugal, while on a voyage from Cork to Lisbon, Portugal. Her crew were rescued. |
| Eliza | Denmark | The vessel was wrecked on a reef off the island of Saona, Hispanola. On 19 January, 60 women and children, and seven crewmen were rescued by USS Experiment (United States Navy) shortly before the vessel broke up and sank. |

=== 19 January ===
List of shipwrecks: 19 January 1801
| Ship | State | Description |
|---|---|---|
| Sally | United Kingdom | The ship was wrecked on Lewis, Outer Hebrides. She was on a voyage from Charleston, South Carolina, united States to Greenock, Renfrewshire |

=== 23 January ===
List of shipwrecks: 23 January 1801
| Ship | State | Description |
|---|---|---|
| Lively | United Kingdom | The schooner was driven ashore at Great Orme, Caernarfonshire, with the loss of all but her captain. She was on a voyage from Halifax, Nova Scotia, British North America, to Liverpool, Lancashire. |
| Martha Brae | United Kingdom | The ship ran aground at Cork. She was on a voyage from Bristol, Gloucestershire to Lisbon, Portugal. |
| Peggy | United Kingdom | The ship ran aground at Cork. She was on a voyage from Glasgow, Renfrewshire to Demerara. |
| Robert | United Kingdom | The ship ran aground at Cork. She was on a voyage from Lancaster, Lancashire to Jamaica. |
| Susannah | United Kingdom | The ship ran aground at Cork. She was on a voyage from Liverpool to Jamaica. |
| Union | United Kingdom | The ship ran aground at Cork. She was on a voyage from Bristol to Jamaica. |

=== 25 January ===
List of shipwrecks: 25 January 1801
| Ship | State | Description |
|---|---|---|
| Rosannah | United Kingdom | The ship foundered in the English Channel off The Lizard, Cornwall, while on a voyage from Cork to London. Her crew were rescued. |

=== 26 January ===
List of shipwrecks: 26 January 1801
| Ship | State | Description |
|---|---|---|
| Milford | United Kingdom | The ship foundered off Milford Haven, Pembrokeshire, while on a voyage from that port to London. Her crew were rescued. |
| Unnamed | United Kingdom | The sloop foundered off Falmouth, Cornwall. Her crew were rescued. She was on a voyage from Cardiff, Glamorgan to London. |

=== 28 January ===
List of shipwrecks: 28 January 1801
| Ship | State | Description |
|---|---|---|
| Juffrow Henrietta | Batavian Republic | The ship was wrecked at Callantsoog, North Holland. Her crew were rescued. She was on a voyage from London, United Kingdom, to Amsterdam. |

=== 29 January ===
List of shipwrecks: 29 January 1801
| Ship | State | Description |
|---|---|---|
| La Curieuse | French Navy | War of the Second Coalition: The corvette was captured on 28 January by HMS Bordelais (Royal Navy) off Barbados but foundered due to damage received in the battle to capture her. Seven crew of HMS Bourdelois were lost when La Curieuse sank. |
| HMS Forte | Royal Navy | The frigate was wrecked near Jeddah, Ottoman Empire. |
| HMS Incendiary | Royal Navy | War of the Second Coalition: The fireship was captured by the 80-gun ship of the line Indivisible (French Navy) in the Gulf of Cádiz and scuttled. |

=== Unknown date ===
List of shipwrecks: Unknown date in January 1801
| Ship | State | Description |
|---|---|---|
| Active | United Kingdom | The ship was driven ashore in the River Mersey at Liverpool, Lancashire. She was on a voyage from the Bahamas to Liverpool. |
| Annabella | United Kingdom | War of the Second Coalition: The ship was captured by a French privateer and was subsequently driven ashore near Brest, Finistère, France. She was on a voyage from Saint Kitts to London. |
| Apollo | Danzig | The ship was wrecked on the Whiting Sand, in the North Sea off the coast of Essex, United Kingdom. She was on a voyage from Danzig to London. |
| Betsey | United Kingdom | The ship foundered in the English Channel off Dover, Kent. |
| Brilliant | United Kingdom | The ship foundered off Wexford while on a voyage from Dublin to Wexford. |
| Catharina | Hamburg | The ship was wrecked at Boulogne, Pas-de-Calais, France while on a voyage from St. Thomas, Virgin Islands to Altona. |
| Ceres | United Kingdom | The ship was driven ashore and wrecked in the River Mersey at Liverpool. She was on a voyage from Naples, Kingdom of Sicily, to Liverpool. |
| Convert | United Kingdom | The ship was wrecked near Dingle, County Kerry. She was on a voyage from Demerara to Liverpool. |
| Dasher | United Kingdom | War of the Second Coalition: The privateer foundered in the West Indies with the loss of all hands following an action with a Spanish schooner. |
| Endeavour | United Kingdom | The ship was driven ashore in Holyhead Bay. She was on a voyage from Ross to Liverpool. |
| Esther | United Kingdom | The ship was driven ashore. She was on a voyage from Wismar to Liverpool. She was refloated and put in to Arendal, Norway. |
| Eve | United Kingdom | The ship was driven ashore at Carlingford, County Louth, while on a voyage from Dublin to Newry, County Down. |
| Fletcher | United Kingdom | The ship was driven ashore and wrecked in the River Mersey at Liverpool. She was on a voyage from Martinique to Liverpool. |
| George | United Kingdom | The ship was wrecked at Fishguard, Pembrokeshire, while on a voyage from Waterford to Liverpool, Lancashire. |
| Hannah | United Kingdom | The ship was captured by a French privateer while Hannah was on a voyage from Bristol, Gloucestershire, to Newfoundland, British North America. She was set afire and sunk. |
| Hercules | United Kingdom | The ship foundered in the Atlantic Ocean while on a voyage from Newfoundland to a British port. Her crew were rescued by Virginia (United States). |
| Hero | United Kingdom | The ship was wrecked at Irvine, Ayrshire, while on a voyage from Saint Kitts to Glasgow, Renfrewshire. |
| Huntingdon | United Kingdom | The ship was wrecked in the Solway Firth while on a voyage from Liverpool to Africa. |
| John | United Kingdom | The ship was driven ashore in Loch Indaal. She was on a voyage from Dublin to Sligo. |
| John & Mary | United Kingdom | War of the Second Coalition: The ship was captured and subsequently lost on the Just Reef. She was on a voyage from Gothenburg, Sweden, to London. |
| Juffrow Anna | Prussia | The ship was driven ashore and wrecked at Elsinore, Denmark. She was on a voyage from Memel to London. |
| Justina | United Kingdom | The ship was wrecked on the Isle of Man with the loss of two of her crew. She was on a voyage from Liverpool to New York, United States. |
| Laird | United Kingdom | The ship was driven ashore at Plymouth, Devon, or at Portsmouth, Hampshire. |
| Lord Duncan | United Kingdom | The ship struck the pier at Bridlington, Yorkshire, and sank. |
| Mary & Peggy | United Kingdom | The ship was driven ashore near Wicklow. She was on a voyage from Waterford to Dublin. |
| Maglona | United Kingdom | The ship.was driven ashore near Newry. She was on a voyage from Liverpool to Dublin. |
| Melantho | United Kingdom | The ship was wrecked in the Isles of Scilly while on a voyage from London to Tortola. |
| Santa Nicolla Princessa Alessandra | Spain | The ship was driven ashore on the Anatolian coast while on a voyage from "Tagamock" to Smyrna, Ottoman Empire. |
| Sophia | United Kingdom | The ship foundered in the English Channel off Boulogne while on a voyage from Surinam to London. |
| St. Antonio and Almas | Portugal | The ship foundered in the Baltic Sea off Riga, Russia. her crew were rescued. She was on a voyage from Saint Petersburg, Russia, to Porto. |
| Susan or Swan | (United Kingdom of Great Britain and Ireland) British North America | War of the Second Coalition: The brig was captured and burnt by La Curieuse, Mutine and Espérance (all French Navy). She was on a voyage from Halifax, Nova Scotia, to Surinam. |
| Susannah | Danzig | The ship was abandoned in the North Sea whilst of a voyage from Danzig to Plymouth. She was later taken in to Aldeburgh, Suffolk, United Kingdom. |
| Thomas and William | United Kingdom | The sloop was wrecked in the Isles of Scilly while on a voyage from Neath, Glamorgan, to Falmouth, Cornwall. |
| Two Friends | United Kingdom | The ship was driven ashore at Portland, Dorset, and wrecked. She was on a voyage from Gibraltar to London. |
| Two Friends | United Kingdom | The ship was driven ashore near Conway, Denbighshire. She was on a voyage from Hamburg to Liverpool. |
| Valiant | United Kingdom | The ship foundered in the Adriatic Sea off Venice while on a voyage from Falmouth, Cornwall, to Venice. |
| Vrouw Jeseina | Hamburg | The ship foundered in the English Channel off Dover, Kent, United Kingdom, while on a voyage from Hamburg to Liverpool. |
| Eight unnamed vessels | United Netherlands Navy | The ships of the line were driven ashore at Vlissingen, Zeeland. |
| Three unnamed vessels | France | Two full-rigged ships and a brig were driven ashore near Barfleur, Manche. |

== February ==
=== 2 February ===
List of shipwrecks: 2 February 1801
| Ship | State | Description |
|---|---|---|
| Caroline | United Kingdom | The ship foundered off Jamaica. Her crew were rescued. She was on a voyage from Jamaica to Liverpool, Lancashire. She was carrying passengers and mail that Grantham Packet, which had been wrecked off Barbados on 18 December 1800, had been scheduled to take to England. Princess Amelia carried the mail and passengers to Falmouth. |
| HMS Legere | Royal Navy | The sloop-of-war was wrecked near Cartagenia, Viceroyalty of New Granada. Her crew survived. |

=== 3 February ===
List of shipwrecks: 3 February 1801
| Ship | State | Description |
|---|---|---|
| Orono | United States | The ship was driven ashore at Londonderry, United Kingdom. She was on a voyage from Philadelphia, Pennsylvania, to Londonderry. |

=== 6 February ===
List of shipwrecks: 6 February 1801
| Ship | State | Description |
|---|---|---|
| Denton | United Kingdom | The transport ship was wrecked at Guernsey, Channel Islands. |

=== 8 February ===
List of shipwrecks: 8 February 1801
| Ship | State | Description |
|---|---|---|
| Duke of Richmond | United Kingdom | The ship foundered while on a voyage from British Honduras to London with the loss of 22 of the 34 people on board. Survivors were rescued by Mary (United Kingdom). |

=== 9 February ===
List of shipwrecks: 9 February 1801
| Ship | State | Description |
|---|---|---|
| Denton | United Kingdom | The transport ship was wrecked at Guernsey, Channel Islands. |

=== 11 February ===
List of shipwrecks: 11 February 1801
| Ship | State | Description |
|---|---|---|
| Mary | United States | The brig was abandoned in the Atlantic Ocean (39°20′N 54°00′W) by her crew after naving sprung a leak some days previously while on a voyage from New York to an Irish port. They were rescued by Hope United Kingdom. |
| Peggy | United Kingdom | The ship was wrecked on the Cockle Sand, in the North Sea off the coast of Norfolk with the loss of all hands. She was on a voyage from South Shields, County Durham to London. |

=== 13 February ===
List of shipwrecks: 13 February 1801
| Ship | State | Description |
|---|---|---|
| York | United Kingdom | The ship was wrecked at Dublin. |

=== 16 February ===
List of shipwrecks: 16 February 1801
| Ship | State | Description |
|---|---|---|
| Peggy | United Kingdom | The ship foundered while on a voyage from Limerick to London. Her crew were rescued by Ann (United States). |
| Sally | United Kingdom | The ship foundered in the North Sea off Blakeney, Norfolk, with the loss of two of her crew. She was on a voyage from King's Lynn, Norfolk, to Bridport, Dorset. |

=== 17 February ===
List of shipwrecks: 17 February 1801
| Ship | State | Description |
|---|---|---|
| London | United Kingdom | War of the Second Coalition: The transport ship was wrecked on The Merlins, in the Atlantic Ocean south of Lisbon, Portugal, while attempting to avoid capture by a privateer. Twenty of the 25 people on board were lost. She was on a voyage from Portsmouth, Hampshire, to Menorca, Spain. Nineteen of the 24 people on board were killed. |

=== 20 February ===
List of shipwrecks: 20 February 1801
| Ship | State | Description |
|---|---|---|
| Kitty | United Kingdom | The ship was driven ashore at Great Yarmouth, Norfolk. |
| Sophia | United Kingdom | The ship was driven ashore at Great Yarmouth. |
| Unnamed | United Kingdom | The ship was driven ashore near Great Yarmouth. |
| Unnamed | United Kingdom | The collier ran aground on the South Bull, off the coast of County Dublin with the loss of two of her crew. |

=== 21 February ===
List of shipwrecks: 21 February 1801
| Ship | State | Description |
|---|---|---|
| Duckenfield Hall | United Kingdom | HMS Russell had towed "Duckingfield Hall" into Torbay. She had been sailing from Antigua to London when off the Scilly Islands another vessel had run foul of her. Duckenfield Hall had lost her foremast, and her fore, main, and mizzen topmasts; the vessel that ran into her was believed to have foundered. |
| Unnamed | United Kingdom | The cutter ran aground on the Hook Sand, off Poole Harbour, Dorset and was abandoned by her crew. She subsequently floated off and drove out to sea. |

=== 22 February ===
List of shipwrecks: 22 February 1801
| Ship | State | Description |
|---|---|---|
| Citizen Blackman | France | War of the Second Coalition: The privateer was run ashore and wrecked near Calais whilst involved in an action with HMS Shannon (Royal Navy). |

=== 24 February ===
List of shipwrecks: 24 February 1801
| Ship | State | Description |
|---|---|---|
| Betsey | United States | The ship foundered while on a voyage from Lisbon, Portugal, to Philadelphia, Pennsylvania. Her crew were rescued. |

=== Unknown date ===
List of shipwrecks: Unknown date in February 1801
| Ship | State | Description |
|---|---|---|
| Albion | United Kingdom | The transport ship was wrecked at Marseille, Bouches-du-Rhône, France. |
| Arcaide | United Kingdom | The ship was severely damaged by fire at Hull, Yorkshire. |
| Betsey | United Kingdom | The ship foundered in the Atlantic Ocean off the Virginia Capes, United States. |
| HM hired cutter Charming Molly | Royal Navy | The hired armed cutter foundered in the Seine Bay off the Îles Saint-Marcouf with the loss of all hands. |
| Dolphin | United Kingdom | The ship was driven ashore near Blackpool, Lancashire. She was on a voyage from Great Yarmouth, Norfolk, to Liverpool, Lancashire. |
| Eliza | United Kingdom | The ship foundered in the Boston Deeps, off the coast of Lincolnshire. Her crew were rescued. |
| Fame | United Kingdom | The ship was driven ashore near Sligo and severely damaged. She was on a voyage from Sligo to Liverpool. |
| Four Sisters | United Kingdom | The ship was driven ashore on the coast of Lincolnshire. She was later refloated and taken in to Hull for repairs. |
| Franklin | United Kingdom | The ship was wrecked on the Swin, in the North Sea. |
| Hoopen de Zeeman | Hamburg | The ship was driven ashore near Étaples, Pas-de-Calais, France. She was on a voyage from Hamburg to Nantes, Loire-Inférieure, France. |
| Hope | Batavian Republic | The ship was wrecked at the mouth of the River Thames. She was on a voyage from Rotterdam, South Holland to London, United Kingdom. |
| Infant Ann | United Kingdom | The ship foundered in the Atlantic Ocean off the Cape Verde Islands, Portugal. She was on a voyage from Liverpool to Africa. |
| Jannet | United Kingdom | The ship was driven ashore and wrecked near Formby, Lancashire, while on a voyage from Newry, County Down, to Liverpool. |
| Justina | United Kingdom | The ship was wrecked on the coast of the Isle of Man with the loss of two of her crew. |
| Lady Wentworth | United States | The ship foundered in the Atlantic Ocean off Rhode Island while on a voyage from New York to Halifax, British North America. |
| Lighthorse | United States | The ship was wrecked in the Solway Firth while on a voyage from Baltimore, Maryland, to Bremen. |
| Lucy | United States | The ship was wrecked at Calais, France, while on a voyage from Amsterdam, North Holland, Batavian Republic, to Málaga or Madeira, Spain. |
| Magnanimitas | Bremen | The ship was lost at Saint-Domingue, Hispaniola while on a voyage from Bremen to Saint-Domingue. |
| Mary | United Kingdom | The sloop foundered in the Irish Sea off Wexford. |
| Mary and Peggy | United Kingdom | The ship was driven ashore near Wicklow. She was on a voyage from Waterford to Dublin. |
| Montrose | United Kingdom | The ship foundered in the North Sea while on a voyage from Montrose, Forfarshire, to Sunderland, County Durham. Her crew were rescued by a foreign brig. |
| Orona | United Kingdom | The ship foundered off Londonderry while on a voyage from Philadelphia, Pennsylvania, to Londonderry. |
| Perseverance | United Kingdom | The ship foundered off the coast of Norfolk with the loss of all hands. She was on a voyage from South Shields, County Durham to London. |
| Pomona | United Kingdom | The ship was wrecked at Mahón, Spain, while on a voyage from Gibraltar to Menorca, Spain. |
| Prudence | United Kingdom | The ship was driven ashore in the River Mersey. She was on a voyage from Liverpool to Philadelphia, Pennsylvania. |
| HMS Requin | Royal Navy | War of the Second Coalition: The sloop-of-war struck a rock off Quiberon, Morbihan, France, and sank. Her crew survived but twenty were taken prisoner by the French. |
| Senegal | (France) Senegal | War of the Second Coalition: The brig was captured by HMS Melpomene (Royal Navy) at Senegal. She ran aground and sank whilst being taken out of port. |
| HM hired brig Telegraph | Royal Navy | The hired armed brig foundered in the Atlantic Ocean off Cape Ortegal, Spain, on or after 14 February with the loss of all hands. |
| Thames | United Kingdom | The ship struck the Haisborough Sands, in the North Sea off the coast of Norfolk. She was consequently beached at Mundesley, Norfolk. Thames was on a voyage from Dundee, Forfarshire, to London. |
| Triton | United Kingdom | The ship was wrecked in the Weser. Her crew were rescued. She was on a voyage from London to Bremen. |
| Two Brothers | United Kingdom | The ship was driven ashore on the coast of Lincolnshire. She was on a voyage from Sunderland to Wisbech, Cambridgeshire. Two Brothers was later refloated and taken in to Hull for repairs. |
| Union | United Kingdom | The ship foundered. |
| Venus | United Kingdom | The transport ship foundered off Menorca, Spain. |
| William & Mary | United Kingdom | War of the Second Coalition: The ship was captured and recaptured, but was subsequently lost. She was on a voyage from Bristol, Gloucestershire, to Portsmouth, Hampshire. |
| Zealous | United Kingdom | The ship was wrecked at Copenhagen, Denmark, while on a voyage from Copenhagen to London. |

== March ==
=== 2 March ===
List of shipwrecks: 2 March 1801
| Ship | State | Description |
|---|---|---|
| Exbury | United Kingdom | The sloop foundered in the English Channel off the Isle of Wight. |

=== 4 March ===
List of shipwrecks: 4 March 1801
| Ship | State | Description |
|---|---|---|
| Warrior | United Kingdom | The ship ran aground on the Goodwin Sands, Kent. She was refloated with assistance. |

=== 6 March ===
List of shipwrecks: 6 March 1801
| Ship | State | Description |
|---|---|---|
| Aurora | United Kingdom | The ship departed from Liverpool, Lancashire, for Amsterdam, North Holland, Batavian Republic. No further trace, presumed foundered with the loss of all hands. |

=== 15 March ===
List of shipwrecks: 15 March 1801
| Ship | State | Description |
|---|---|---|
| Neptunus | Prussia | The ship was driven ashore off Elsinore, Denmark. |

=== 16 March ===
List of shipwrecks: 16 March 1801
| Ship | State | Description |
|---|---|---|
| HMS Invincible | Royal Navy | The third-rate ship of the line was wrecked on the Hammond Knoll, in the North Sea off the coast of Norfolk with the loss of over 400 lives. There were 196 survivors. |

=== 17 March ===
List of shipwrecks: 17 March 1801
| Ship | State | Description |
|---|---|---|
| James | United Kingdom | The ship was wrecked at Lancaster, Lancashire with the loss of fifteen of the eighteen people on board. She was on a voyage from Whitehaven to Liverpool. |

=== 19 March ===
List of shipwrecks: 19 March 1801
| Ship | State | Description |
|---|---|---|
| Leith Packet | United Kingdom | The ship sank at Scarborough, Yorkshire, as a consequence of striking a submerged rock off Filey. She was on a voyage from Hull, Yorkshire to Leith, Lothian. |
| Musgrave | United Kingdom | The ship was wrecked on the Chinqueque Shoals while on a voyage from Liverpool, Lancashire, to Virginia, United States. Her crew were rescued. |

=== 20 March ===
List of shipwrecks: 20 March 1801
| Ship | State | Description |
|---|---|---|
| Christian | United Kingdom | The sloop was driven ashore and wrecked at Aberdeen. |
| Diana | United Kingdom | The ship was driven ashore and wrecked at Great Yarmouth, Norfolk, while on a voyage from Berwick-upon-Tweed, Northumberland to London. One of her crew was lost. |

=== 21 March ===
List of shipwrecks: 21 March 1801
| Ship | State | Description |
|---|---|---|
| Resolution | United Kingdom | The ship was abandoned in the North Sea off Lowestoft, Suffolk. Her seven crew were rescued by HMRC Swan ( Board of Customs). |

=== 23 March ===
List of shipwrecks: 23 March 1801
| Ship | State | Description |
|---|---|---|
| Crescent | United Kingdom | Atlantic slave trade: The ship foundered in the Atlantic Ocean while on a voyage from Angola to the West Indies with a cargo of 298 slaves. Twenty-two to 30 of her crew are reported to have survived the foundering. |
| Friends | United Kingdom | The ship was abandoned in the Dogger Bank. Her crew were rescued by the collier John (United Kingdom). Friends was on a voyage from Poole, Dorset to Gainsborough, Lincolnshire. She was subsequently discovered 30 leagues (78 nmi; 140 km) off Flamborough Head, Yorkshire by HM Hired armed ship Solebay (Royal Navy) and taken in to Great Yarmouth, Norfolk. |

=== 24 March ===
List of shipwrecks: 24 March 1801
| Ship | State | Description |
|---|---|---|
| HMS Fulminante | Royal Navy | The ship was driven ashore and wrecked at Damiette, Ottoman Egypt. Her crew survived. |

=== 25 March ===
List of shipwrecks: 25 March 1801
| Ship | State | Description |
|---|---|---|
| HMS Scout | Royal Navy | The corvette was wrecked in the English Channel off the Isle of Wight. Her crew were rescued by HMS Beaver (Royal Navy). |

=== 29 March ===
List of shipwrecks: 29 March 1801
| Ship | State | Description |
|---|---|---|
| Alknomack | United States | The ship was driven ashore and wrecked at Sandy Hook, New Jersey. She was on a voyage from New York to Liverpool, Lancashire, United Kingdom. |
| William | United Kingdom | The ship was driven ashore and wrecked at Sandy Hook. She was on a voyage from New York to the Clyde. |

=== Unknown date ===
List of shipwrecks: Unknown date in March 1801
| Ship | State | Description |
|---|---|---|
| Abercromby | United Kingdom | The East Indiaman was lost at the mouth of the Hooghly River with the loss of about 60 lives. She was on a voyage from Coringa to Bombay, India. |
| Ann | United Kingdom | The ship foundered while on a voyage from Swansea, Glamorgan, to Porto, Portugal. Her crew were rescued. |
| Catherine | United Kingdom | The ship struck the Haisborough Sands, in the North Sea off the coast of Norfolk. She was consequently beached at Winterton-on-Sea, Norfolk. |
| Favourite Emma | United Kingdom | The ship was wrecked in St Aubin's Bay, Jersey while on a voyage from Cork to Porto. |
| Forster | United Kingdom | The ship foundered in the North Sea off Great Yarmouth, Norfolk, while on a voyage from London to Leith, Lothian. |
| Friends Goodwill | United Kingdom | War of the Second Coalition: The ship was captured by a privateer while on a voyage from Southampton, Hampshire, to Lisbon or Porto, Portugal. She was later recaptured but was subsequently lost. |
| General Moore | United Kingdom | The transport ship was driven ashore at Dartmouth, Devon. |
| Goodintent | United Kingdom | The ship foundered off the coast of Africa while on a voyage from Africa to the West Indies. |
| James | United Kingdom | The ship was driven ashore and wrecked at São Miguel Island, Azores. |
| Juffrow Anna Catharina | Batavian Republic | The ship was driven ashore at Saint-Valery-sur-Somme, France. She was on a voyage from Plymouth, Devon, to Rotterdam, South Holland. |
| Julia | United Kingdom | The ship was wrecked at São Miguel Island, Azores. |
| Mary-Ann | United States | The ship foundered off Bermuda while on a voyage from New York to Montserrat. Her crew were rescued. |
| Minorca Packet | United Kingdom | The ship was driven ashore and wrecked at Winterton-on-Sea, Norfolk while on a voyage from Saint Petersburg, Russia, to London. |
| Montelambert | United Kingdom | The ship ran aground on the Hoyle Bank, in Liverpool Bay. She was on a voyage from Suriname and Saint Kitts to Liverpool, Lancashire. |
| Nancy | United Kingdom | The ship was driven ashore at Portland, Dorset, and wrecked while on a voyage from Looe, Cornwall, to Weymouth, Dorset. |
| Nossa Senhora do Carmo | Portugal | The ship was wrecked at Preston, Lancashire, United Kingdom, with the loss of all but one of her crew. She was on a voyage from Lisbon to Liverpool. |
| Providence | United Kingdom | The ship was wrecked at São Miguel Island, Azores. She was on a voyage from São Miguel to London. |
| Rising Sun | United Kingdom | The ship was driven ashore and wrecked at Portsmouth, Hampshire. She was on a voyage from London to Portsmouth. |
| Sally | United States | The ship was wrecked on the Dutch coast while on a voyage from Philadelphia, Pennsylvania, to Hamburg. Her crew were rescued. |
| Sally | United Kingdom | The ship sank at Dublin. She was on a voyage from Belfast, County Antrim, to London. Sally was later refloated. |
| Tamer's Delight | United Kingdom | The ship struck a rock and sank while on a voyage from Guernsey, Channel Islands, to Morlaix, Finistère, France. |
| United Brothers | United Kingdom | The ship was abandoned off the coast of Kent. She was on a voyage from Waterford to London. She was subsequently taken in to Broadstairs, Kent. |

== April ==
=== 1 April ===
List of shipwrecks: 1 April 1801
| Ship | State | Description |
|---|---|---|
| Aurora | United Kingdom | War of the Second Coalition: The ship was captured and sunk by the privateer Gironde (France). She was on a voyage from Sligo to Porto, Portugal. |

=== 2 April ===
List of shipwrecks: 2 April 1801
| Ship | State | Description |
|---|---|---|
| HDMS Indfødsretten | (Denmark) Dano-Norwegian Navy | War of the Second Coalition, Battle of Copenhagen: The 64-gun ship of the line was captured by the Royal Navy. She was set afire and sunk after the battle. |
| xxxx | United Kingdom | The . |

=== 4 April ===
List of shipwrecks: 4 April 1801
| Ship | State | Description |
|---|---|---|
| Charlotte | United Kingdom | War of the Second Coalition: The brig was captured by the privateer frigate Braave (France) in the Atlantic Ocean. She was set afire and left to sink. Charlotte was on a voyage from São Miguel Island, Azores to London. |

=== 9 April ===
List of shipwrecks: 9 April 1801
| Ship | State | Description |
|---|---|---|
| New Recovery | United Kingdom | The ship was wrecked on the Haisborough Sands, Norfolk. Her crew were rescued. |

=== 10 April ===
List of shipwrecks: 10 April 1801
| Ship | State | Description |
|---|---|---|
| USS Constellation | United States Navy | While anchoring in Delaware Bay, the frigate was caught in winds and an ebb tide that laid her over on her beam ends on a sand bar. Was still aground as of 26 April, but refloated by 3 May. She suffered damage requiring extensive repairs, but returned to service after completion of the repairs. |

=== 12 April ===
List of shipwrecks: 12 April 1801
| Ship | State | Description |
|---|---|---|
| Alexander | United Kingdom | The ship was driven ashore and damaged in Torbay. She was on a voyage from London to Martinique. Alexander was later refloated. |
| James | United Kingdom | The ship was driven ashore and wrecked in Torbay. |
| Leander | United Kingdom | The ship was driven ashore in Torbay. She was on a voyage from London to Demerara. |
| Reward | United Kingdom | The ship was wrecked in Torbay while on a voyage from London to Wilmington, Delaware, United States. |

=== 13 April ===
List of shipwrecks: 13 April 1801
| Ship | State | Description |
|---|---|---|
| Brothers | United Kingdom | The ship, which had been captured by the privateer La Gironde (France) on 7 April, was wrecked on the coast of Spain. Her crew were rescued. Brothers was on a voyage from Lisbon, Portugal, to London. |
| Lord Hawke | United Kingdom | The letter of marque schooner departed from Waterford for the West Indies. No further trace, presumed foundered with the loss of all hands. |

=== 21 April ===
List of shipwrecks: 21 April 1801
| Ship | State | Description |
|---|---|---|
| Dispatch | United Kingdom | The ship was lost off Bermuda while on a voyage from Nevis to New England. |

=== 29 April ===
List of shipwrecks: 29 April 1801
| Ship | State | Description |
|---|---|---|
| Judith | United Kingdom | War of the Second Coalition: The ship was captured and burnt by the privateer Bellone (France). She was on a voyage from São Miguel Island, Azores to London. |
| Success | (United Kingdom of Great Britain and Ireland) British North America | The sealer was sunk by ice off the coast of Newfoundland. |

=== 30 April ===
List of shipwrecks: 30 April 1801
| Ship | State | Description |
|---|---|---|
| Jane | United Kingdom | The whaler was run into by James (United Kingdom) and sank off the coast of Greenland. Her crew were rescued. |

=== Unknown date ===
List of shipwrecks: Unknown date in April 1801
| Ship | State | Description |
|---|---|---|
| Columbia | United States | The ship foundered in the Grand Banks of Newfoundland while on a voyage from Philadelphia, Pennsylvania, to Liverpool, Lancashire, United Kingdom. Her crew were rescued by Lydia (United Kingdom). |
| Denton | United Kingdom | The ship was wrecked at Porto, Portugal. She was on a voyage from London to Porto. |
| Dorothea | United Kingdom | The ship was wrecked on Scroby Sands, Norfolk. Her crew were rescued. |
| Elizabeth | United Kingdom | The ship was wrecked on the Ridear Sand, in the North Sea. |
| Favonius | United Kingdom | The ship sprang a leak while on a voyage from Demerara to London and was abandoned by her crew. They were rescued by Tyson (United Kingdom). |
| Gordon | United Kingdom | The ship foundered in the Atlantic Ocean off Porto. |
| Heart of Oak | United Kingdom | The ship was wrecked on the Ridear Sand. Her crew were rescued. |
| Mandona del Rosario | Trieste | The ship caught fire and sank while on a voyage from Latichea, Greece, to Trieste. |
| Margaretta | Bremen | The ship was lost in the Weser. She was on a voyage from Bremen to London. |
| Margaretta Maria | Rostock | The ship was wrecked on Møn, Denmark. She was on a voyage from Rostock to Hull, Yorkshire, United Kingdom. |
| Nancy | United Kingdom | The ship caught fire at Portsmouth, Hampshire, and was scuttled. |
| Ocean | United Kingdom | The ship was wrecked on "Hasker Island". She was on a voyage from Liverpool to Dunbar, Lothian. |
| Peace | United Kingdom | The ship was driven ashore at Great Yarmouth, Norfolk. |
| Rambler | United Kingdom | The ship was run down by a collier and sunk in the River Thames at Barking, Essex. |
| Rising Sun | United Kingdom | The ship was driven ashore and wrecked at Portsmouth, Hampshire. |
| Speculator | United Kingdom | The ship foundered in the English Channel off Boulogne, Pas-de-Calais, France. Her crew were rescued. |
| Soldorado | Portugal | The ship was wrecked at Porto while on a voyage from Rio de Janeiro, Brazil, to Porto. |
| Sukey | United States | The ship was wrecked at Jersey, Channel Islands. |
| Thames | United Kingdom | War of the Second Coalition: The ship was captured in the North Sea by the privateer Bellona (France) while on a voyage from Sunderland, County Durham, to London. She was set afire and sunk. |
| Tyson | United Kingdom | The ship was driven ashore and wrecked at Lytham St. Annes, Lancashire while on a voyage from Demerara to Lancaster, Lancashire. |
| Young Peter | United Kingdom | The ship was wrecked at Porto. She was on a voyage from Liverpool to Porto. |

== May ==
=== 2 May ===
List of shipwrecks: 2 May 1801
| Ship | State | Description |
|---|---|---|
| Volunteer | United Kingdom | The sloop foundered in the English Channel off Bexhill-on-Sea, Sussex. Her crew were rescued. She was on a voyage from Newhaven, Sussex, to London. Volunteer was later raised and taken in to Newhaven. |

=== 3 May ===
List of shipwrecks: 3 May 1801
| Ship | State | Description |
|---|---|---|
| Rebecca | United States | The ship was driven ashore and wrecked at North Point, Baltimore, Maryland, while on a voyage from Baltimore to a European port. |

=== 13 May ===
List of shipwrecks: 13 May 1801
| Ship | State | Description |
|---|---|---|
| Unnamed | United States | The vessel went aground and was wrecked at Dunkerque, Nord, France. |

=== 22 May ===
List of shipwrecks: 22 May 1801
| Ship | State | Description |
|---|---|---|
| HMS Madras | Royal Navy | The fourth rate ran aground on the Bembridge Ledge, off the Isle of Wight and was severely damaged. She was on a voyage from Yarmouth, Isle of Wight to Portsmouth, Hampshire. She was refloated with assistance from HMS Eurydice and HMS Hussar (both Royal Navy). |

=== 23 May ===
List of shipwrecks: 23 May 1801
| Ship | State | Description |
|---|---|---|
| Hector | United Kingdom | The ship foundered in the Atlantic Ocean with the loss of a passenger. Survivors were rescued by Will (United Kingdom). |

=== 26 May ===
List of shipwrecks: 23 May 1801
| Ship | State | Description |
|---|---|---|
| Ann | (United Kingdom of Great Britain and Ireland) Jamaica | The schooner was run onto rocks off Manchioneal whilst engaged in an action with a Spanish privateer. The Spanish murdered her captain. |

=== Unknown date ===
List of shipwrecks: Unknown date in May 1801
| Ship | State | Description |
|---|---|---|
| Ann | United Kingdom | The ship was driven ashore and wrecked near Milford, Pembrokeshire. She was on a voyage from Dublin to Bristol, Gloucestershire. |
| Assistance | United Kingdom | The ship was driven ashore at The Shingles, near Lymington, Hampshire, while on a voyage from Carlisle, Cumberland, to Southampton, Hampshire. |
| Eliza | United States | The ship was driven ashore at Liverpool, Lancashire, and was damaged. She was on a voyage from Charleston, South Carolina, United States, to Liverpool. |
| La Mouche | France | War of the Second Coalition: The privateer was run aground and destroyed in the Canary Islands, Spain, by HMS Diamond (Royal Navy). |
| Mary | United Kingdom | The ship foundered in the North Sea off Cromer, Norfolk, while on a voyage from Gainsborough, Lincolnshire, to London. |
| Mary Ann | United Kingdom | The ship foundered while on a voyage from Surinam to Liverpool. Her crew were rescued by Esther (United Kingdom). |
| Mercurius | Bremen | The ship was driven ashore near Middelburg, Zeeland, Batavian Republic. She was on a voyage from Bremen to London. |
| Morning Star | United Kingdom | The ship foundered in the English Channel off Guernsey, Channel Islands. |
| Speculation | United Kingdom | War of the Second Coalition: The ship was captured by the privateer frigate Braave (France) while on a voyage from Ipswich, Suffolk, to Chester, Cheshire. She was set afire and sunk. |
| Sovereign | United Kingdom | The ship was wrecked on Cape Breton Island, Nova Scotia, British North America. She was on a voyage from London to Quebec City, Lower Canada, British North America. |
| Success | United Kingdom | War of the Second Coalition: The ship was captured and burnt by the privateer Braave (France). She was on a voyage from São Miguel Island, Azores to Whitehaven, Cumberland. |
| Zoroaster | United Kingdom | The ship was lost off the Cannonore while on a voyage from China to Bombay. |
| Unnamed | Flag unknown | The brig ran aground on The Shingles. |

== June ==
=== 8 June ===
List of shipwrecks: 8 June 1801
| Ship | State | Description |
|---|---|---|
| Ann | United States | The brig was wrecked on Long Island. She was on a voyage from New York to Liverpool, Lancashire, United Kingdom. |
| Rockingham | United Kingdom | The East Indiaman ran aground on a reef in the Red Sea, suffering heavy damage. She was towed off and reached port safely. |

=== 9 June ===
List of shipwrecks: 9 June 1801
| Ship | State | Description |
|---|---|---|
| Harriot | United Kingdom | The ship was severely damaged by fire at Boston, Massachusetts, United States. She was on a voyage from Liverpool, Lancashire, to Boston. |
| HMS Meleager | Royal Navy | The fifth-rate frigate was wrecked on the Triangles Shoal in the Gulf of Mexico. Her crew survived. |

=== Unknown date ===
List of shipwrecks: Unknown date in June 1801
| Ship | State | Description |
|---|---|---|
| Alexander | United Kingdom | The ship was lost on the Keys, off the coast of British Honduras. Her crew were rescued. |
| Betsey & Susan | United Kingdom | War of the Second Coalition: The ship was captured and burnt by the privateer Braave (France). She was on a voyage from Demerara to Liverpool. |
| Caroline | United Kingdom | The ship was driven ashore near Boulogne, Pas-de-Calais, France. She was on a voyage from Virginia, United States, to London. |
| Couriere | United Kingdom | The ship was wrecked in the North Sea off Harwich, Essex. Her crew were rescued. She was on a voyage from Pilau, Prussia, to London. |
| Four Sisters | United Kingdom | The ship capsized at Guernsey, Channel Islands. She was on a voyage from Guernsey to London. |
| Frederick Wilhelm | Danzig | The ship was driven ashore on the coast of Jutland. She was on a voyage from Danzig to Dublin, United Kingdom. |
| Hope | United Kingdom | The sloop was driven ashore in St Brides Bay and was severely damaged. She was on a voyage from Lime, Dorset, to Liverpool. Hope was later taken in to Milford, Pembrokeshire. |
| Lester | United Kingdom | The ship was lost off Newfoundland, British North America. |
| Trott | United Kingdom | The packet ship foundered off Sable Island, British North America, while on a voyage from Boston, Massachusetts, United States, to Liverpool. Her crew were rescued. |
| Unnamed | Spain | War of the Second Coalition: The ship, a prize of HMS Bordelais (Royal Navy) foundered off St. Domingo with the loss of twelve lives. |

== July ==
=== 6 July ===
List of shipwrecks: 6 July 1801
| Ship | State | Description |
|---|---|---|
| Desaix | French Navy | War of the Second Coalition, First Battle of Algeciras: The Téméraire-class ship of the line was driven ashore in Algeciras Bay. Subsequently refloated, repaired and returned to service. |
| HMS Hannibal | Royal Navy | War of the Second Coalition, First Battle of Algeciras: The Culloden-class ship of the line ran aground in Algeciras Bay. Subsequently captured by the French and entered French Navy service as Annibal. |
| Indomptable | French Navy | War of the Second Coalition, First Battle of Algeciras: The Tonnant-class ship of the line was driven ashore in Algeciras Bay. Subsequently refloated, repaired and returned to service. |

=== 7 July ===
List of shipwrecks: 7 July 1801
| Ship | State | Description |
|---|---|---|
| Ambuscade | United Netherlands Navy | The frigate sprang a leak and capsized in the Thames Estuary 3 nautical miles (5.6 km) off Sheerness, Kent, United Kingdom, with the loss of 23 lives. She was refloated on 18 July with assistance from Brœderschap (Batavian Republic) and four lighters and was beached on the Isle of Grain, Kent. |
| HMS Augustus | Royal Navy | The gunboat was wrecked at The Citadel, Plymouth, Devon. |

=== 13 July ===
List of shipwrecks: 13 July 1801
| Ship | State | Description |
|---|---|---|
| Perla | Spanish Navy | War of the Second Coalition, Second Battle of Algeciras: The frigate foundered off the Barbary Coast due to damage sustained in battle. |
| Real Carlos | Spanish Navy | Real Carlos and San Hermenegildo. War of the Second Coalition, Second Battle of Algeciras: The Santa Ana-class ship of the line caught fire, exploded and sank in Algeciras Bay with the loss of about 850 lives. She had fired on San Hermengegildo (Spanish Navy) in the confusion of battle. |
| San Hermenegildo | Spanish Navy | War of the Second Coalition, Second Battle of Algeceiras: The Santa Ana-class ship of the line caught fire, exploded and sank in Algeciras Bay with the loss of about 850 lives. She had fired on Real Carlos (Spanish Navy) in the confusion of battle. |
| HMS Venerable | Royal Navy | War of the Second Coalition, Second Battle of Algeciras : The Culloden-class ship of the line was driven ashore in Algeciras Bay. Subsequently refloated and returned to service. |

=== 16 July ===
List of shipwrecks: 16 July 1801
| Ship | State | Description |
|---|---|---|
| Sir Sidney Smith | United Kingdom | The ship was severely damaged in a storm at Portsmouth, Hampshire. |
| Speedwell | United Kingdom | The ship was wrecked at Gibraltar. She was on a voyage from Martinique to Gibraltar. |

=== 20 July ===
List of shipwrecks: 20 July 1801
| Ship | State | Description |
|---|---|---|
| Charlotta | Sweden | The ship was wrecked on the Haisborough Sands, Norfolk, United Kingdom, while on a voyage from Gothenburg to Dublin, United Kingdom. |

=== 21 July ===
List of shipwrecks: 21 July 1801
| Ship | State | Description |
|---|---|---|
| HMS Jason | Royal Navy | War of the Second Coalition: The fifth-rate was wrecked off Saint-Malo, Ille-et-Vilaine, France. Her crew survived by were taken prisoner by the French. The wreck was blown up on 5 August to prevent her being refloated and taken into French Navy service. |

=== 22 July ===
List of shipwrecks: 22 July 1801
| Ship | State | Description |
|---|---|---|
| Bellona | United Kingdom | The ship was driven ashore at New Providence, New Jersey, United States. She was later refloated. |
| Deception | United Kingdom | The ship was driven ashore and wrecked at New Providence. |
| Fraternite | Denmark | The Guineaman was driven ashore and wrecked at New Providence. |
| Lion's Revenge | United Kingdom | The ship was driven ashore at New Providence. She was later refloated. |
| Lovely Lass | United Kingdom | The ship was driven ashore and wrecked at New Providence. |
| Peace | United Kingdom | The ship was driven ashore at New Providence. She was later refloated. |
| Sheerwater | United Kingdom | The ship was driven ashore at New Providence. She was later refloated. |
| St. Joseph | Spain | The brig was driven ashore and wrecked at New Providence. |

=== 25 July ===
List of shipwrecks: 25 July 1801
| Ship | State | Description |
|---|---|---|
| Actress | United States | The ship was wrecked on Little Caicos Island. She was on a voyage from New York to Jamaica. |

=== 30 July ===
List of shipwrecks: 30 July 1801
| Ship | State | Description |
|---|---|---|
| Thomas and Hannah | United Kingdom | The ship foundered in the North Sea off Cromer, Norfolk, with the loss of her captain. |

=== Unknown date ===
List of shipwrecks: Unknown date in July 1801
| Ship | State | Description |
|---|---|---|
| Lady Cremorne | United Kingdom | The ship was holed by her anchor at Liverpool, Lancashire, and sank. She was on a voyage from Antigua to Liverpool. |
| Neotunus | United Kingdom | The ship ran aground off Portsmouth, Hampshire and was damaged. She was on a voyage from London to Lisbon, Portugal. |
| Orion | United Kingdom | The ship foundered off the Orkney Islands while on a voyage from Dublin to Sligo. |
| Pitt | United Kingdom | The ship was driven ashore on the Irish coast while on a voyage from Virginia, United States, to the Clyde. |
| Polly | United Kingdom | The ship foundered in the North Sea off Whitby, Yorkshire. She was on a voyage from Sunderland, County Durham, to Whitby. |
| Ruth | United Kingdom | The ship was driven ashore at Margate, Kent. She was on a voyage from Bangor, Caernarfonshire, to London. |
| Unnamed | Spain | War of the Second Coalition: The ship, a prize of HMS Cerberus (Royal Navy) foundered off the coast of Cuba with the loss of twelve lives. |

== August ==
=== 3 August ===
List of shipwrecks: 3 August 1801
| Ship | State | Description |
|---|---|---|
| Malabar | British East India Company | The East Indiaman was destroyed by fire at Madras, India. She was on a voyage from Madras to London. |

=== 4 August ===
List of shipwrecks: 4 August 1801
| Ship | State | Description |
|---|---|---|
| Ten unnamed vessels | French Navy | War of the Second Coalition, Raids on Boulogne: Four flats and a brig were sunk in a British raid at Boulogne, Pas-de-Calais. Six others were driven ashore. Five of the six were later refloated. |

=== 5 August ===
List of shipwrecks: 5 August 1801
| Ship | State | Description |
|---|---|---|
| Charlotte | Royal Navy | War of the Second Coalition The tender was seized by 30 Dutch prisoners of war off the Middle Sand, in the North Sea off the coast of Essex. They ran her aground on the East Barrow Sand. Eleven of the prisoners of war took to a boat with the intention of reaching the French or Dutch coast. Charlotte was refloated and taken in to Sheerness, Kent. |

=== 7 August ===
List of shipwrecks: 7 August 1801
| Ship | State | Description |
|---|---|---|
| Edward | United Kingdom | The ship was wrecked at Martinique. She was on a voyage from London to British Honduras. |

=== 9 August ===
List of shipwrecks: 9 August 1801
| Ship | State | Description |
|---|---|---|
| Polly | United Kingdom | The sloop foundered in the North Sea off Whitby, Yorkshire, with the loss of all hands. |

=== 10 August ===
List of shipwrecks: 10 August 1801
| Ship | State | Description |
|---|---|---|
| Auspicious | United Kingdom | The ship was wrecked on Heneaga. Her crew were rescued. She was on a voyage from Jamaica to London. |
| Bushy Park | United Kingdom | The ship was wrecked on Heneaga. Her crew were rescued. She was on a voyage from Jamaica to London. |
| Fanny | United Kingdom | The ship was wrecked on Heneaga. Her crew were rescued. She was on a voyage from Jamaica to Liverpool, Lancashire. |
| Jason | United Kingdom | The ship was wrecked on Heneaga. Her crew were rescued. She was on a voyage from Jamaica to London. |
| HMS Lowestoffe | Royal Navy | The fifth-rate frigate was wrecked on Heneaga with the loss of five of her crew. |
| Melton | United Kingdom | The ship was wrecked on Heneaga. Her crew were rescued. She was on a voyage from Jamaica to London. |
| Swansea | United Kingdom | The ship was lost on Heneaga while on a voyage from Jamaica to London. |

=== 18 August ===
List of shipwrecks: 18 August 1801
| Ship | State | Description |
|---|---|---|
| Success | United Kingdom | The galley was driven ashore and wrecked on Ambon Island with the loss of ten of her crew. |

=== 21 August ===
List of shipwrecks: 21 August 1801
| Ship | State | Description |
|---|---|---|
| HMS Spitfire | Royal Navy | The schooner was wrecked on a reef off the coast of Africa and north of the Amirante Islands. Her crew survived. |
| Four unnamed vessels | French Navy | War of the Second Coalition: The gunboats were sunk off Saint-Valery-sur-Somme, Somme by HMS Jamaica. |

=== 31 August ===
List of shipwrecks: 31 August 1801
| Ship | State | Description |
|---|---|---|
| Stranger | United Kingdom | The ship was wrecked on the Shoals of Granda off the African coast with the loss of all hands. |

=== Unknown date ===
List of shipwrecks: Unknown date in August 1801
| Ship | State | Description |
|---|---|---|
| Amity | United Kingdom | The ship was driven ashore and severely damaged at Liverpool, Lancashire. She was on a voyage from Philadelphia, Pennsylvania, United States to Liverpool. |
| Bee | United Kingdom | The ship foundered while on a voyage from Lisbon, Portugal, to London. Her crew were rescued. |
| Catharina Blendina | Danzig | The ship was lost on the coast of Norway. She was on a voyage from Liverpool to Danzig. |
| Catherine | United Kingdom | The ship is presumed to have foundered whilst on a voyage from Lisbon to Liverpool. |
| Friendship | United Kingdom | The ship was driven ashore at Wexford. She was on a voyage from Dublin to Cork. |
| Helen | United Kingdom | The ship was driven ashore. She was later refloated and taken in to Helsingør, Denmark. |
| Iphigenia | United Kingdom | The ship was destroyed by fire at Aboukir, Ottoman Egypt. |
| Jong Willem | Prussia | The ship struck a sanbank in the North Sea and consequently foundered. She was on a voyage from Emden to Newcastle upon Tyne, Northumberland, United Kingdom. |
| Louisa | Danzig | The ship was lost on the Swedish coast. She was on a voyage from Danzig to Saint Petersburg, Russia. |
| Olive | United Kingdom | The ship was driven ashore at Benacre, Suffolk, and was wrecked. |
| Nottingham | United Kingdom | The ship was wrecked on Scroby Sands, Norfolk. Her crew were rescued. |

== September ==
=== 2 September ===
List of shipwrecks: 2 September 1801
| Ship | State | Description |
|---|---|---|
| Succès | French Navy | War of the Second Coalition: The Amazon-class frigate was run ashore on Elba, Grand Duchy of Tuscany in an action with HMS Minerve, HMS Phoenix and HMS Pomone (all Royal Navy) and was abandoned by her crew. She was captured by the British. |
| Unnamed | French Navy | War of the Second Coalition: The frigate was run ashore on Elba in an action with some Royal Navy frigates and was abandoned by her crew. |

=== 4 September ===
List of shipwrecks: 4 September 1801
| Ship | State | Description |
|---|---|---|
| HMS Proselyte | Royal Navy | The fifth-rate frigate was wrecked on the Man of War Shoal, off Philipsburg, Sint Maarten. Her crew were rescued. |
| Walter Boyd | United Kingdom | The ship foundered while on a voyage from Martinique to London. |
| Unnamed | Flag unknown | The schooner foundered alongside Walter Boyd (United Kingdom). |

=== 5 September ===
List of shipwrecks: 5 September 1801
| Ship | State | Description |
|---|---|---|
| La Flèche | French Navy | War of the Second Coalition: The frigate was sunk off the coast of India by HMS Victor (Royal Navy). |
| Unnamed | French Navy | The gunboat ran aground off the mouth of the Canche. She was on a voyage from Dieppe, Seine-Inférieure to Boulogne, Pas-de-Calais. |

=== 7 September ===
List of shipwrecks: 7 September 1801
| Ship | State | Description |
|---|---|---|
| Flèche | French Navy | War of the Second Coalition, Action of 5 September 1801: The brig was sunk at Mahé, Seychelles by HMS Victor (Royal Navy). |

=== 8 September ===
List of shipwrecks: 8 September 1801
| Ship | State | Description |
|---|---|---|
| Gabriel | United Kingdom | British Expedition to the Red Sea: The ship wrecked in the Strait of Jubal at the entrance to the Gulf of Suez. Captain Turnbull and the crew of 100 men, and 42 women and 46 children, dependents of the 61st Regiment of Foot, were all saved. |
| Calcutta | United Kingdom | British Expedition to the Red Sea: The transport ship was wrecked. |

=== 10 September ===
List of shipwrecks: 10 September 1801
| Ship | State | Description |
|---|---|---|
| Bravoure | French Navy | The Cocarde-class frigate ran aground off Elba, Kingdom of Sicily and was a total loss. |
| Unity | United Kingdom | War of the Second Coalition: The brig ran aground at "Walden", France while on a voyage from Bideford, Devon, to Dram, Norway. She was set afire by the French and destroyed. Her crew were rescued by HMS Mariner (Royal Navy). |

=== 19 September ===
List of shipwrecks: 19 September 1801
| Ship | State | Description |
|---|---|---|
| Stephen | United Kingdom | The ship was lost on the coast of Norway. She was on a voyage from a Baltic port to Great Yarmouth, Norfolk. |

=== 20 September ===
List of shipwrecks: 20 September 1801
| Ship | State | Description |
|---|---|---|
| Aimable Adell | United Kingdom | The ship foundered in the Atlantic Ocean. Her crew were rescued by Sarah (United States). Aimable Adell was on a voyage from London to New York, United States. |

=== 21 September ===
List of shipwrecks: 21 September 1801
| Ship | State | Description |
|---|---|---|
| Pionier | United Kingdom | The ship foundered in the North Sea. Her crew were rescued. She was on a voyage from Newcastle upon Tyne, Northumberland, to Hamburg. |

=== 24 September ===
List of shipwrecks: 24 September 1801
| Ship | State | Description |
|---|---|---|
| Delight | United Kingdom | The ship was abandoned off Happisburgh, Norfolk with the loss of three of her four crew. She was on a voyage from Hull, Yorkshire to Hamburg. She was taken in to Great Yarmouth, Norfolk in a waterlogged condition. |
| Wheatfield | United Kingdom | The ship departed from Demerara for London. No further trace, presumed foundered in the Atlantic Ocean with the loss of all hands. |

=== 25 September ===
List of shipwrecks: 25 September 1801
| Ship | State | Description |
|---|---|---|
| King George | United Kingdom | The ship was driven ashore at Demerara. She was on a voyage from Demerara to London. |

=== 27 September ===
List of shipwrecks: 29 September 1801
| Ship | State | Description |
|---|---|---|
| Narcissus | Royal Navy | The Narcissus-class frigate ran aground off Sheerness, Kent and was damaged. She was refloated and taken in to Sheerness. |

=== 29 September ===
List of shipwrecks: 29 September 1801
| Ship | State | Description |
|---|---|---|
| Eliza | United Kingdom | The ship was lost on The Needings, off Varberg, Sweden, while on a voyage from Saint Petersburg, Russian Empire, to London. |
| Hoppett | Sweden | The ship was lost on The Needuings. She was on a voyage from Stockholm to an English port. |

=== Unknown date ===
List of shipwrecks: Unknown date in September 1801
| Ship | State | Description |
|---|---|---|
| Actress | United States | The ship was wrecked on Little Caicos while on a voyage from New York to Jamaica. |
| Adventure | United Kingdom | The ship was driven ashore on Gotland, Sweden. She was on a voyage from Saint Petersburg, Russia, to London. |
| Aid | United Kingdom | The ship was driven ashore near Boston, Lincolnshire. |
| Belzebub | United Kingdom | The ship was wrecked on Texel, North Holland, Batavian Republic. She was on a voyage from London to Hamburg. |
| Betsey | United Kingdom | The ship was driven ashore on Gotland. |
| Dairy-Maid | United Kingdom | The ship was driven ashore at Elsinore, Denmark. She was on a voyage from Danzig to Sunderland, County Durham. |
| Dove | United Kingdom | The ship was driven ashore near Dragør, Denmark. |
| Edward | United Kingdom | The ship was lost at Martinique. |
| Flor du Fenehall | United Kingdom | War of the Second Coalition: The ship was captured and burnt by two French frigates. She was on a voyage from the Cape Verde Islands to Madeira. |
| Hannah | United Kingdom | The ship ran aground on the Lapsand. She was on a voyage from Memel, Prussia to Maryport, Cumberland. She was later refloated and taken in to Rønne, Denmark. |
| Hariet | United States | The ship was wrecked on the coast of Virginia with loss of life. She was on a voyage from Newry, County Down, United Kingdom to Baltimore, Maryland. |
| Kingston | United Kingdom | The ship foundered in the English Channel off Dieppe, Seine-Inférieure, France while on a voyage from Lisbon, Portugal, to Dieppe. |
| Minerva | United Kingdom | The ship foundered in the North Sea. She was on a voyage from Liverpool, Lancashire, to Danzig. |
| Neptune | United Kingdom | The ship was driven ashore and severely damaged in the Cattewater. |
| Otway | United Kingdom | The ship was driven ashore in Bootle Bay. She was on a voyage from Liverpool to Africa. |
| Ptolmeus | Danzig | The ship was lost on the Swedish coast. She was on a voyage from London to Danzig. |
| Traveller | United Kingdom | The ship was driven ashore near "Hagland", Denmark. She was later refloated. |
| Wilhelm | Flag unknown | The ship was lost in the Baltic. |

== October ==
=== 2 October ===
List of shipwrecks: 2 October 1801
| Ship | State | Description |
|---|---|---|
| Braak | Royal Navy | The post ship ran aground on the Nore. |

=== 5 October ===
List of shipwrecks: 5 October 1801
| Ship | State | Description |
|---|---|---|
| Ardelia | United States | The ship departed from the Hampton Roads, Virginia, for Falmouth, Cornwall, United Kingdom. No further trace, presumed foundered with the loss of all hands. |

=== 10 October ===
List of shipwrecks: 10 October 1801
| Ship | State | Description |
|---|---|---|
| HMS Naiad | United Kingdom | The Amazon-class frigate was driven ashore at Rochefort, Charente-Inférieure, France and was severely damaged. She was refloated on 12 October and taken in to Plymouth, Devon. |

=== 20 October ===
List of shipwrecks: 20 October 1801
| Ship | State | Description |
|---|---|---|
| Enterprize | United Kingdom | The ship was wrecked on Bornholm, Denmark. Her crew were rescued. She was on a voyage from Liverpool, Lancashire, to Saint Petersburg, Russia. |
| HMS Scout | Royal Navy | The ship-sloop departed for Newfoundland, British North America. No further trace, presumed foundered with the loss of all hands. |

=== 21 October ===
List of shipwrecks: 21 October 1801
| Ship | State | Description |
|---|---|---|
| Lovely Peggy | United Kingdom | The sloop was wrecked in Bighouse Bay, Caithness with the loss of a crew member. She was on a voyage from Kristiansand, Norway to Sligo. |

=== 24 October ===
List of shipwrecks: 24 October 1801
| Ship | State | Description |
|---|---|---|
| John | United Kingdom | The ship was wrecked on Hilberry Islands. Her crew were rescued. She was on a voyage from Chester, Cheshire, to Wexford. |

=== 25 October ===
List of shipwrecks: 25 October 1801
| Ship | State | Description |
|---|---|---|
| HMS Babet | Royal Navy | The sixth rate post ship departed Martinique. No further trace, presumed foundered with the loss of all hands. |
| HMS Bonetta | Royal Navy | The sloop-of-war was wrecked on a reef in the Jardines de la Reina in the Caribbean Sea south of Cuba.. |
| Jonge Egbert | Prussia | The ship foundered. Her crew were rescued. She was on a voyage from Bilbao, Spain, to Bristol, Gloucestershire, United Kingdom. |
| Richard | United Kingdom | The ship departed Curaçao for Liverpool, Lancashire. No further trace, presumed foundered with the loss of all hands. |

=== 28 October ===
List of shipwrecks: 28 October 1801
| Ship | State | Description |
|---|---|---|
| Areana | United Kingdom | The ship was wrecked on The Shingles, Isle of Wight. |
| Friedrich Wilhelm | Russia | The ship was driven ashore on Gotland, Sweden, while on a voyage from Riga to London. |
| Lady Mary | United Kingdom | The ship was wrecked at Falsterbo, Sweden. |
| Sophia Magdalena | United Kingdom | The ship was driven ashore at Kingsdown, Kent. |
| Unnamed vessels | Sweden | The ships were driven ashore on Gotland. |

=== 30 October ===
List of shipwrecks: 30 October 1801
| Ship | State | Description |
|---|---|---|
| Hope | United Kingdom | The ship was wrecked at Lowestoft, Suffolk. |

=== Unknown date ===
List of shipwrecks: Unknown date in October 1801
| Ship | State | Description |
|---|---|---|
| Baltic Merchant | United Kingdom | The ship was wrecked on Saaremaa, Russia. Her crew were rescued. She was on a voyage from Hull, Yorkshire, to Saint Petersburg, Russia. |
| Bom Amigos | Portugal | The ship was driven ashore at Portsea, Hampshire, United Kingdom. She was on a voyage from Saint Petersburg to Lisbon. Bom Amigos was later refloated and taken in to Portsmouth, Hampshire. |
| Caroline | United Kingdom | The ship was driven ashore on Gotland, Sweden. She was on a voyage from Pärnu, Russia to Liverpool, Lancashire. She was refloated with assistance and taken in to Elsinore, Denmark. |
| Dispatch | United Kingdom | The ship was driven ashore at Castle Point, Elsinore. She was on a voyage from Saint Petersburg to Workington, Cumberland. |
| Dorothea Wilhelmina | Hamburg | The brig was wrecked near Kirkwall, Orkney Islands, United Kingdom, with the loss of her captain. She was on a voyage from Hamburg to Charleston, South Carolina, United States. |
| Elizabeth Ann | United Kingdom | The ship was holed by an anchor in the River Thames at Limehouse, Middlesex and was severely damaged. |
| Esther | United Kingdom | The ship ran aground on the Hale Sand, in the North Sea off the coast of Lincolnshire and capsized. Her crew were rescued. She was on a voyage from Arkhangelsk, Russia, to Hull. |
| George | United Kingdom | The ship ran aground at Smyrna, Ottoman Empire and was severely damaged. She was on a voyage from Smyrna to London. She was refloated and put back to Smyrna. |
| Hermit | United Kingdom | The ship was lost at Præstø, Denmark. She was on a voyage from Liverpool to a Baltic port. |
| Jamaica | United Kingdom | The ship was driven ashore and wrecked on Öland, Sweden. |
| John | United Kingdom | The ship was driven ashore in Stokes Bay. She was on a voyage from London to Gibraltar. She was refloated and taken in to Portsmouth. |
| Mary | United Kingdom | The ship sank in the River Thames. She was on a voyage from Arkhangelsk to London. |
| Neptunus | Danzig | The ship was driven ashore at Hoylake, Cheshire, United Kingdom. She was on a voyage from Liverpool, Lancashire, United Kingdom, to Danzig. |
| Renwick | United States | The ship foundered at the end of October while on a voyage from Virginia to Jamaica. |
| Sally | United Kingdom | The ship departed Martinique for Jamaica. No further trace, presumed foundered with the loss of all hands. |
| St. John | United Kingdom | The ship was driven ashore on Hogland, Russia. She was on a voyage from South Shields, County Durham, to Saint Petersburg. |
| Tejo | Portugal | The ship was driven ashore in Dingle Bay and was abandoned by some of her crew. She was on a voyage from Waterford, United Kingdom, to Lisbon. |
| True Love | United Kingdom | The ship was lost at St. Ives, Cornwall. She was on a voyage from Waterford to London. |
| Tycho de Bracke | Danzig | The ship was driven ashore at Kirkwall. She was on a voyage from Danzig to Liverpool. |

== November ==
=== 1 November ===
List of shipwrecks: 1 November 1801
| Ship | State | Description |
|---|---|---|
| HM hired armed lugger Cockchafer | Royal Navy | The hired armed lugger foundered off Guernsey, Channel Islands. Her crew were rescued. |

=== 2 November ===
List of shipwrecks: 2 November 1801
| Ship | State | Description |
|---|---|---|
| Dash | United Kingdom | The ship foundered in the Baltic Sea. |
| Flaxton | United Kingdom | The ship capsized in the Baltic Sea. Her crew were rescued by a Prussian vessel. Flaxton was later taken in to a Swedish port. |
| HMS Friendship | Royal Navy | The gunboat was driven ashore and wrecked at Saint-Malo, Ille-et-Vilaine, France. Her crew survived. |
| Hopewell | United Kingdom | The ship foundered in the North Sea off Wells-next-the-Sea, Norfolk with the loss of all eight people on board. |
| Peggy | United Kingdom | The ship was lost near Libava, Courland Governorate. |
| Peace | United Kingdom | The brig was wrecked near Staithes, Yorkshire. Her crew were rescued. She was on a voyage from King's Lynn, Norfolk to Sunderland, County Durham or Newcastle upon Tyne, Northumberland. |
| Sally | United Kingdom | The brig was driven ashore and wrecked in Mount's Bay. |
| Unnamed | United Kingdom | The brig was driven ashore and wrecked at Scarborough, Yorkshire. Her crew were rescued by the Scarborough Lifeboat. |
| Many unnamed vessels | United Kingdom | The fishing smacks were wrecked at Cromer, Norfolk with the loss of 47 lives. |
| Unnamed | United Kingdom | The ship foundered off Cromer with the loss of all hands. |
| Unnamed | United Kingdom | The cutter foundered off Sheringham, Norfolk with the loss of all seven crew. |
| Two unnamed vessels | United Kingdom | The fishing boats foundered off Runton, Norfolk with the loss of all eight crew. |
| Unnamed | Batavian Republic | The hoy was driven ashore and wrecked on Anholt, Denmark with the loss of all but two of her crew. |
| Two unnamed vessels | United Kingdom | The ships foundered off the coast of Norway with the loss of all hands. |

=== 3 November ===
List of shipwrecks: 3 November 1801
| Ship | State | Description |
|---|---|---|
| Albion | United Kingdom | The ship capsized in the Baltic Sea with the loss of a crew member. Survivors were rescued on 9 November by Cadiz Packet (United Kingdom). Albion subsequently came ashore near Karlskrona, Sweden. |
| Altona | Hamburg | The ship was driven ashore between Cuxhaven and Otterndorf, Kingdom of Hanover. She was on a voyage from Hamburg to Kristiansand, Norway. |
| Amicitia | Bremen | The ship was driven ashore near "Bremer Lee". She was on a voyage from Bremen to Málaga, Spain. |
| Dolphin | United Kingdom | The ship was wrecked near Fladstrand, Denmark, with the loss of all hands. She was on a voyage from St. Ubes, Portugal to Stockholm, Sweden. |
| HMS Friendship | United Kingdom | The gunboat was wrecked on the coast of France near Saint-Malo. Crew were saved and returned to Jersey on 15 November. |
| HDMS Iris | (Denmark) Dano-Norwegian Navy | The frigate was driven ashore at Copenhagen. |
| Jane | United Kingdom | The ship was in collision with another vessel off Great Yarmouth, Norfolk, and was abandoned by her crew. |
| Mercury | Hamburg | The ship was driven ashore between Cuxhaven and Otterndorf. She was on a voyage from Hamburg to Lisbon, Portugal. |
| Peggy | United Kingdom | The brig was driven ashore and wrecked south of Great Yarmouth. Her crew were rescued. |
| Sarpen | Denmark | The ship was driven ashore between Cuxhaven and Otterndorf. |
| Unnamed | United Kingdom | The ship was driven ashore between Cuxhaven and Otterndorf. |
| Unnamed | Flag unknown | The ship was driven ashore between Cuxhaven and Otterndorf. |

=== 4 November ===
List of shipwrecks: 4 November 1801
| Ship | State | Description |
|---|---|---|
| Good Intent | United Kingdom | The ship was driven ashore at Corton, Suffolk. |
| Margaret | United Kingdom | The ship was driven ashore at Great Yarmouth, Norfolk. Her crew were rescued. |
| Peggy | United Kingdom | The ship was wrecked at Covehithe, Suffolk. Her crew were rescued. She was on a voyage from Hull, Yorkshire, to London. |
| Polly | United Kingdom | The ship foundered in the Baltic Sea with the loss of five of her crew. Survivors were rescued by a Swedish brig on 9 November. |
| Roebuck | United Kingdom | The ship was driven ashore in Clovelley Bay. She was on a voyage from Bideford, Devon to Poole, Dorset. She was subsequently repaired and returned to service. |
| Sarah | United Kingdom | The ship was wrecked on the Casquets, off the Channel Islands with the loss of three of her crew. She was on a voyage from London to Surinam. |
| Unnamed | United Kingdom | The transport ship was wrecked in Tramore Bay with the loss of more than 300 lives. |

=== 5 November ===
List of shipwrecks: 5 November 1801
| Ship | State | Description |
|---|---|---|
| Caroline | Flag unknown | The ship was wrecked on the Île de Batz, Finistère, France with the loss of all but one of her crew. |
| Esperance | United Kingdom | The brig struck Nut Rock, in the Isles of Scilly and was a total loss, after parting her cables during a south-west gale. Her crew were rescued. She was bound for Venice from Penzance, Cornwall, with pilchards. |
| Hope | United Kingdom | The ship was driven ashore and severely damaged on Aruba. She was on a voyage from Trinidada to Curaçao. |

=== 7 November ===
List of shipwrecks: 9 November 1801
| Ship | State | Description |
|---|---|---|
| Morning Star | United Kingdom | The ship was driven ashore on Saltholm, Denmark, while on a voyage from Leith, Lothian, to Danzig. She was later refloated and taken in to Copenhagen, Denmark. |

=== 9 November ===
List of shipwrecks: 9 November 1801
| Ship | State | Description |
|---|---|---|
| HMS Friendship | Royal Navy | The gunboat was coming into Plymouth to be paid off when she went on shore on Portland and was lost. Her crew was saved. |

=== 10 November ===
List of shipwrecks: 10 November 1801
| Ship | State | Description |
|---|---|---|
| Middleton | United Kingdom | The ship was driven ashore in Balmanghan Bay, Wigtownshire. Her crew were rescued. She was on a voyage from Wiscasset, Maine, United States, to Kirkcudbright, Wigtownshire. |

=== 14 November ===
List of shipwrecks: 14 November 1801
| Ship | State | Description |
|---|---|---|
| Peggy | United Kingdom | The ship was driven ashore and wrecked at Covehithe, Suffolk. Her crew were rescued. She was on a voyage from Hull, Yorkshire to London. |

=== 16 November ===
List of shipwrecks: 16 November 1801
| Ship | State | Description |
|---|---|---|
| Lord Duncan | United Kingdom | Lord Duncan was at Smyrna when lightning struck her. She suffered considerable damage. |

=== 17 November ===
List of shipwrecks: 17 November 1801
| Ship | State | Description |
|---|---|---|
| Friendship | United States | The ship departed New York for Tenerife, Canary Islands, Spain. No further trace, presumed foundered in the Atlantic Ocean with the loss of all hands. |
| Lord Nelson | United Kingdom | The ship was driven ashore near "Swartart", Prussia. |

=== 19 November ===
List of shipwrecks: 19 November 1801
| Ship | State | Description |
|---|---|---|
| Firm | United Kingdom | The ship was wrecked on Anticosti Island, Nova Scotia, British North America. Her crew were rescued. She was on a voyage from Quebec City, Lower Canada, British North America, to Madeira. |

=== 20 November ===
List of shipwrecks: 20 November 1801
| Ship | State | Description |
|---|---|---|
| Colworth | United Kingdom | The ship was driven ashore and severely damaged at Padstow, Cornwall. She was on a voyage from London to Venice. |
| Harmonie | Lübeck | The ship departed from Lübeck for Reval, Russia. No further trace, presumed foundered in the Baltic Sea with the loss of all hands. |

=== 21 November ===
List of shipwrecks: 21 November 1801
| Ship | State | Description |
|---|---|---|
| Venus | United Kingdom | The ship was wrecked near Thurso, Caithness while on a voyage from Narva, Russia, to Liverpool, Lancashire. |

=== 22 November ===
List of shipwrecks: 22 November 1801
| Ship | State | Description |
|---|---|---|
| Neptunus | Prussia | The ship was wrecked on Eierland, North Holland, Batavian Republic. She was on a voyage from London, United Kingdom, to Emden. |
| Nordlicht | Hamburg | The ship was wrecked on the Dutch coast while on a voyage from Charleston, South Carolina, United States, to Altona. There were no survivors. |
| Vrouw Anna | Batavian Republic | The ship was driven ashore and wrecked on the Dutch coast while on a voyage from London, United Kingdom, to Amsterdam, North Holland. |

=== 23 November ===
List of shipwrecks: 23 November 1801
| Ship | State | Description |
|---|---|---|
| Dash | United Kingdom | The ship was wrecked near the Vlie with the loss of five of her crew. She was on a voyage from Memel, Prussia to Hull, Yorkshire. |
| Pallas | Stettin | The ship was lost on the Flemish coast of France with the loss of fourteen lives. She was on a voyage from Stettin to London, United Kingdom. |

=== 24 November ===
List of shipwrecks: 24 November 1801
| Ship | State | Description |
|---|---|---|
| Orion | United Kingdom | The ship foundered in the North Sea. Her crew were rescued. She was on a voyage from Pillau, Prussia, to Newcastle upon Tyne, Northumberland. |

=== 25 November ===
List of shipwrecks: 25 November 1801
| Ship | State | Description |
|---|---|---|
| Adeona | United Kingdom | The snow ran aground on The Shingles, off the Isle of Wight. Her five passengers were taken off. She was on a voyage from Quebec City, Lower Canada, British North America to Cowes, Isle of Wight. |
| Aurora | United Kingdom | The ship was lost on the north west coast of Ireland. She was on a voyage from Newfoundland, British North America to the Clyde. |

=== 27 November ===
List of shipwrecks: 27 November 1801
| Ship | State | Description |
|---|---|---|
| Duke of Clarence | United Kingdom | The ship was driven ashore at Deal, Kent. She was on a voyage from London to Saint Kitts. Duke of Clarence was refloated in December and taken in to Ramsgate, Kent. |
| Elizabeth | United Kingdom | The smack capsized at Dover, Kent. Her four crew were rescued. |
| Hope | United Kingdom | The brig was driven ashore at Trondheim, Norway. |
| Lion | United Kingdom | The ship was driven ashore at Trondheim. |
| Peace and Plenty | United Kingdom | The sloop foundered in the North Sea off the Dutch coast. Her crew were rescued. She was on a voyage from Danzig to Alloa, Ayrshire. |
| Sophia Magdalena | Sweden | The East Indiaman was driven ashore and wrecked at Deal. She was on a voyage from China to a Swedish port. |
| Three Sisters | United Kingdom | The ship was driven ashore at Trondheim. |
| Unnamed | Hamburg | The brig drove into Duke of Clarence (United Kingdom) and sank off Deal with the loss of all but one of her crew, and three Dover men, who were assisting the ship. She was on a voyage from Hamburg to Tenerife, Canary Islands. |

=== 28 November ===
List of shipwrecks: 28 November 1801
| Ship | State | Description |
|---|---|---|
| Dumfries | United Kingdom | The sloop capsized at Liverpool, Lancashire. Her crew were rescued. |

=== 29 November ===
List of shipwrecks: 29 November 1801
| Ship | State | Description |
|---|---|---|
| Argo | United Kingdom | The ship was driven ashore in Plymouth Sound. She was on a voyage from . |
| Betsey | United Kingdom | The collier was wrecked near Christchurch, Hampshire with the loss of all but one of her seven crew. |
| Blenheim | United Kingdom | The ship was driven ashore near Danzig. She was on a voyage from London to Danzig. |
| Elizabeth | United Kingdom | The brig was driven ashore in Plymouth Sound. She was on a voyage from Newfoundland to Plymouth. She was refloated on 4 December. |
| Endeavour | United Kingdom | The ship was driven ashore near Stolpemünde. She was on a voyage from Saint Petersburg, Russia, to London |
| Friendship | United Kingdom | The ship was driven ashore and wrecked at Great Yarmouth, Norfolk. Her crew were rescued. |
| Hannah | United Kingdom | The ship was driven ashore near Danzig. She was on a voyage from Riga, Russia, to London. |
| Harmony | United Kingdom | The ship foundered in the Baltic Sea while on a voyage from Danzig to Kirkcaldy, Forfarshire. |
| Heureux | United Kingdom | The brig was driven ashore and wrecked in Plymouth Sound. She was on a voyage from St. John's, Newfoundland to Plymouth. |
| Lord Nelson | United Kingdom | The sloop was driven ashore and wrecked at Birchington, Kent, with the loss of all four crew. She was on a voyage from Sandwich, Kent, to London. |
| Lord Salton | United Kingdom | The ship was driven ashore and wrecked at Pakefield, Suffolk. Her crew were rescued. She was on a voyage from Aberdeen to Sunderland, County Durham. |
| Mary and Betsey | United Kingdom | The snow was driven ashore and wrecked in Plymouth Sound. She was on a voyage from St. John's to Plymouth. |
| Unnamed | Flag unknown | The ship was wrecked on the Shipwash Sand, in the North Sea off the coast of Suffolk. All on board were rescued by a Barking smack. |
| 10 unnamed vessels | Flags unknown | The ships were driven ashore within 20 nautical miles (37 km) of Stolpemünde. |

=== 30 November ===
List of shipwrecks: 30 November 1801
| Ship | State | Description |
|---|---|---|
| Aberdeen Merchant | United Kingdom | The ship ran aground on Scroby Sands, Norfolk and was abandoned by her crew. She was later refloated and taken in to Great Yarmouth, Norfolk. |
| Hebe | United Kingdom | The ship was severely damaged by fire at Burntisland, Fife. |
| Unnamed | United Kingdom | The brig was driven ashore and wrecked in Firestone Bay, Devon. She was on a voyage from St. John's to Dartmouth, Devon. |

=== Unknown date ===
List of shipwrecks: Unknown date in November 1801
| Ship | State | Description |
|---|---|---|
| Admiral Laforey | United Kingdom | The ship was driven ashore and wrecked at Shoeburyness, Essex. Her crew were rescued. She was on a voyage from Portsmouth, Hampshire, to London. |
| Adventure | United Kingdom | The ship was driven ashore on Öland, Sweden. She was on a voyage from Saint Petersburg, Russia, to Hull, Yorkshire. Adventure was later refloated and taken in to Kalmar, Sweden. |
| Albion | United Kingdom | The ship was driven ashore and wrecked at Great Yarmouth, Norfolk, with the loss of all hands. She was on a voyage from Newcastle upon Tyne, Northumberland, to London. |
| Alexander | United Kingdom | The ship was driven ashore at Holyhead, Anglesey. |
| Alexis | United Kingdom | The ship was driven ashore at Dublin. She was on a voyage from Greenock, Renfrewshire, to Virginia, United States. |
| Amity | United States | The ship foundered during November. She was on a voyage from La Rochelle, Charente-Maritime to Virginia. |
| Ann | United Kingdom | The ship was driven ashore at Dublin. |
| Anna Sophia | Stettin | The ship was driven ashore in the Baltic. She was on a voyage from London to Stettin. |
| Arrow | United Kingdom | The ship was wrecked on the Arklow Bank, in the Irish Sea off County Wicklow. She was on a voyage from Martinique to Waterford and Liverpool, Lancashire. |
| Aurora | Danzig | The ship was driven ashore near Boulogne, Pas-de-Calais, France. She was on a voyage from Plymouth, Devon, United Kingdom, to Danzig. |
| Benevolence | United Kingdom | The ship was driven ashore at Marshchapel, Lincolnshire. She was later refloated. |
| Catherine | United States | The ship was wrecked at Dunkerque, Nord, France. |
| Ceres | United Kingdom | The ship was driven ashore at Memel. |
| Charles and Elizabeth | United Kingdom | The ship was driven ashore and damaged at Walmer Castle, Kent. She was on a voyage from Newcastle upon Tyne to Cádiz, Spain. She was refloated and taken in to Ramsgate, Kent. |
| Christian | United Kingdom | The ship was driven ashore near Margate. |
| Christian | United Kingdom | The ship capsized in the Baltic Sea. Her crew were rescued. She was on a voyage from Memel to Workington, Cumberland. |
| Cybille | Prussia | The ship was driven ashore at Malmö, Sweden. She was on a voyage from London to Königsberg. |
| Diligence | United Kingdom | The ship was driven ashore at Memel. |
| Dolphin | United Kingdom | The ship was lost near Elsinore. Her crew were rescued. |
| Dolphin | United Kingdom | The ship was driven ashore on Bornholm, Denmark. Her crew were rescued. She was on a voyage from Memel to London. |
| Earl Falkenburg | United Kingdom | The ship was driven ashore at Memel. |
| Edward | United Kingdom | The ship was driven ashore at Memel. |
| Eliza | United Kingdom | The ship was driven ashore at Memel. |
| Elizabeth | United Kingdom | The ship was driven ashore at Southwold, Suffolk. She was on a voyage from King's Lynn, Norfolk, to London. |
| Elizabeth Sarah | United Kingdom | The ship was driven ashore at Memel. |
| Enterprize | United Kingdom | The ship was driven ashore at Memel. |
| Esperance | United Kingdom | The ship was wrecked in the Isles of Scilly. She was on a voyage from Penzance, Cornwall, to Venice. |
| Expedition | United Kingdom | The ship was driven ashore at Memel. |
| Four Friends | Hamburg | The ship ran aground on the Goodwin Sands, Kent. She was on a voyage from Hamburg to Lisbon Portugal. She was refloated with assistance and taken in to The Downs. |
| Friendelyke | Batavian Republic | The ship was driven ashore at Gravelines, Nord, France. She was on a voyage from Rotterdam, South Holland to London. |
| Friendship | United Kingdom | The ship was wrecked on the Dutch coast with the loss of three of her crew. She was on a voyage from Arkhangelsk, Russia, to London. |
| George & Mary | United Kingdom | The ship was driven ashore at Saltfleet, Lincolnshire. Her crew were rescued. |
| Good Agreement | United Kingdom | The ship was driven ashore at Scarborough, Yorkshire. She was later refloated and taken in to South Shields, County Durham. |
| Guildford | United Kingdom | The ship was driven ashore at Memel. She was later refloated. |
| Gustaff | Sweden | The ship was wrecked near Skagen, Denmark. She was on a voyage from Gefle to London. |
| Handscombe | United Kingdom | The ship was wrecked at Morlaix, Ille-et-Vilaine, France while on a voyage from London to Lisbon, Portugal. |
| Hawke | United Kingdom | The ship was driven ashore and wrecked at Whitstable, Kent. She was on a voyage from Weymouth, Dorset, to London. |
| Hercules | United States | The ship was driven ashore at Scharhaven, near Bremen. She was on a voyage from New York to Bremen. |
| Heveluis | Stettin | The ship was driven ashore near Boulogne. She was on a voyage from Plymouth to Stettin. |
| Hope | United Kingdom | The ship was driven ashore and wrecked at Lowestoft, Suffolk. |
| John | United Kingdom | The transport ship was wrecked at Marseille, Bouches-du-Rhône, France. |
| John and Sally | United Kingdom | The ship was wrecked off Blakeney, Norfolk. She was on a voyage from London to King's Lynn. |
| John and Sally | United Kingdom | The ship was driven ashore and wrecked at Herne Bay, Kent. She was on a voyage from Southampton, Hampshire, to London. Her crew were rescued. |
| Jonge Frouyn | Flag unknown | The ship departed from Bilbao, Spain, for London. No further trace, presumed foundered with the loss of all hands. |
| Juffrouw Dirkje | Batavian Republic | The ship foundered off Norderney, Kingdom of Hanover. |
| Juno | Prussia | The ship was driven ashore at Memel. She was later refloated. |
| Laus Deo | Danzig | The ship was driven ashore at Calais, France, while on a voyage from Plymouth to Danzig. |
| Lee Lea | United Kingdom | The ship was driven ashore and wrecked at Ramsgate, Kent. She was on a voyage from London to Malta. |
| Lord Solton | United Kingdom | The ship was driven ashore and wrecked at Lowestoft. She was on a voyage from Aberdeen to Sunderland, County Durham. |
| Louisa | Stettin | The ship was lost near "Folkenburg". She was on a voyage from London to Stettin. |
| Lovely Nelly | United Kingdom | The ship was driven ashore and wrecked near Ventava, Courland Governorate. She was on a voyage from London to Memel. She was later refloated. |
| Manchester | United Kingdom | The ship was lost in the Baltic Sea. Her crew were rescued. She was on a voyage from Memel to London. |
| Margaret | United Kingdom | The ship was driven ashore at Great Yarmouth, Norfolk. She was on a voyage from Great Yarmouth to Hull. |
| Margarets | United Kingdom | The ship was lost. She was on a voyage from the Clyde to Honduras. |
| Mary | United Kingdom | The ship was driven ashore at Memel. |
| Medway | United Kingdom | The ship was driven ashore at Memel. |
| Nancy | United Kingdom | The ship was wrecked on the Welsh coast. She was on a voyage from Jersey, Channel Islands, to a Welsh port. |
| Nancy | United Kingdom | The sloop was driven ashore at Marshchapel. She was on a voyage from Newcastle upon Tyne to London. She was later refloated and taken in to Hull. |
| Ocean | United Kingdom | The ship was driven ashore near Cuxhaven, Kingdom of Hanover. She was on a voyage from Hull to Hamburg. |
| Palladium | United Kingdom | The ship was driven ashore at Memel. |
| Peggy | United Kingdom | The ship ran aground at Cardigan. She was on a voyage from Bristol, Gloucestershire, to Liverpool. Lancashire. |
| Penguin | United Kingdom | The ship was wrecked at Biddiford, Devon. She was on a voyage from Newfoundland to Barnstaple, Devon. |
| Polly | United Kingdom | The tender was driven ashore and wrecked at Plymouth, Devon. Her crew were rescued. She was refloated on 23 November and taken in to Plymouth. |
| Providence | United Kingdom | The ship was driven ashore near Dunkerque, Nord. Her crew were rescued. She was on a voyage from Saint Petersburg to London. |
| Robs & Betsey | United States | The ship was driven ashore and damaged in the Cattewater. She was later refloated. |
| Supply | United Kingdom | The ship was abandoned in the Irish Sea. She was on a voyage from Liverpool to Gibraltar. She was subsequently taken in to Tenby, Pembrokeshire. |
| Three Friends | United Kingdom | The ship was wrecked on the coast of the Courland Governorate while on a voyage from Riga, Russia, to Portsmouth, Hampshire. |
| Union | United Kingdom | The ship was driven ashore at Memel. She was later refloated. |
| Urania | United Kingdom | The ship was driven ashore at Memel. She was later refloated and taken in to Copenhagen, Denmark. |
| HMS Utile | Royal Navy | The ship foundered while on a voyage from Gibraltar to Minorca. |
| Venus | United Kingdom | The ship was driven onto the Nayland Rock, Margate, Kent. She was refloated with assistance. |
| HM Hired armed ship William and Lucy | Royal Navy | The gunboat foundered in the English Channel. |
| Yarmouth | United Kingdom | The ship was wrecked off Skagen, Denmark. |

== December ==
=== 1 December ===
List of shipwrecks: 1 December 1801
| Ship | State | Description |
|---|---|---|
| Unnamed | United Kingdom | The brig was driven ashore at the mouth of the River Ribble, Lancashire. |

=== 2 December ===
List of shipwrecks: 2 December 1801
| Ship | State | Description |
|---|---|---|
| Aurora | United Kingdom | The ship was driven ashore south of Scarborough, Yorkshire. Her seven crew were rescued by the Scarborough Lifeboat. |
| Ocean | United Kingdom | The ship was struck by lightning in the Atlantic Ocean 10 leagues (30 nautical miles (56 km)) west of Tory Island, County Donegal, and destroyed by fire. Her crew were rescued by Hero (United Kingdom). She was on a voyage from the Clyde to Demerara. |
| Unnamed | United Kingdom | The lighter foundered in Plymouth Sound. She was on a voyage from Plymouth, Devon to Cawsand Bay. |

=== 4 December ===
List of shipwrecks: 4 December 1801
| Ship | State | Description |
|---|---|---|
| Argo | United Kingdom | The ship was wrecked on Spurn Point, Yorkshire. She was on a voyage from Sunderland, County Durham, to Gibraltar. |
| Resolution | United Kingdom | The ship was wrecked on the Black Middens, off South Shields, County Durham. |
| 28 unnamed vessels | Flags unknown | The ships were driven ashore and wrecked at Riga, Russia. |

=== 5 December ===
List of shipwrecks: 5 December 1801
| Ship | State | Description |
|---|---|---|
| Swallow | United Kingdom | The ship was driven ashore and wrecked at Saltfleet, Lincolnshire, with the loss of all hands. She was on a voyage from Great Yarmouth, Norfolk, to Gainsborough, Lincolnshire. |

=== 6 December ===
List of shipwrecks: 6 December 1801
| Ship | State | Description |
|---|---|---|
| Rising Sun | United States | The ship departed Charleston, South Carolina, for Cádiz, Spain. No further trace, presumed foundered in the Atlantic Ocean with the loss of all hands. |
| Unnamed | United Kingdom | The ship was wrecked off Peveril Point, Dorset with the loss of all five crew. |

=== 9 December ===
List of shipwrecks: 9 December 1801
| Ship | State | Description |
|---|---|---|
| Abraham Newland | United Kingdom | The schooner was driven ashore and wrecked at Plymouth, Devon, with the loss of a crew member. She was on a voyage from Lisbon, Portugal to Topsham, Devon. |
| Sisters | United Kingdom | The ship was wrecked in the Isles of Scilly with the loss of two of her crew. She was on a voyage from Newfoundland, British North America to Poole, Dorset. |
| Unnamed | United Kingdom | The lighter foundered in Plymouth Sound with the loss of both crew. She was on a voyage from Plymouth to Cawsand Bay. |

=== 11 December ===
List of shipwrecks: 11 December 1801
| Ship | State | Description |
|---|---|---|
| Juliana | Prussia | The ship was wrecked on Bornholm, Denmark, while on a voyage from Memel to Dublin. |

=== 12 December ===
List of shipwrecks: 12 December 1801
| Ship | State | Description |
|---|---|---|
| Christian Septimus | Denmark-Norway | The ship was wrecked on the Anholt Reef while on a voyage from Batavia, Batavian East Indies to Copenhagen. |
| M'George | United Kingdom | The sloop was driven ashore and wrecked near Kirkandrews, Wigtownshire. Her crew were rescued. |
| Three Friends | United Kingdom | The ship was wrecked near Ventava, Courland Governorate with the loss of two of her crew. She was on a voyage from Riga, Russia to London. |

=== 13 December ===
List of shipwrecks: 13 December 1801
| Ship | State | Description |
|---|---|---|
| Felicity | United States | The ship was lost near Fécamp, Seine-Inférieure, France. She was on a voyage from Baltimore, Maryland to Fécamp. |
| Hostigeman | Sweden | The ship was abandoned at sea. Her crew were rescued by Anna ( Danzig). Hostigeman was on a voyage from Hull, Yorkshire, United Kingdom to Gothenburg. |

=== 14 December ===
List of shipwrecks: 14 December 1801
| Ship | State | Description |
|---|---|---|
| Caroline | United Kingdom | The ship was lost on the Dutch coast. Her crew were rescued. she was on a voyage from Riga, Russia, to Amsterdam, North Holland, Batavian Republic. |
| Ellerbeck | United Kingdom | The ship was lost in the Vlie. She was on a voyage from Naples, Kingdom of Sicily, to Emden, Prussia. |
| Story & Jane | United Kingdom | The ship was wrecked on the Falsterbo Reef, in the Baltic Sea off the coast of Sweden. |

=== 15 December ===
List of shipwrecks: 15 December 1801
| Ship | State | Description |
|---|---|---|
| Eagle | United States | The ship was wrecked on the Maranzies Reef while on a voyage from Havana, Cuba, to Philadelphia, Pennsylvania. Her crew were rescued. |

=== 17 December ===
List of shipwrecks: 17 December 1801
| Ship | State | Description |
|---|---|---|
| Jupiter | Hamburg | The ship was wrecked on the Dutch coast while on a voyage from Hamburg to Antwerp, Deux-Nèthes, France. |
| Peggy | United Kingdom | The ship was lost near Huntly, Aberdeenshire. |

=== 23 December ===
List of shipwrecks: 23 December 1801
| Ship | State | Description |
|---|---|---|
| Newby | United Kingdom | The ship foundered while on a voyage from Surinam to Liverpool, Lancashire. Her crew were rescued by Fame and Nymph (both United Kingdom). |

=== 24 December ===
List of shipwrecks: 24 December 1801
| Ship | State | Description |
|---|---|---|
| Cicero | United States | The sloop foundered in the Atlantic Ocean. Her crew were rescued by Lady Nelson ( (United Kingdom of Great Britain and Ireland) Guernsey). |

=== 25 December ===
List of shipwrecks: 25 December 1801
| Ship | State | Description |
|---|---|---|
| Betsey | United Kingdom | The ship was lost near Pittenweem, Fife, with the loss of a crew member. |

=== 26 December ===
List of shipwrecks: 26 December 1801
| Ship | State | Description |
|---|---|---|
| British Queen | United Kingdom | The ship collided with the pier at Bridlington, Yorkshire, and was wrecked. Her crew were rescued. She was on a voyage from London to Bridlington. |
| Perseverance | United Kingdom | The ship foundered in the River Humber. Her crew were rescued. She was on a voyage from Southwold, Suffolk, to Hull, Yorkshire. |

=== Unknown date ===
List of shipwrecks: Unknown date in December 1801
| Ship | State | Description |
|---|---|---|
| Aaske | Flag unknown | The ship was driven ashore. She was later refloated. |
| Abraham Newland | United Kingdom | The ship foundered in the English Channel off Topsham, Devon, with the loss of a crew member. She was on a voyage from Lisbon, Portugal, to Plymouth, Devon. |
| Acorn | United Kingdom | The ship was driven ashore near Kirkwall, Orkney Islands. Her crew were rescued. She was on a voyage from Riga, Russia, to Liverpool, Lancashire. |
| African Queen | United Kingdom | The whaler was driven ashore in the Bristol Channel. She was on a voyage from the South Seas to London African Queen was later refloated and taken in to Newport, Monmouthshire. |
| Alexander | United Kingdom | The ship was driven ashore at Holyhead, Anglesey. |
| Amphion | United Kingdom | The ship was wrecked off Öregrund, Sweden. She was on a voyage from Hernosand, Sweden, to Hull, Yorkshire. |
| Ann | United Kingdom | The ship was wrecked on the coast of Zeeland, Batavian Republic. She was on a voyage from Dram, Norway, to Dublin. |
| Argo | United Kingdom | The ship was wrecked at Barbuda. |
| Arrogant | Portugal | The ship was driven ashore at Plymouth. She was on a voyage from Porto to Rochefort, Charente-Maritime, France. |
| Betsey | United Kingdom | The ship was wrecked on the coast of Lincolnshire while on a voyage from Rye, Sussex, to Sunderland, County Durham. She was later refloated and taken in to Hull. |
| Betsey and Susan | United Kingdom | The ran aground on the Swine Bottoms. She was on a voyage from Saint Petersburg, Russia to Arbroath, Forfarshire. She was refloated. |
| Bonwick | United Kingdom | The ship ran aground on the Goodwin Sands, Kent. She was on a voyage from Demerara to London. She was refloated and taken in to Ramsgate, Kent. |
| Britannia | United Kingdom | The ship was driven ashore and wrecked near Padstow, Cornwall. |
| Britannia | United Kingdom | The ship was wrecked on Bornholm, Denmark, while on a voyage from Saint Petersburg, Russia, to London. |
| Brook Watson | United Kingdom | The ship was wrecked on the Gunfleet Sands, in the North Sea off the coast of Essex. |
| Catrina | Flag unknown | The ship was driven ashore. She was later refloated. |
| Cæsar | United Kingdom | The ship was wrecked on Breaksea Point, Glamorgan, while on a voyage from Bristol, Gloucestershire, to St. Croix, Virgin Islands. Two of her crew were lost. |
| Cæsar | United Kingdom | The ship was wrecked on the Dutch coast while on a voyage from Sunderland to Rotterdam, South Holland, Batavian Republic. |
| Carolina | United Kingdom | The ship was wrecked at Kirkwall, Orkney Islands, while on a voyage from Pernau, Livonia, Russian Empire, to Liverpool. |
| Catherina Augusta | Lübeck | The ship was lost while on a voyage from Lübec to Saint Petersburg. |
| Charles | United Kingdom | The ship was lost at Riga. |
| Chesapeak | United States | The ship ran aground on the Drimple Sand, in the North Sea off the Dutch coast and was abandoned by her crew. She was on a voyage from Falmouth, Cornwall, United Kingdom, to Amsterdam, North Holland, Batavian Republic. Chesapeak was later refloated and taken in to Den Helder, North Holland. |
| Cicero | United States | The ship was driven ashore at Cuxhaven, Kingdom of Hanover while on a voyage from Baltimore, Maryland, to Hamburg. |
| Clara | Batavian Republic | The ship was wrecked on Bornholm, Denmark, while on a voyage from Saint Petersburg to Amsterdam. |
| Commerce | United Kingdom | The ship was wrecked on the Dutch coast while on a voyage from Norway to Plymouth. Only two of her crew survived. |
| Cornish Oak | United Kingdom | The ship was driven ashore and wrecked near Padstow. |
| Dædalus | United Kingdom | The ship was wrecked on Bornholm. Her crew were rescued.She was on a voyage from Saint Petersburg to London. |
| Delham Tower | United Kingdom | The ship foundered in Holyhead Bay. |
| Dobraya Nadeshda | Russia | The ship foundered in the White Sea while on a voyage from Arkhangelsk to Portugal. |
| Eerstrom | Batavian Republic | The ship was wrecked on the Dutch coast while on a voyage from Arkhangelsk, Russia, to Amsterdam. |
| Eliza | United Kingdom | The ship was driven ashore and wrecked at Kirkwall. Her crew were rescued. She was on a voyage from Arkhangelsk to Dublin. |
| Elizabeth | United Kingdom | The ship was lost near Amsterdam with the loss of all but one of her crew. She was on a voyage from Newcastle upon Tyne, Northumberland, to Amsterdam. |
| Flora | Flag unknown | The ship was wrecked on the Swine Bottoms, in the Baltic Sea. She was on a voyage from Oulu, Grand Duchy of Finland to Plymouth. |
| Flora | United Kingdom | The ship ran aground on the Brake Sand, in the North Sea off the coast of Essex. She was refloated and taken in to Ramsgate, Kent. |
| Florissant | Prussia | The ship ran aground off Sandwich, Kent, United Kingdom.She was on a voyage from Danzig to Liverpool. She was set afire and destroyed on 21 January 1802. |
| Fortitude | United Kingdom | The ship sprang a leak in the North Sea while on a voyage from Hamburg to Hull and was abandoned by her crew. |
| Fortuna | Bremen | The ship was driven ashore on the coast of Jutland. She was on a voyage from Málaga, Spain to Bremen. |
| Friendelyke | Batavian Republic | The ship was driven ashore at Gravelines, Nord, France. |
| George | United States | The ship was wrecked on the Banyard Bank, in the North Sea off the coast of Lys, France. |
| Good Friends | United Kingdom | The ship was driven ashore at Great Yarmouth, Norfolk. She was on a voyage from Norway to Bristol. |
| Good Intent | United Kingdom | The ship was driven ashore and wrecked at Dieppe, Seine-Inférieure, France while on a voyage from Rye, Sussex, to Dieppe. |
| Grinder | United Kingdom | The ship was driven ashore and wrecked near Padstow. |
| Hannah | United Kingdom | The ship was driven ashore and wrecked on the Stoney Binks, off the mouth of the River Humber while on a voyage from Sunderland, County Durham, to Gibraltar. |
| Hoffnung | Hamburg | The ship was wrecked near Rotterdam, South Holland, Batavian Republic, while on a voyage from Hamburg to Senegal. |
| Hoffnung | Flag unknown | The ship was lost at Stavanger, Norway. She was on a voyage from London to Riga. |
| Holderness | United Kingdom | The ship was driven ashore and wrecked at Pillau, Prussia. |
| Hope | United Kingdom | The ship foundered while on a voyage from Bahamas to British Honduras. Her crew were rescued. |
| Hunter | United Kingdom | The ship was driven ashore on the Kohl. She was on a voyage from Saint Petersburg to Montrose, Forfarshire. She was refloated. |
| Industry | United Kingdom | The brig was destroyed by fire in the Bay of Fundy. She was on a voyage from the Clyde to Halifax, Nova Scotia and Saint John, New Brunswick, British North America. |
| Iris | United Kingdom | The ship was driven ashore and wrecked at Pillau. |
| James and Mary | United Kingdom | The stores ship foundered while on a voyage from Poole, Dorset, to Hull. Her crew were rescued by the storeship Camel (United Kingdom). |
| Jane | United Kingdom | The ship was lost at Memel, Prussia. |
| Jean | United Kingdom | The ship was driven ashore. She was later refloated and taken in to Hull. |
| John | United Kingdom | The ship was wrecked on Bornholm. Her crew were rescued. She was on a voyage from Saint Petersburg to Whitehaven, Cumberland. |
| Juffrow Hermina | Batavian Republic | The ship was driven ashore at Hellevoet, Zeeland. She was on a voyage from Rotterdam, South Holland to London. |
| Junius | United Kingdom | The ship was driven ashore and wrecked near Elsinore, Denmark. |
| Lancaster | United Kingdom | The ship foundered in the Baltic Sea off Danzig with the loss of five of her crew. She was on a voyage from Danzig to Lancaster, Lancashire. She was later refloated and put into "Fairwater" for repairs. |
| Louisa Konigen von Prussen | Danzig | The ship was wrecked at Dunkerque, Nord, France while on a voyage from London to Danzig. |
| Louise | Denmark-Norway | The ship was lost near Brielle, South Holland, Batavian Republic. |
| Margaret | Batavian Republic | The ship was lost near Brielle while on a voyage from Riga to Rotterdam, South Holland. |
| Mariam | United Kingdom | The ship was wrecked on Bornholm, Denmark, while on a voyage from Saint Petersburg to Grangemouth, Stirlingshire. |
| Mary | United Kingdom | The ship was driven ashore and wrecked near Poole. She was on a voyage from London to Faial Island, Azores. |
| Mary | United Kingdom | The ship ran aground on the Sandwich Flats, Kent. She was on a voyage from Seville, Spain to London. She was refloated and taken in to Ramsgate. |
| Minerva | United Kingdom | The ship foundered in the North Sea while on a voyage from Liverpool to Danzig. |
| Minerva | United Kingdom | The ship was driven ashore at the Île de Ré, Charente-Maritime, France. She was on a voyage from Mount's Bay to Naples, Kingdom of Sicily. |
| Nancy | United Kingdom | The brig struck a rock off Lady Isle. She was wrecked by a storm on 22 January 1802. |
| Navigator | United Kingdom | The ship was driven ashore on Bornholm. Her crew were rescued. She was on a voyage from Riga to Dundee, Forfarshire. |
| Neptunus | Danzig | The ship was wrecked on the Dutch coast while on a voyage from Danzig to Liverpool. |
| Ortgiese | Flag unknown | The ship was driven ashore. She was later refloated. |
| Padstow | United Kingdom | The ship was wrecked near Padstow. |
| Padstow | United Kingdom | The ship ran aground on the Swine Bottoms. She was later refloated and taken in to Landskrona, Sweden for repairs. |
| Palm Baum | United Kingdom | The ship sank at Ramsgate. She was on a voyage from Barcelona, Spain, to London. |
| Parthenia | United Kingdom | The ship was lost off Hogland, Russia. Her crew were rescued. She was on a voyage from Saint Petersburg to London. |
| Pathenis | United Kingdom | The ship was wrecked on Stoneskar, Russia. Her crew were rescued. She was on a voyage from Saint Petersburg to London. |
| Peggy | United Kingdom | The ship was wrecked on the coast of the Courland Governorate. |
| Rio Douro | Portugal | The ship was driven ashore near Lymington, Hampshire, United Kingdom. She was on a voyage from Porto to Newcastle upon Tyne. Rio Douro was later refloated and taken in to Cowes, Isle of Wight, United Kingdom. |
| Samaritan | United Kingdom | The ship was driven ashore on Saltholm. She was refloated. |
| Sarah | United Kingdom | The ship was wrecked at Riga with the loss of eleven of her crew. She was on a voyage from Liverpool to Riga. |
| Seaflower | United Kingdom | The sloop was wrecked at Milford Haven, Pembrokeshire. Her crew were rescued. She was on a voyage from Bridgwater, Somerset, to Cork. |
| Spansenburg | Kingdom of Hanover | The ship was driven ashore. She was later refloated. |
| Stadt Copenhagen | Denmark | The ship was lost on the Flemish coast of France. She was on a voyage from Plymouth to a Norwegian port. |
| St. George | United Kingdom | The ship foundered in the North Sea off Den Helder, North Holland, Batavian Republic, while on a voyage from Smyrna, Ottoman Empire, to Amsterdam. |
| Swallow | United Kingdom | The ship was driven ashore at Marazion, Cornwall. She was on a voyage from Gorey, Jersey, Channel Islands, to London. |
| Tartar | United Kingdom | The brig was driven ashore and wrecked at West Cowes, Isle of Wight. |
| Triton | Hamburg | The ship was wrecked on the Dutch coast while on a voyage from Hamburgh to Bordeaux, Loire-Inférieure, France. |
| Union | United Kingdom | The ship was wrecked on the Dutch coast while on a voyage from Boston, Lincolnshire, to London. |
| Unity | United Kingdom | The ship was wrecked at Narva, Russia. |
| Walsingham | United Kingdom | The ship was wrecked near Bideford, Devon, with the loss of all but four of her crew. She was on a voyage from Malta to Falmouth, Cornwall. |
| Welcome | United Kingdom | The ship foundered in the Baltic Sea. She was on a voyage from Danzig to London. |
| William | United Kingdom | The ship was wrecked on the Swine Bottoms. She was on a voyage from Saint Petersburg to Padstow. |
| William Pitt | United Kingdom | The ship was wrecked on the Dutch coast. She was on a voyage from Fredrikstad, Norway, to Weymouth, Dorset. |
| Zeevaart | Batavian Republic | The ship was wrecked on the Dutch coast with the loss of all hands. She was on a voyage from Arkhangelsk to Amsterdam. |
| Unnamed | United States | The brig was driven ashore and went to pieces at Naples, Kingdom of the Two Sicilies sometime in December, 1801 or before 11 January, 1802, but possibly on 21 December. |
| Unnamed | Ottoman Tripolitania | The corvette sailed from Tripoli on 19 December and loss, with all but 10 hands, known by 25 December. |
| Unnamed | (Ottoman Empire) Ottoman Greece | The polacre was driven ashore at Naples, Kingdom of the Two Sicilies sometime if December, 1801 or before 11 January, 1802, but possibly on 21 December. |
| Two unnamed vessels | flags unknown | The ships were driven ashore at Kirkwall. |
| Unnamed | Stettin | The ship was driven ashore near Landskrona, Sweden. She was on a voyage from Stettin to London. |
| Unnamed | United Kingdom | The collier was driven ashore between Birchington and Margate, Kent. |
| Unnamed | United Kingdom | The ship was driven ashore and wrecked in Riga Bay with the loss of all but three or four of her crew. |
| Five unnamed vessels | Flags unknown | The ships were driven ashore on the Dutch coast. |
| Eight unnamed vessels | Flags unknown | The ships were driven ashore and wrecked at Pillau. |
| Unnamed | Flag unknown | The brig was abandoned at sea. She was subsequently taken in to Ramsgate. |

== Unknown date ==
List of shipwrecks: Unknown date in 1801
| Ship | State | Description |
|---|---|---|
| Adriana | United Kingdom | The ship was sunk by ice in the Delaware River, United States. She was on a voyage from Philadelphia, Pennsylvania, to Dublin. |
| Albion | United Kingdom | The ship was lost at Tortola, Virgin Islands before 8 September. She was on a voyage from Montserrat to London. |
| Alexander | United Kingdom | The ship ran aground and was wrecked off British Honduras while bound for London. Her crew were rescued. |
| Anna Maria | Hamburg | The ship was lost at Senegal. She was on a voyage from Hamburg to Senegal. |
| Aurora | United Kingdom | The ship was wrecked on the coast of British Honduras. |
| Benjamin | United Kingdom | The ship was lost in Trinity Bay, Newfoundland, British North America. Her crew were rescued. |
| Betsey | United Kingdom | The ship foundered off the Virginia Capes, United States. She was on a voyage from Liverpool, Lancashire, to Virginia. |
| Britannia | United Kingdom | The ship was lost at [Old Harbour, Jamaica, while on a voyage from Jamaica to London. |
| Catherine | United Kingdom | The ship exploded off the Bonny Bar with the loss of all but eight of her crew. She was on a voyage from Africa to the West Indies. |
| Chance | United Kingdom | The ship was wrecked at Barbados. |
| Columbia | United States | The ship foundered in the Grand Banks of Newfoundland while on a voyage from Philadelphia, Pennsylvania, to London. Her crew were rescued by Lydia (United Kingdom). |
| Dalrymple | United Kingdom | The ship sank in the St. Lawrence River while on a voyage from Barbados to Quebec, Lower Canada, British North America. |
| Diana | United Kingdom | The ship was lost on the Bonny Bar. Her crew were rescued by Lord Stanley and Will (both United Kingdom). |
| Dove | United Kingdom | The ship foundered in the Atlantic Ocean off the coast of the United States. Her crew were rescued. |
| Earl of Liverpool | United Kingdom | The ship was driven ashore on the coast of Surinam. |
| Earl Spencer | United Kingdom | The whaler was wrecked at South Georgia Island in late 1801 or early 1802. Her crew were rescued. |
| Ebenezer | United Kingdom | The ship ran aground off Bermuda. |
| Eensgerindheyd | Batavian Republic | The ship was driven ashore at the Cape of Good Hope. She was on a voyage from the Cape of Good Hope to Surinam. |
| Eliza | United States | The ship foundered in the Atlantic Ocean off the coast of Florida(approximately 29°N 82°W) while on a voyage from Jamaica to New York. |
| El Paysano | Spain | The ship foundered off St. Andreas with the loss of all hands. She was on a voyage from the Spanish Main to Jamaica. |
| Endeavour | United States | The ship was wrecked on Long Island, Antigua. She was on a voyage from North Carolina to Crooked Island, Bahamas. |
| Experiment | United States | The ship was crushed by ice and sunk at New Castle, New Hampshire |
| Enterprize | United Kingdom | The ship was wrecked at Surinam. Her crew were rescued. |
| Fanny | United Kingdom | The East Indiaman foundered while on a voyage from Madras, India, to the Cape of Good Hope. |
| Galen | United Kingdom | The ship was wrecked on the coast of British Honduras. |
| George | United Kingdom | The ship was driven ashore at New Providence, New Jersey, United States. |
| Gudgeon | United Kingdom | The ship was destroyed by fire at Jamaica. She was on a voyage from Jamaica to Quebec. |
| Hannah | United States | The ship was lost off the Caicos Islands. She was on a voyage from Philadelphia, Pennsylvania, to Jamaica. |
| Harriot | United Kingdom | War of the Second Coalition: The ship was captured by a Spanish frigate. She was subsequently wrecked on the Spanish Main. Harriot was on a voyage from London to Demerara. |
| Harvey | United Kingdom | The ship was lost in the Bay of Bulls. |
| Hero | United Kingdom | The ship was lost at Jamaica. |
| Hope | United States | The ship was lost off the Caicos Islands. She was on a voyage from Philadelphia, Pennsylvania, to Jamaica. |
| Hope | United Kingdom | The ship was wrecked at Martinique. She was on a voyage from London to Tortola. |
| Hope | United Kingdom | The ship was lost whilst on a voyage from the Bahamas to British Honduras. |
| Industry | United Kingdom | The ship sank in the St Lawrence River while on a voyage from Quebec to Leith, Lothian. |
| Johanna | United Kingdom | The ship was driven ashore on the coast of British Honduras. She was on a voyage from London to British Honduras. |
| Joseph | United Kingdom | The ship was wrecked on the coast of British Honduras. |
| Lady Milford | United Kingdom | The ship ran aground on a reef off Savannah-La-Mar, Jamaica and ten of the crew abandoned her. She was on a voyage from Jamaica to London. |
| La Liberté | France | The privateer was wrecked on Sumatra with some loss of life. |
| Lavinia | Flag unknown | The ship was lost near Tortola before 15 September. She was on a voyage from Tortola to Quebec. |
| Letter | United Kingdom | The ship was lost at Newfoundland. |
| Little John | United States | The ship foundered off Jamaica. |
| Liverpool Hero | United Kingdom | The ship foundered off Surinam. |
| Love | United Kingdom | The ship was lost at Grenada. She was on a voyage from Whitehaven, Cumberland, to Grenada. |
| Lydia | United States | The ship was destroyed by fire at sea. |
| Mary | United Kingdom | The ship was abandoned in the Atlantic Ocean. Her crew were rescued by Hope (United Kingdom). Mary was on a voyage from Charleston, South Carolina, United States, to an Irish port. |
| Mary Ann | United States | The ship foundered off Bermuda. She was on a voyage from New York to Montserrat. |
| Mary Ann | United Kingdom | The ship foundered while on a voyage from Surinam to Liverpool. Her crew were rescued by Esther (United Kingdom). |
| Madona | United Kingdom | The ship was wrecked at Martinique. |
| Mermaid | India | The ship struck a rock and sank 2 nautical miles (3.7 km) off Diamond Island, Myanmar. Her crew were rescued. |
| Montgomery | United Kingdom | The ship foundered while on a voyage from New York to Liverpool. Her crew were rescued. |
| Monticello | United States | The ship foundered off Cape Cod, Massachusetts. |
| Moreland | United Kingdom | The ship was destroyed by fire at Salt River, Jamaica. |
| Nancy | United Kingdom | The whaler was crushed by ice and sunk off the coast of Greenland. |
| Norval | United Kingdom | The ship was driven ashore near Demerara. She was on a voyage from London to Demerara. |
| Oak | United Kingdom | War of the Second Coalition: The ship was captured by a French squadron and was scuttled. She was on a voyage from Gibraltar to Mogadore, Morocco and London. |
| Pacific | United Kingdom | The ship was wrecked at Martinique. She was on a voyage from London to Martinique. |
| Packers | United States | The ship was lost near Sable Island, Nova Scotia, British North America. Her crew were rescued. She was on a voyage from Boston, Massachusetts, to Liverpool. |
| Paramaribo | United States | The ship was driven ashore near Sandy Hook. She was on a voyage from New York to Londonderry. |
| Patriot | United Kingdom | The ship was wrecked at Charleston, South Carolina, while on a voyage from British Honduras to London. |
| Proteus | United Kingdom | The ship foundered while on a voyage from Surinam to London. Her crew were rescued. |
| Queen | United Kingdom | The ship was driven ashore on the Weather Bank, Demerara. She was on a voyage from London to Demerara. |
| Rebecca | United Kingdom | The ship was driven ashore at Tobago. |
| Sally | United Kingdom | The brig foundered in the Atlantic Ocean while on a voyage from Jamaica to Dublin. Her crew were rescued by Peggy (United States). |
| St. Antonio | Portugal | The ship was abandoned by her crew while on a voyage from Porto to Dublin. They were rescued by Criterion (United Kingdom). |
| Santo Marlyres Triumpo Pinto | Portugal | The ship foundered at Rio de Janeiro while on a voyage from Lisbon to Montevideo, Brazil. |
| Speedwell | United Kingdom | The ship foundered in the Atlantic Ocean. Her crew were rescued. She was on a voyage from Waterford to Newfoundland. |
| Spitfire | United Kingdom | The ship was wrecked on the African coast. Her crew were rescued. She was on a voyage from Bombay, India, to the Red Sea. |
| Suffolk | United States | The ship was wrecked on the Virginia Capes while on a voyage from New York to Virginia. |
| Supply | United Kingdom | The ship ran aground on Mohairs Key, off New Providence, New Jersey United States. She was on a voyage from British Honduras to London. |
| Susan and Sally | United Kingdom | The ship foundered while on a voyage from Dartmouth, Devon, to Newfoundland. |
| Susannah | United Kingdom | The ship was wrecked near Jeddah, Ottoman Empire sometime before 24 June. She was on a voyage from New York to Londonderry. |
| Sv. Arkhistrati Mikhail | Russia | The vessel was lost with all hands at Unalaska Island in the Catherine Archipelago. |
| Swallow | United Kingdom | The ship was run down and sunk by Lord Duncan (United Kingdom). Her crew were rescued by Lord Duncan. She was on a voyage from Newfoundland to Dartmouth. |
| Thomas | United Kingdom | The ship was lost at New York. She was on a voyage from New York to Londonderry. |
| Traveller | United States | The ship was wrecked on Long Island while on a voyage from the West Indies to Boston, Massachusetts. |
| Union | United Kingdom | The ship sprang a leak and was abandoned off Saint Kitts. She was on a voyage from Demerara to Liverpool. |
| HMS Vengeance | Royal Navy | The 38-gun fifth rate ran aground, suffering damage. After she was refloated, she became a receiving ship. |
| Washington | United States | The ship foundered while on a voyage from Virginia to Rotterdam, South Holland, Batavian Republic. |
| Washington Packet | United States | The ship foundered in the Atlantic Ocean while on a voyage from New York to London. |
| Withywood | United Kingdom | The ship was in collision with another vessel and sank off Jamaica. She was on a voyage from British Honduras to London. |
