= Sir Sidney Smith (ship) =

Two British ships have been named Sir Sidney Smith (or Sidney Smith, or Sir Sydney Smith), after Admiral Sidney Smith:

- Governor Simcoe (1793 ship), a British merchant vessel launched in 1793, taken over by the Royal Navy and renamed Sir Sidney Smith (alternatively spelled Sir Sydney Smith) in 1813 during the War of 1812
- Sir Sidney Smith (1799 ship), was a French vessel taken in prize in 1799. She served the Royal Navy for two years during the French Revolutionary Wars as a hired armed schooner. She then became a merchantman, sailing to the Mediterranean, the Baltic, and the West Indies. She was last listed in 1814.
- Sir Sidney Smith (1802 ship), was a British merchantman launched 1802 in Dover and captured in 1812
- Sir Sidney Smith, of 114 tons (bm), was launched at Cowes in 1807. She was a West Indiaman. She sank on 28 February 1810 at Port Royal, Jamaica after having arrived in a leaky state.

== See also ==
- Sidney Smith (disambiguation)
- Sydney Smith (disambiguation)
