= Sid Smith =

Sid Smith may refer to:

== Sports ==
- Sid Smith (boxer) (1889–1948), English flyweight boxer
- Sid Smith (footballer, born 1890) (1890–1952), Australian rules footballer
- Sid Smith (American football coach) (1912–2006), American football coach
- Sid Smith (ice hockey) (1925–2004), Canadian ice hockey player
- Sid Smith (footballer, born 1928) (1928–1985), Australian rules footballer
- Sid Smith (offensive lineman) (born 1948), American football player
- Sid Smith (lacrosse) (born 1986), Canadian Iroquois lacrosse player

== Others ==
- Sid Smith (politician) (1893–1981), New Zealand member of parliament
- Sid Smith (actor) (1894–1928), American actor
- Sid Smith (music writer), English freelance writer on music
- Sid Smith (novelist) (born c. 1949), English novelist and journalist

== See also ==
- Syd Smith (disambiguation)
- Sidney Smith (disambiguation)
- Sydney Smith (disambiguation)
