= Syd Smith =

Syd Smith may refer to:

- Syd Smith (baseball) (1883–1961), American baseball player
- Syd Smith (Australian footballer) (1888–1954), Australian rules footballer who played for Fitzroy in 1919
- Syd Smith (footballer, born 1895) (1895–?), English footballer who played for Derby County, Norwich City and Gillingham in the 1920s

== See also ==
- Sid Smith (disambiguation)
- Sidney Smith (disambiguation)
- Sydney Smith (disambiguation)
