= Sidney Smith =

Sidney Smith may refer to:

== Law and politics ==
- Sidney Smith (politician, born 1823) (1823–1889), lawyer and politician in Upper Canada
- Sidney Earle Smith (1897–1959), Canadian university president and Secretary of State for External Affairs
- Sidney Oslin Smith Jr. (1923–2012), United States federal judge

== Sports ==
- Sidney Smith (snooker player) (1908–1990), English billiards and snooker player
- Sidney Smith (cricketer) (1929–1985), English cricketer

== Others ==
- Sir Sidney Smith (Royal Navy officer) (1764–1840) British admiral
- Sidney Smith (1809–1880), member of the Peoria Party
- Sidney Irving Smith (1843–1926), American zoologist
- Sidney Lawton Smith (1845–1929), American designer, illustrator and bookplate artist
- Sidney R. J. Smith (1858–1913), English architect
- Sidney Maynard Smith (1875–1928), British surgeon and freemason
- Sidney Smith (cartoonist) (1877–1935), American cartoonist
- Sidney Smith (Assyriologist) (1889–1979), British Assyriologist
- Sir Sidney Smith (ship), a list of ships by that name

== See also ==
- Sid Smith (disambiguation)
- Syd Smith (disambiguation)
- Sydney Smith (disambiguation)
