= Sydney Smith (disambiguation) =

Sydney Smith (1771–1845) was an English writer and clergyman.

Sydney or Sidney Smith may also refer to:

== Arts and literature ==
- Sydney Smith (composer) (1839–1889), English composer
- Sydney Wigham Smith (c. 1866–1933), Australian architect
- Sydney Ure Smith (1887–1949), Australian arts publisher and promoter
- Sydney Goodsir Smith (1915–1975), New Zealand-born Scottish poet and artist
- Sydney Bernard Smith (1936–2008), Scots-Irish poet, dramatist, actor and novelist
- Sydney Smith (illustrator) (fl. 2010s–2020s), Canadian illustrator

== Law and politics ==
- Sydney Smith (Australian politician) (1856–1934), Australian politician
- Sydney M. Smith (1869–1948), Chief Justice of the Supreme Court of Mississippi
- Sydney George Smith (c. 1879–1943), New Zealand politician
- Sydney Smith (British politician) (1885–1984), Labour MP for Hull South West, 1945–1950
- Sydney John Smith (1892–1976), Canadian politician

== Military ==
- Sidney Smith (Royal Navy officer) (1764–1840), British naval officer and politician
- Sydney Ernest Smith (1881–1943), English pioneer aviator, soldier and company director
- Sydney Philip Smith (1896–1918), British World War I flying ace

== Sports ==
- Sydney Howard Smith (1872–1947), British badminton and tennis player
- Sydney Smith (cricketer, born 1881) (1881–1963), Trinidad and Tobago cricketer who played for West Indies and New Zealand
- Sydney Smith (cricketer, born 1892), English cricketer

== Others ==
- S. Talbot Smith (Sydney Talbot Smith, 1861–1948), lawyer and journalist in South Australia.
- Sir Sydney Smith (pathologist) (1883–1969), New Zealand-born Scottish forensic pathologist
- Sir Sidney Smith (ship), a list of ships by that name, including ships named "Sir Sydney Smith"

== See also ==
- Syd Smith (disambiguation)
- Sidney Smith (disambiguation)
- Sid Smith (disambiguation)
