= Admiral Laforey (1797 ship) =

British merchant ship 1797–1801

History

Great Britain
- Name: Admiral Laforey
- Namesake: Admiral John Laforey
- Owner: 1797:Brickwood; 1801:Deverin; 1802:Dixon & Co.
- Acquired: 1797 by purchase of a prize
- Fate: Wrecked 1801

General characteristics
- Tons burthen: 261, or 271 (bm)
- Propulsion: Sail
- Armament: 1798:2 × 9-pounder guns; 1802:6 × 4-pounder guns

Admiral Laforey was a French prize captured in 1796 that entered Lloyd's Register in 1797 with R. Smith, master, and Brickwood, owner. She originally sailed between London and Martinique. She then became a London-based transport in 1800, and her master became J. Henderson. Her owner became Deverin, and then Dixon by 1801 when she was lost. Lloyd's List reported on 3 November 1801 that she had been lost at Shoeburyness while on her way from Portsmouth to London. Crew and material had been saved. Her entry in the Register of Shipping for 1802 is marked "LOST".
