= HMS Friendship (1795) =

Two British gunboats (both 1795–1801)

History

Great Britain
- Name: HMS Friendship
- Acquired: 1795 by purchase
- Fate: Lost in November 1801

General characteristics
- Armament: 2-3 guns

The British Royal Navy purchased two vessels in 1795, both named HMS Friendship. Both were lost in November 1801. The parallels in names and dates has resulted in the two vessels, and their fates, probably being conflated.

Friendship #1: Master A.Chapman commissioned Friendship in September 1796. In 1800 she was under the command of W.Cartwright.

The gun-boat Friendship #1 was coming into Plymouth to be paid off when she went on shore on Portland and was lost. Her crew was saved.

Friendship #2: Master J.Richardson commissioned Friendship in September 1796. She was a Thames sailing barge that the British Royal Navy used as a gun-vessel of two or three guns. The sailing barges had a crew of 19 men, generally under the command of a sailing master.

Two sources report that she was under the command of Lieutenant Peter Rigby when she was wrecked at near Saint-Malo on 9 November 1801. This vessel was probably Friendship #1.

The Naval Chronicle reported in the news for Plymouth of 24 November on the loss of Friendship #2. A gale on 2 November 1801 had driven Friendship, Lieutenant Ashley, out to sea from Guernsey Roads. When she hadn't been heard from for several weeks it was supposed that she had been lost and Ashley's family went into deep mourning. However, on 24 November letters reached Plymouth from HMS Bravo, Commodore Philippe d'Auvergne, at Jersey that Lieutenant Ashley and his crew had arrived at Jersey on 15 November. Friendship had gone ashore near Saint-Malo and when the tide went out, the crew had walked ashore. The local French Commandant marched them some two miles inland where they were held for ten days in a barn with plenty of straw for bedding. The French then conveyed them to Jersey in an open boat under a flag of truce; they were expected to return to Plymouth on the next vessel from Jersey.
