= Sir Sidney Smith (1799 ship) =

British naval schooner and merchantman 1799–1814

History

Great Britain
- Name: Sir Sidney Smith
- Namesake: Admiral Sidney Smith
- Launched: France
- Acquired: 1799 as a prize
- In service: 12 October 1799
- Out of service: 13 October 1801

United Kingdom
- Name: Sir Sidney Smith
- Acquired: 1801 by purchase
- Fate: Last listed in 1814

General characteristics
- Tons burthen: 15131/94, or 160, or 166 (bm)
- Armament: Royal Navy: 12 × 12-pounder carronades; Mercantile service: 2 × 4-pounder guns

Sir Sidney Smith (or Sidney Smith, or Sir Sydney Smith) was a French vessel taken in prize in 1799. She served the Royal Navy for two years during the French Revolutionary Wars as a hired armed schooner. She then became a merchantman, sailing to the Mediterranean, the Baltic, and the West Indies. She was last listed in 1814.

== Career ==
Sir Sydney Smith's contract with the Royal Navy lasted from 12 October 1799 to 13 October 1801 AD.

She brought a convoy into Plymouth on 15 October 1799.

On 10 May 1801 she arrived at Plymouth from Jamaica. Then, on 24 May, while under the command of Lieutenant C. Patey (or Paty or Paloy), she sailed from Plymouth with dispatches for Egypt. On her voyage she stopped at Oporto, and returned to Portsmouth on 3 July.On 16 July a storm at Portsmouth caused extensive damage to her.

On 9 October, Sir Sidney Smith, Petrie, master, arrived at Falmouth from Egypt.

Because Sir Sidney Smith had served in the navy's Egyptian campaign (8 March to 2 September 1801 AD), her officers and crew qualified for the clasp "Egypt" to the Naval General Service Medal, which the Admiralty issued in 1847 AD to all surviving claimants.

After the navy ended Sir Sidney Smith's contract, she appeared in the 1801 volume of Lloyd's Register (LR). The entry described her as a ship of 160 tons (bm) that had been raised and received a new deck in 1801. The register also described her as a French prize.

Year	Master	Owner	Trade	Source & notes
1801	S.Partridge	White	London–Falmouth	LR; raised and new deck 1801
1801	Partridge	White	London–Falmouth; Liverpool–Newfoundland	LR; raised and new deck 1801

In March 1802 Lloyd's List reported that Sir Sidney Smith, Partridge, master, had arrived at Venice, from London. By July she had arrived at Hoylake from Patras.

On 2 December 1803 Sir Sidney Smith was reported to have to have arrived at Portsmouth from Memel.

Year	Master	Owner	Trade	Source & notes
1806	Partridge; C.Liddle	White	Liverpool–Newfoundland; London–Demerara	LR; raised and new deck 1801
1809	C.Liddle; Coffery (or Caffry)	White	London–Demerara	LR; raised and new deck 1801

Later, her trade became London–Hayti.
