= National Register of Historic Places listings in Forest County, Pennsylvania =

Location of Forest County in Pennsylvania

This is a list of the National Register of Historic Places listings in Forest County, Pennsylvania.

This is intended to be a complete list of the properties and districts on the National Register of Historic Places in Forest County, Pennsylvania, United States. The locations of National Register properties and districts for which the latitude and longitude coordinates are included below, may be seen in a map.

There are 5 properties and districts listed on the National Register in the county.

This National Park Service list is complete through NPS recent listings posted April 24, 2026.

== Current listings ==
	Name on the Register	Image	Date listed	Location	City or town	Description
1	Cook Forest State Park Indian Cabin District	Cook Forest State Park Indian Cabin District	February 12, 1987 (#87000019)	Off Pennsylvania Route 36 at Cooksburg; 41°20′02″N 79°12′32″W	Barnett Township	Extends into Clarion County
2	Cook Forest State Park River Cabin District	Cook Forest State Park River Cabin District	February 12, 1987 (#87000053)	Off Pennsylvania Route 36 at Cooksburg; 41°19′37″N 79°11′30″W	Barnett Township	
3	Anthony Wayne Cook Mansion	Anthony Wayne Cook Mansion	June 19, 1979 (#79002226)	River Drive; 41°19′52″N 79°12′20″W	Barnett Township	
4	Shunk Farm		April 27, 2026 (#100012946)	15255 Route 666; 41°34′26″N 79°17′46″W	Tionesta	
5	West Hickory Bridge	West Hickory Bridge	June 22, 1988 (#88000835)	Pennsylvania Route 127 over the Allegheny River at West Hickory; 41°34′11″N 79°24′21″W	Harmony and Hickory Townships	Destroyed and replaced with a new bridge

== See also ==
- List of National Historic Landmarks in Pennsylvania
- National Register of Historic Places listings in Pennsylvania
- List of Pennsylvania state historical markers in Forest County
