= Pennsylvania Route 36 =

State highway in Pennsylvania, US

Pennsylvania Route 36
- Route of PA 36 highlighted in red

Route information
- Maintained by PennDOT
- Length: 151.1 mi (243.2 km)

Major junctions
- South end: PA 26 in Hopewell Township
- US 22 in Hollidaysburg; US 220 Bus. in Altoona; US 219 in Mahaffey; US 119 in Punxsutawney; US 322 / PA 28 in Brookville; I-80 in Brookville; US 62 in Tionesta
- North end: PA 27 / PA 227 in Pleasantville

Location
- Country: United States
- State: Pennsylvania
- Counties: Bedford, Blair, Cambria, Clearfield, Indiana, Jefferson, Clarion, Forest, Venango

Highway system
- Pennsylvania State Route System; Interstate; US; State; Scenic; Legislative
← PA 35	→ PA 37
← PA 859	→ PA 861

Pennsylvania Route 36 (PA 36) is a 151.12 mi (243.2 km) long state highway located in the U.S. state of Pennsylvania. The southern terminus is at PA 26 near the Hopewell Township community of Yellow Creek. The northern terminus is at PA 27/PA 227 in Pleasantville.

One of the longest and oldest highways in the commonwealth, PA 36 serves as a major connector between South Central and Northwestern Pennsylvania. In 1955, the highway was designated as the Colonel Drake Highway in honor of Edwin Drake.

== Route description ==
=== Bedford and Blair counties ===
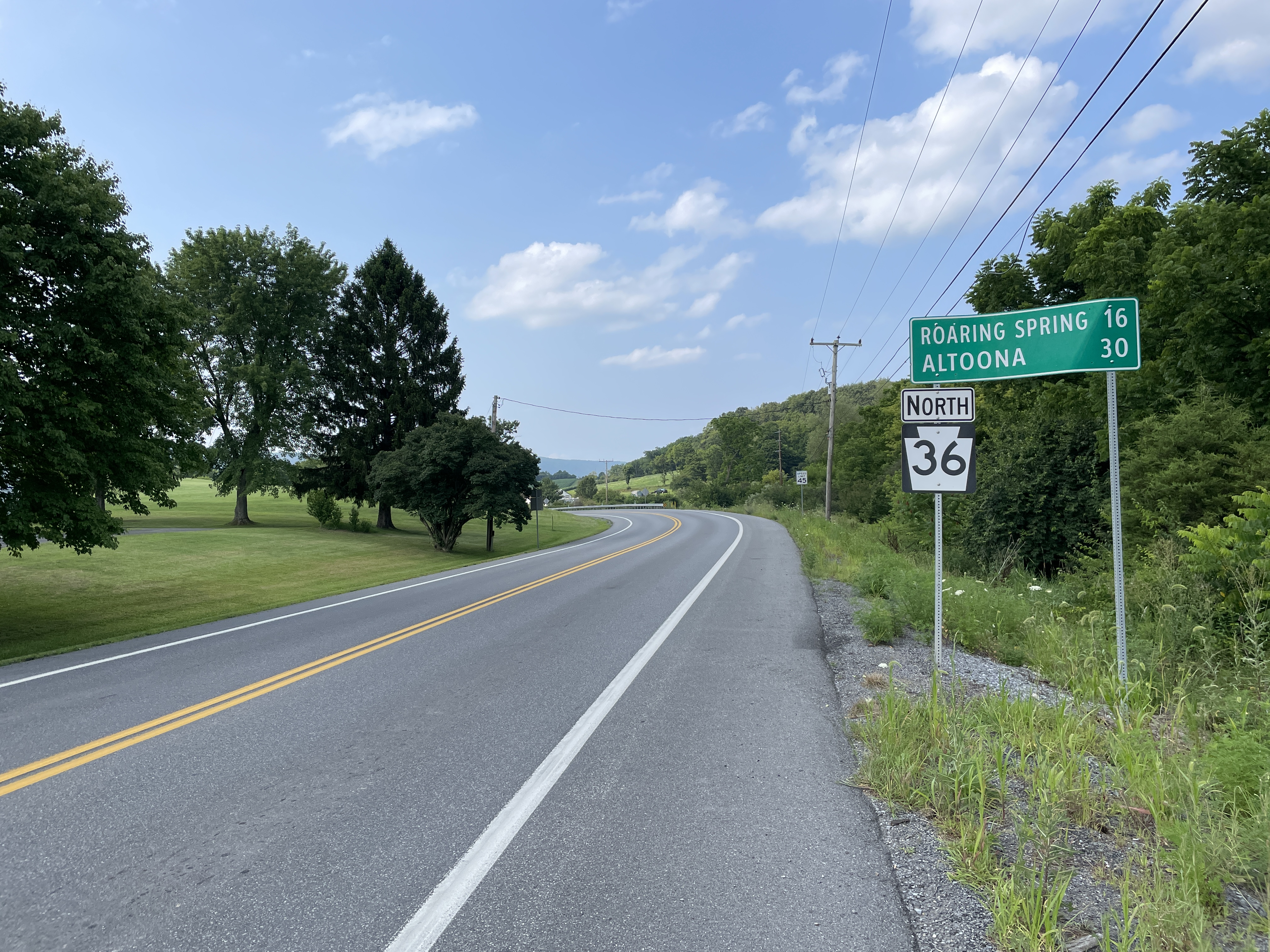
PA 36 northbound past PA 26 in Hopewell Township

PA 36 begins in the Bedford County hamlet of Yellow Creek at PA 26 along the Tussey Mountain range.

The distance in Bedford County is brief as the highway enters Blair County and proceeds northward as the Woodbury Pike, intersecting several 800-series state highways like PA 866, PA 868, and PA 869. A short distance between Roaring Spring and the hamlet of McKee, PA 36 overlaps the east–west running PA 164. North of McKee, PA 36 becomes Catfish Ridge Road, closely paralleling the Frankstown Branch Juniata River to the west, and the Interstate 99–U.S. Route 220 overlap to the east along the Brush Mountain range.

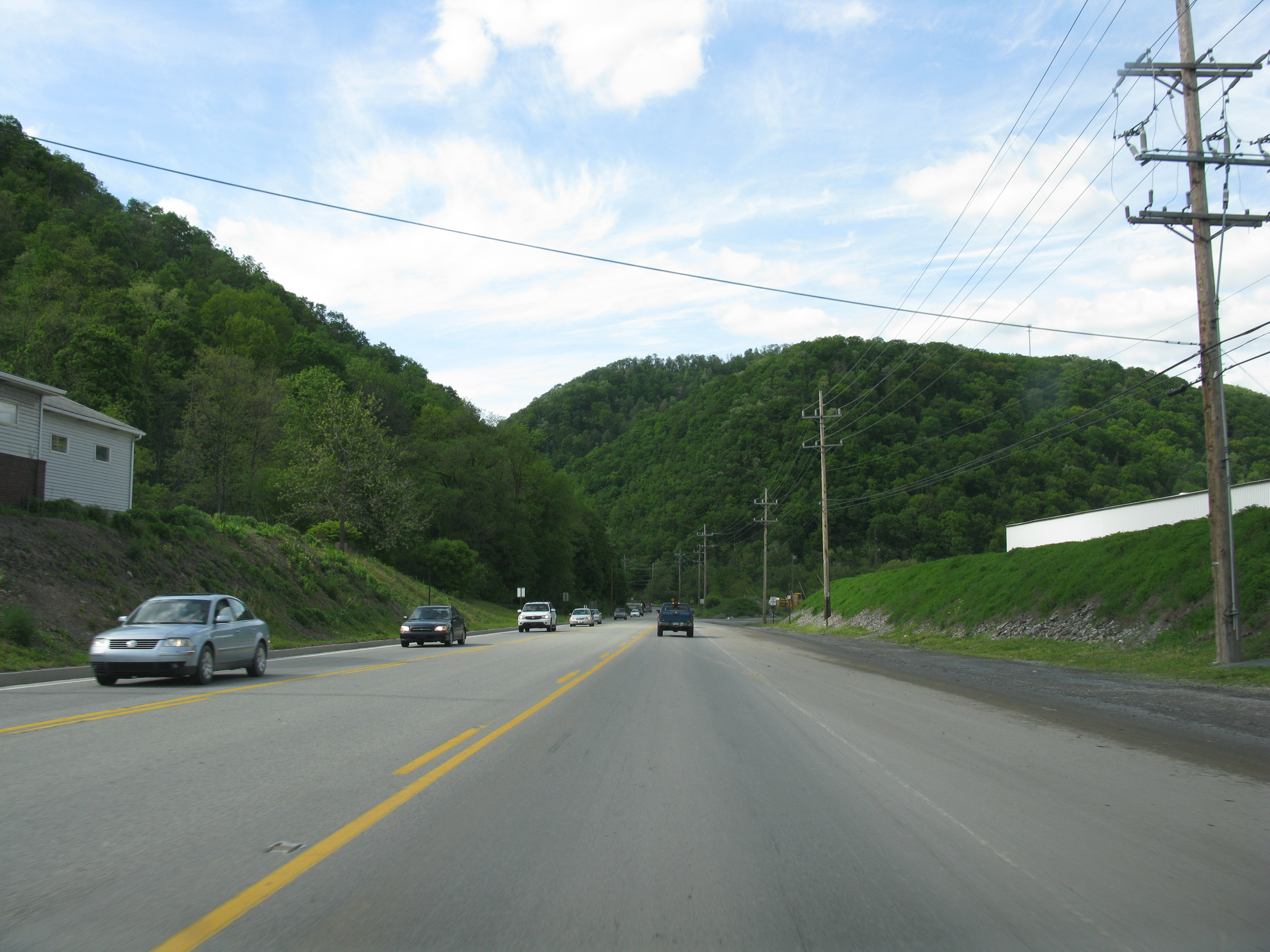
PA 36 just north of the intersection with PA 867 in Taylor Township, just outside Roaring Spring.

Just south of Hollidaysburg, PA 36 has the only interchange with a non-freeway highway, Smith Road. North of Smith Road, PA 36 enters the borough as Logan Boulevard and intersects U.S. Route 22 in downtown at Blair Street. North of Hollidaysburg, PA 36 as Logan Boulevard becomes a major 4-lane divided arterial, serving the southern suburbs of Altoona.

North of the I-99/US 220 underpass, PA 36 enters the city of Altoona. The route briefly overlaps U.S. Route 220 Business along West Plank Road. North of the overlap, PA 36 traverses the downtown areas of the city via Union Avenue and 18th street. Running on a west direction, 18th Street leads PA 36 out of Altoona, into the Appalachian Mountains and rural areas.

=== Cambria, Clearfield, and Jefferson counties ===
Near the Cambria County line, PA 36 has the first of five wrong-way concurrencies with PA 53 for a block in the hamlet of Ashville. West of the hamlet, PA 36 proceeds on a northwest direction into Clearfield County. Between the county line and the village of Mahaffey, PA 36 mostly runs parallel on the eastern banks of the Chest Creek. From Mahaffey to McGees Mills, PA 36 is overlapped with U.S. Route 219 along the northern banks of the West Branch Susquehanna River.

The highway runs through Indiana County, passing through its far northeastern portion, for less than one mile (1.6 km). Briefly after entering Jefferson County, PA 36 takes a predominantly western course. PA 36 traverses the borough of Punxsutawney as Main and Mahoning Streets while intersecting the Buffalo-Pittsburgh highway (U.S. Route 119) and PA 436, a spur of 36. Outside the borough, PA 36 intersects another spur, PA 536, before taking a more northern alignment.

In Brookville, PA 36 has a three-route concurrency with U.S. Route 322 and PA 28 along Main Street. North of the overlap, PA 36 becomes Allegheny Boulevard while interchanging Interstate 80 at exit 78. North of Brookville, PA 36 runs mostly on a northern course. In the northwestern sections of the county, the road intersects PA 949 in Sigel and PA 899 near Clear Creek State Park. PA 36 exits the county running west along the southern tips of the Clarion River in Cook Forest State Park.

=== Clarion, Forest, and Venango counties ===
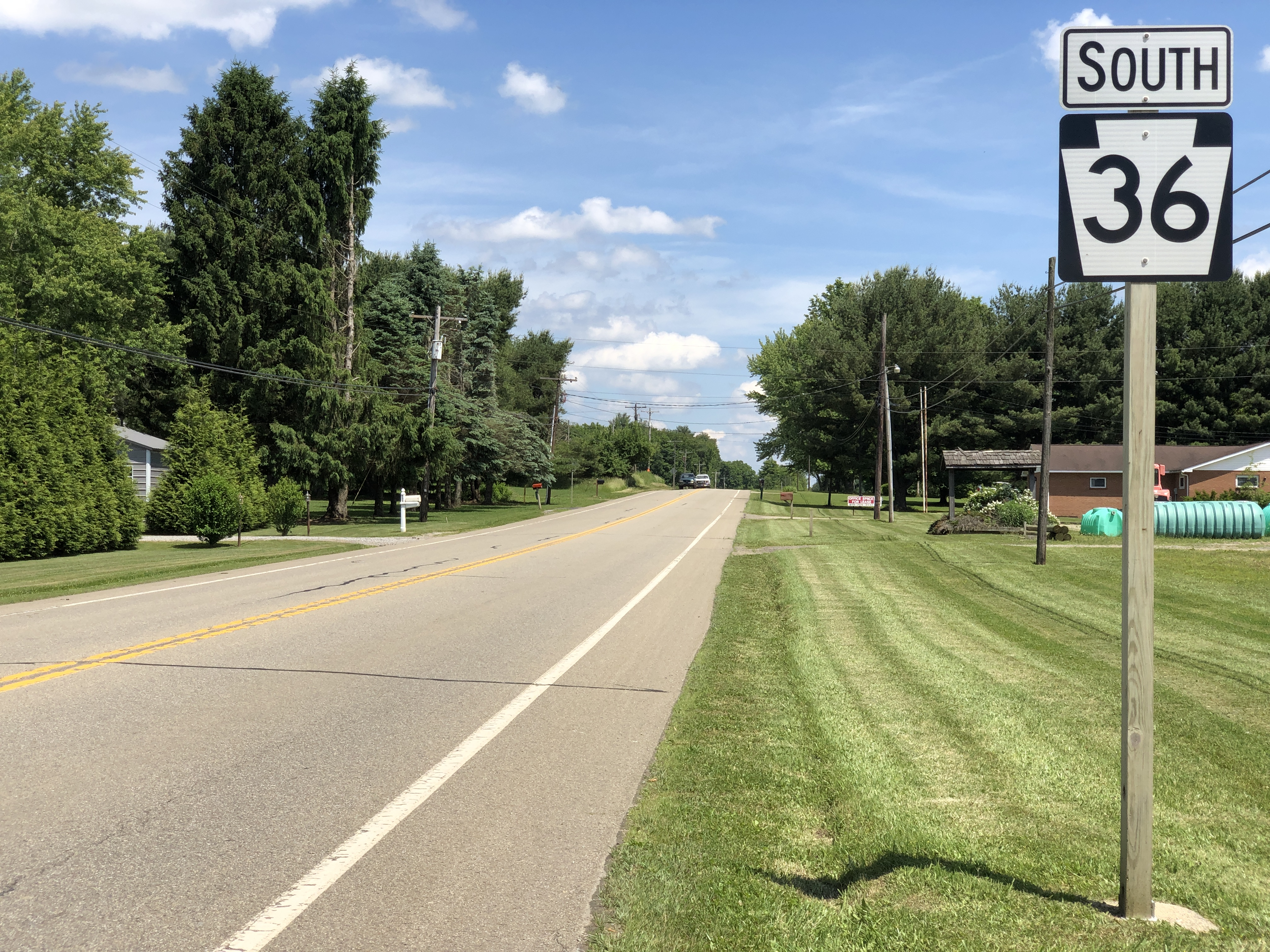
PA 36 southbound in Green Township

PA 36 enters Clarion County running westward. In the town of Leeper, the route intersects PA 66. Past Leeper, the highway runs northwest, intersecting PA 208, and exiting the county. In Forest County, PA 36 has a short overlap with U.S. Route 62, in the borough of Tionesta along the Allegheny River. In Venango County, PA 36 runs mostly northwest before reaching the northern terminus at PA 27/PA 227 in Pleasantville.

== History ==
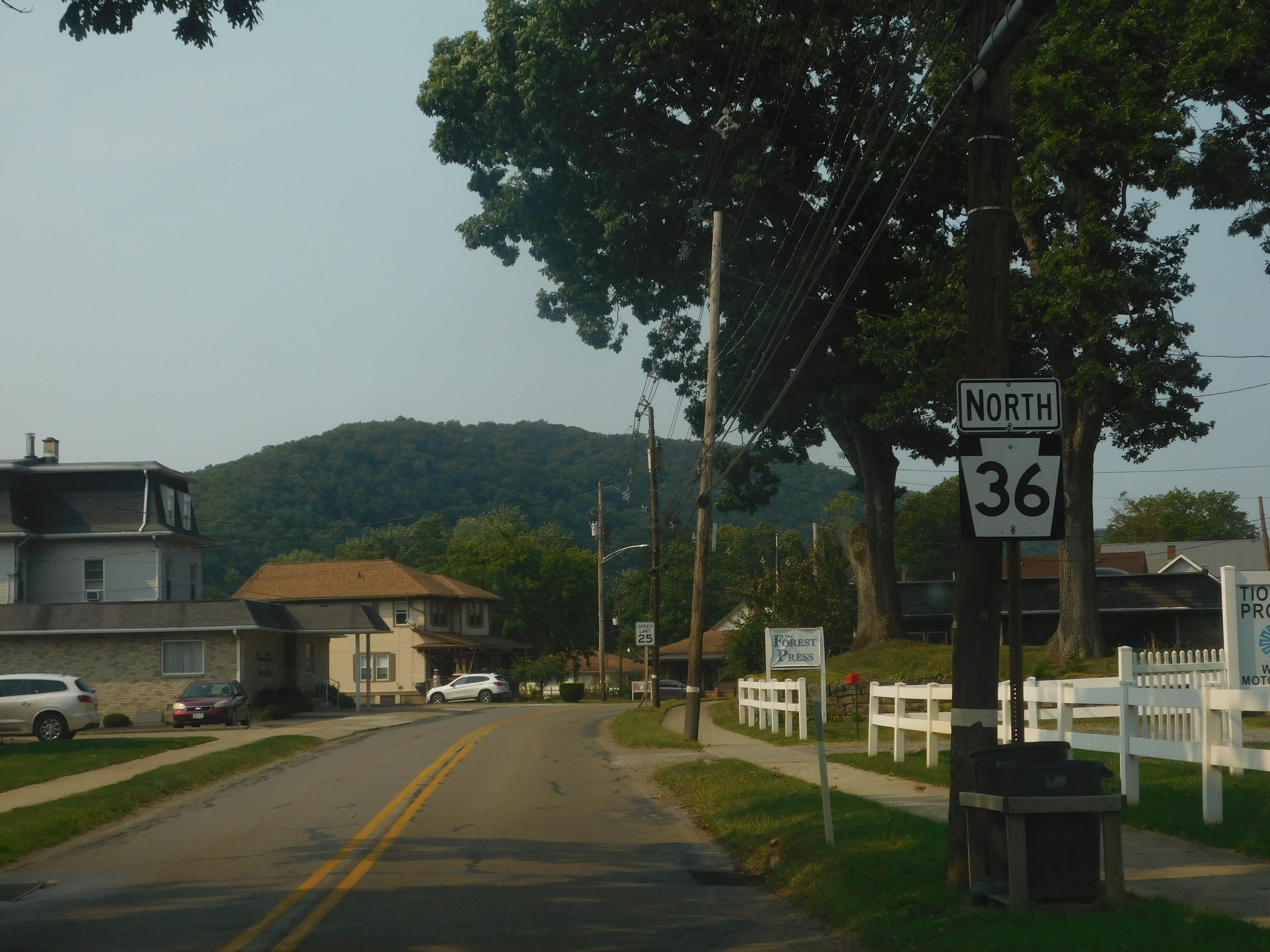
PA 36 in Tionesta

PA 36 was originally designated from Pleasant Valley Boulevard (U.S. Route 220) in Altoona to PA 66 in Clarion County. From the original northern terminus to Tionesta, the highway was signed as PA 66, and from Tionesta to the current terminus, it was signed as PA 227. From Roaring Spring to the current southern terminus, it was designated as PA 426.

By 1940, the northern terminus was moved to its current location. Also by this time, the southern terminus was extended south to U.S. Route 30 west of Everett along what is today Lower Snake Spring Road and Church View Road. By 1950, the current southernmost segment of PA 36 between PA 26 and Loysburg was redesignated as PA 868. On December 21, 1955, the route was designated as the "Col. Drake Highway" in honor of Edwin L. Drake, the first to drill for oil in the United States.

By 1980, the southern terminus was moved to its current location.

== Major intersections ==
County	Location	mi	km	Destinations	Notes
Bedford	Hopewell Township	0.00	0.00	PA 26 – Huntingdon, Everett	Southern terminus
Bedford	South Woodbury Township	3.79	6.10	PA 869 west (Brumbaugh Road) – New Enterprise	Eastern terminus of PA 869
Bedford	South Woodbury Township	5.01	8.06	PA 868 north (Potter Creek Road) – Bakers Summit	Southern terminus of PA 868
Bedford	Woodbury Township	8.34	13.42	PA 866 north (Curryville Road) – Martinsburg	Southern terminus of PA 866
Blair	Roaring Spring	15.63	25.15	PA 164 east (Main Street) – Martinsburg	South end of PA 164 concurrency
Blair	Roaring Spring	16.51	26.57	PA 867 south (Main Street) – Roaring Spring	Northern terminus of PA 867
Blair	Freedom Township	18.61	29.95	PA 164 west (Cedar Street) to I-99 / US 220 – Altoona, Duncansville, Portage	North end of PA 164 concurrency
Blair	Hollidaysburg	23.80	38.30	Loop Road	Interchange
Blair	Hollidaysburg	23.80	38.30	US 22 (Blair Street) – Ebensburg, Huntingdon	
Blair	Altoona	27.35	44.02	US 220 Bus. south (Plank Road)	South end of US BUS 220 concurrency
Blair	Altoona	27.65	44.50	US 220 Bus. north (Pleasant Valley Boulevard)	North end of US BUS 220 concurrency
Blair	Altoona	29.05	46.75	PA 764 north (6th Avenue)	
Blair	Altoona			PA 764 south (7th Avenue)	
Cambria	Ashville	39.15	63.01	PA 53 north (Market Street) – Van Ormer	South end of PA 53 wrong-way concurrency
Cambria	Ashville	39.31	63.26	PA 53 south (Main Street)	North end of PA 53 wrong-way concurrency
Clearfield	Mahaffey	69.31	111.54	US 219 north (Mahaffey Grampian Highway) – DuBois	South end of US 219 wrong-way concurrency
Clearfield	Bell Township	71.56	115.16	US 219 south (Burnside McGee Highway) – Ebensburg	North end of US 219 wrong-way concurrency
Indiana	No major junctions				
Jefferson	Punxsutawney	84.00	135.18	US 119 north (Hampton Avenue) – Reynoldsville, DuBois	South end of US 119 wrong-way concurrency
Jefferson	Punxsutawney	84.30	135.67	US 119 south (Gilpin Street) – Indiana	North end of US 119 wrong-way concurrency
Jefferson	Punxsutawney	85.36	137.37	PA 436 south (Lincoln Avenue) – Indiana	Northern terminus of PA 436
Jefferson	Young Township	87.45	140.74	PA 536 west – Frostburg, Ringgold	Eastern terminus of PA 536
Jefferson	Brookville	103.75	166.97	US 322 east / PA 28 north (Main Street)	South end of US 322/PA 28 wrong-way concurrency
Jefferson	Brookville	104.53	168.22	US 322 west (28th Division Highway) / PA 28 south (Main Street) – Clarion, New Bethlehem PA 28 Truck begins	North end of US 322/PA 28 wrong-way concurrency; south end of PA 28 Truck concurrency
Jefferson	Brookville	105.03	169.03	I-80 / PA 28 Truck north – Clarion, DuBois	Exit 78 (I-80); north end of PA 28 Truck concurrency
Jefferson	Eldred Township	112.48	181.02	PA 949 (Clear Creek Road) – Corsica, Ridgway	
Jefferson	Barnett Township	115.72	186.23	PA 899 north – Clarington, Marienville	Southern terminus of PA 899
Clarion	Farmington Township	127.37	204.98	PA 66 – Clarion, Marienville	
Clarion	Washington Township	131.74	212.01	PA 208 west – Fryburg	Eastern terminus of PA 208
Forest	Tionesta	141.24	227.30	US 62 north (Elm Street) – Warren	South end of US 62 wrong-way concurrency
Forest	Tionesta	141.60	227.88	US 62 south – Oil City, Franklin	North end of US 62 wrong-way concurrency
Venango	Pleasantville	151.12	243.20	PA 27 / PA 227 (West State Street/North Main Street)	Northern terminus
1.000 mi = 1.609 km; 1.000 km = 0.621 mi: Concurrency terminus
