= Barnett Township, Pennsylvania =

Barnett Township is the name of some places in the U.S. state of Pennsylvania:

- Barnett Township, Forest County, Pennsylvania
- Barnett Township, Jefferson County, Pennsylvania
