= Jenks Township, Forest County, Pennsylvania =

Township in Pennsylvania, United States

Coordinates: 41°28′00″N 79°02′59″W

Jenks Township, Pennsylvania
- Township
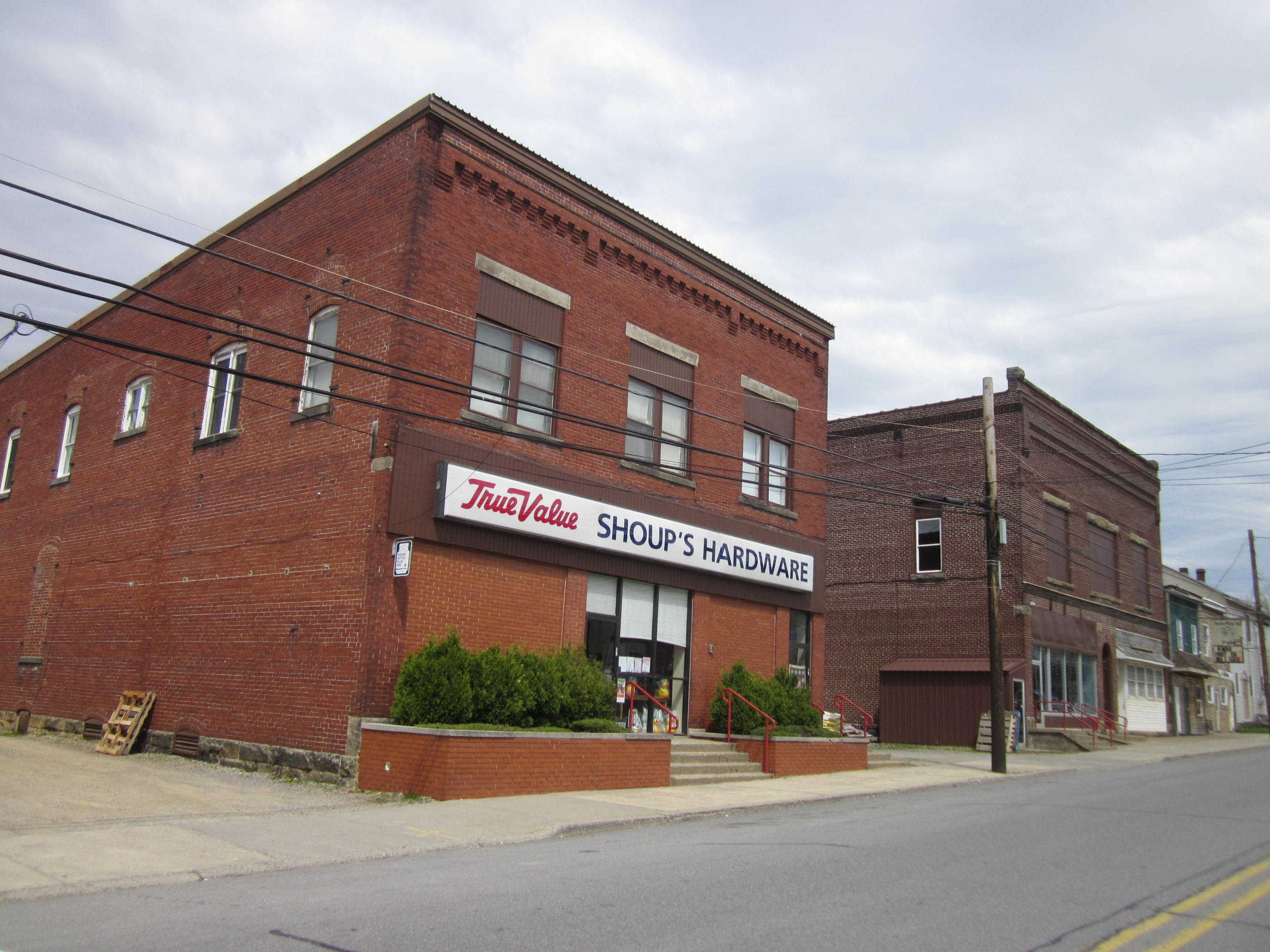
- Merienville is the primary settlement in the township.

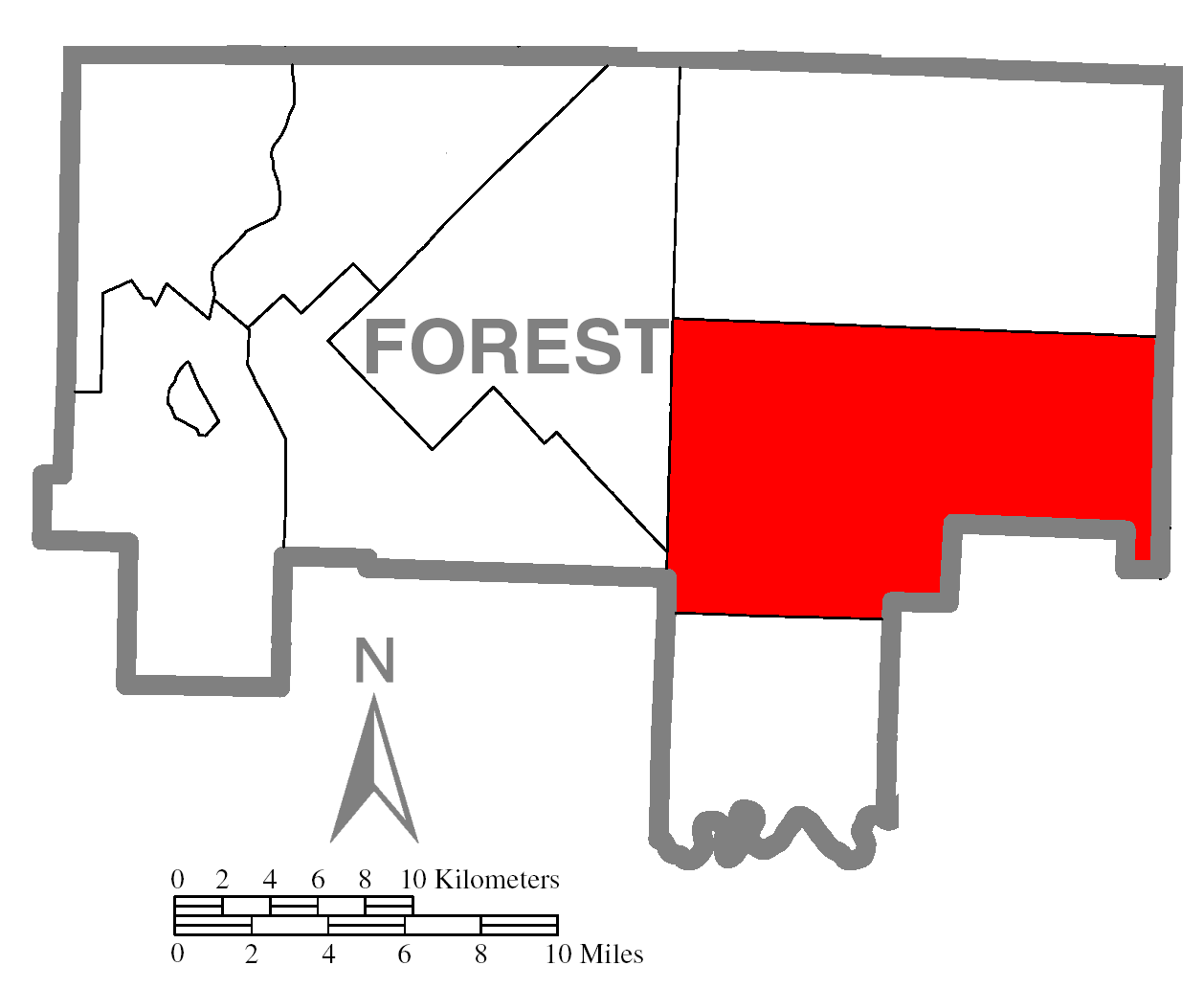
- Map of Forest County, Pennsylvania highlighting Jenks Township

- Map of Forest County, Pennsylvania
- Country: United States
- State: Pennsylvania
- County: Forest
- Settled: 1833

Government
  - Type: Board of Supervisors

Area
  - Total: 84.61 sq mi (219.15 km^{2})
  - Land: 84.44 sq mi (218.71 km^{2})
  - Water: 0.17 sq mi (0.44 km^{2})

Population (2020)
  - Total: 3,849
  - Estimate (2023): 3,443
  - Density: 45.58/sq mi (17.60/km^{2})
- Time zone: UTC-5 (Eastern (EST))
  - Summer (DST): UTC-4 (EDT)
- Area code: 814
- FIPS code: 42-053-38016
- Website: jenkstownship.org

Jenks Township is a township that is located in Forest County, Pennsylvania, United States. The population was 3,849 at the time of the 2020 census, an increase from 3,629 in 2010, a figure that was, in turn, an increase from 1,261 in 2000 with the opening of the SCI Forest penitentiary.

The township is the most populous municipality in all of Forest County. It was named for John W. Jenks, a county judge.

== Geography ==
Jenks Township is located in southeastern Forest County, and is bordered to the east and partially to the south by Elk County and partially to the southwest by Clarion County. Marienville is located near the center of the township.

Pennsylvania Route 66 crosses the township from southwest to northeast, passing through Marienville. Pennsylvania Route 899 leads south from Marienville to Clarington in Barnett Township.

According to the United States Census Bureau, Jenks Township has a total area of 84.6 square miles (219.2 km^{2}), of which 84.4 square miles (218.7 km^{2}) is land and 0.2 square miles (0.4 km^{2}), or 0.20%, is water.

== Demographics ==
Historical population
| Census | Pop. | Note | %± |
|---|---|---|---|
| 2000 | 1,261 | | — |
| 2010 | 3,629 | | 187.8% |
| 2020 | 3,849 | | 6.1% |
| 2023 (est.) | 3,443 | | −10.5% |

As of the census of 2000, there were 1,261 people, 510 households, and 336 families residing in the township.

The population density was 14.9 people per square mile (5.8/km^{2}). There were 1,623 housing units at an average density of 19.2/sq mi (7.4/km^{2}).

The racial makeup of the township was 98.41% White, 0.40% African American, 0.32% Native American, 0.08% Asian, and 0.79% from two or more races. Hispanic or Latino of any race were 0.56% of the population.

There were 510 households, out of which 23.1% had children under the age of eighteen living with them; 55.3% were married couples living together, 8.0% had a female householder with no husband present, and 34.1% were non-families. 30.8% of all households were made up of individuals, and 14.3% had someone living alone who was sixty-five years of age or older.

The average household size was 2.28 and the average family size was 2.84.

Within the township, the population was spread out, with 19.2% of those living there under the age of eighteen, 4.4% who were aged eighteen to twenty-four, 24.1% between ages twenty-five and forty-four, 29.0% who were aged forty-five to sixty-four, and 23.2% who were sixty-five years of age or older. The median age was forty-six years.

For every one hundred females there were 87.6 males. For every one hundred females who were aged eighteen or older, there were 87.7 males.

The median income for a household in the township was $27,067, and the median income for a family was $32,273. Males had a median income of $26,683 compared with that of $24,063 for females.

The per capita income for the township was $15,131.

Approximately 9.2% of families and 12.3% of the population were living below the poverty line, including 15.6% of those who were under the age of eighteen and 9.3% of those who were aged sixty-five or older.

== Gallery ==
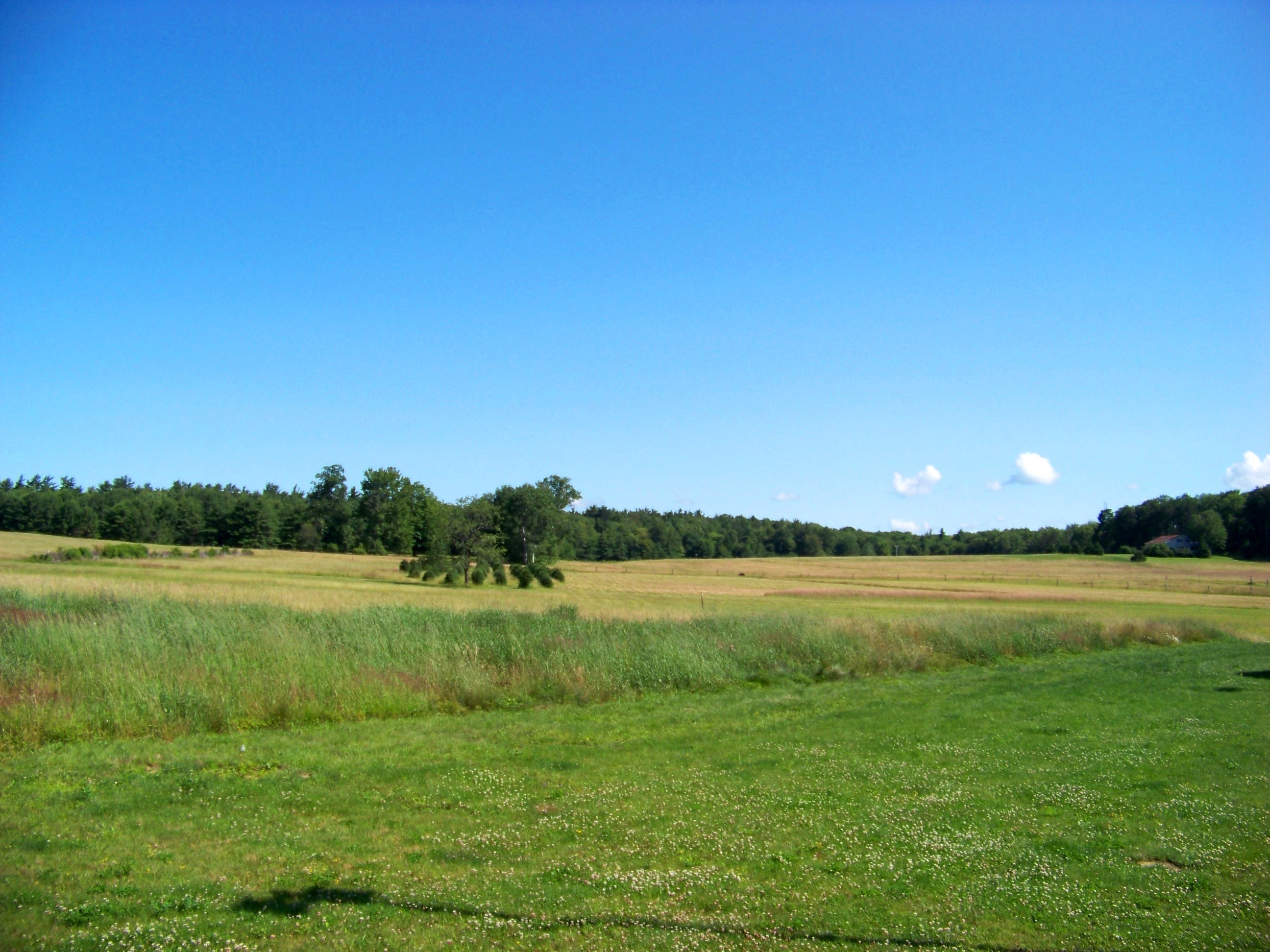
Farmland
