= Clarington (disambiguation) =

Clarington is a city in Ontario, Canada.

Clarington may also refer to:

- Clarington, Ohio, United States
- Clarington, Pennsylvania, United States
