= List of Pennsylvania state historical markers in Forest County =

Location of Forest County in Pennsylvania

This is a list of the Pennsylvania state historical markers in Forest County.

This is intended to be a complete list of the official state historical markers placed in Forest County, Pennsylvania by the Pennsylvania Historical and Museum Commission (PHMC). The locations of the historical markers, as well as the latitude and longitude coordinates as provided by the PHMC's database, are included below when available. There are 11 historical markers located in Forest County.

== Historical markers ==
Marker title	Image	Date dedicated	Location	Marker type	Topics
Damascus		July 29, 1947	US 62 at Tionesta; 41.507679°N 79.451993°W	Roadside	Cities & Towns
Forest County		August 21, 1982	County Courthouse, Elm Street (US 62), Tionesta; 41.49665°N 79.45623°W	City	Environment, Government & Politics, Government & Politics 19th Century
Goschgoschink		July 29, 1947	US 62, south of PA 127, East Hickory; 41.56805°N 79.40352°W	Roadside	Cities & Towns, Early Settlement, Native American (Lenape)
Hickory Town		July 29, 1947	US 62 & Little Hickory Road, East Hickory; 41.55905°N 79.41885°W	Roadside	Cities & Towns, Early Settlement, Native American, Paths & Trails
Holeman Ferry		August 5, 1954	US 62, 3 miles southwest of Tionesta (MISSING)	Roadside	Business & Industry, Transportation
Howard Zahniser		August 13, 2001	US 62 just north of Tionesta; 41.51855°N 79.44265°W	Roadside	Environment, Government & Politics (20th century)
Indian Paths		July 29, 1947	US 62, 2.3 miles south of East Hickory; 41.54583°N 79.43158°W	Roadside	Native American
Lawunakhannek		July 29, 1947	US 62, .2 mile north of East Hickory; 41.58643°N 79.40387°W	Roadside	Early Settlement, Native American (Lenape), Religion (Moravian mission)
Pigeon		June 3, 1948	PA 66 & Pigeon Lane, 6 miles northeast of Marienville; 41.52535°N 79.05625°W	Roadside	Cities & Towns, Environment, Native American
Refugee Towns		July 29, 1947	US 62, 1.5 miles south of Tionesta; 41.476784°N 79.47156°W	Roadside	Early Settlement, Native American
Refugee Towns		July 29, 1947	US 62, .5 mile north of East Hickory; 41.58652°N 79.403847°W	Roadside	Early Settlement, Native American

== See also ==
- List of Pennsylvania state historical markers
- National Register of Historic Places listings in Forest County, Pennsylvania
