= Barnett Township, Forest County, Pennsylvania =

Township in Pennsylvania, United States

Coordinates: 41°22′00″N 79°06′59″W

- Township
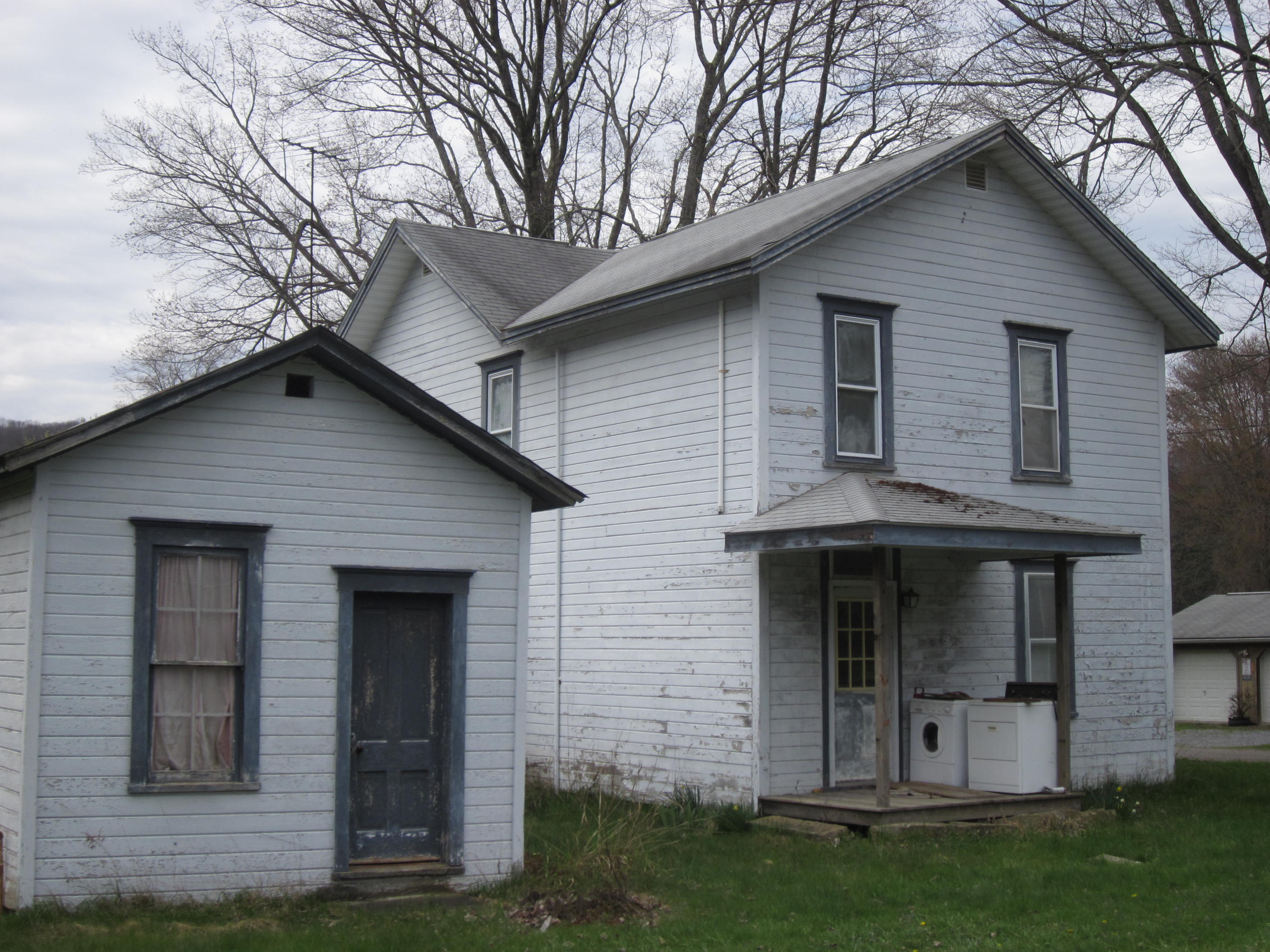
- Clarington is a small village between Cook Forest State Park and Allegheny National Forest in the township.

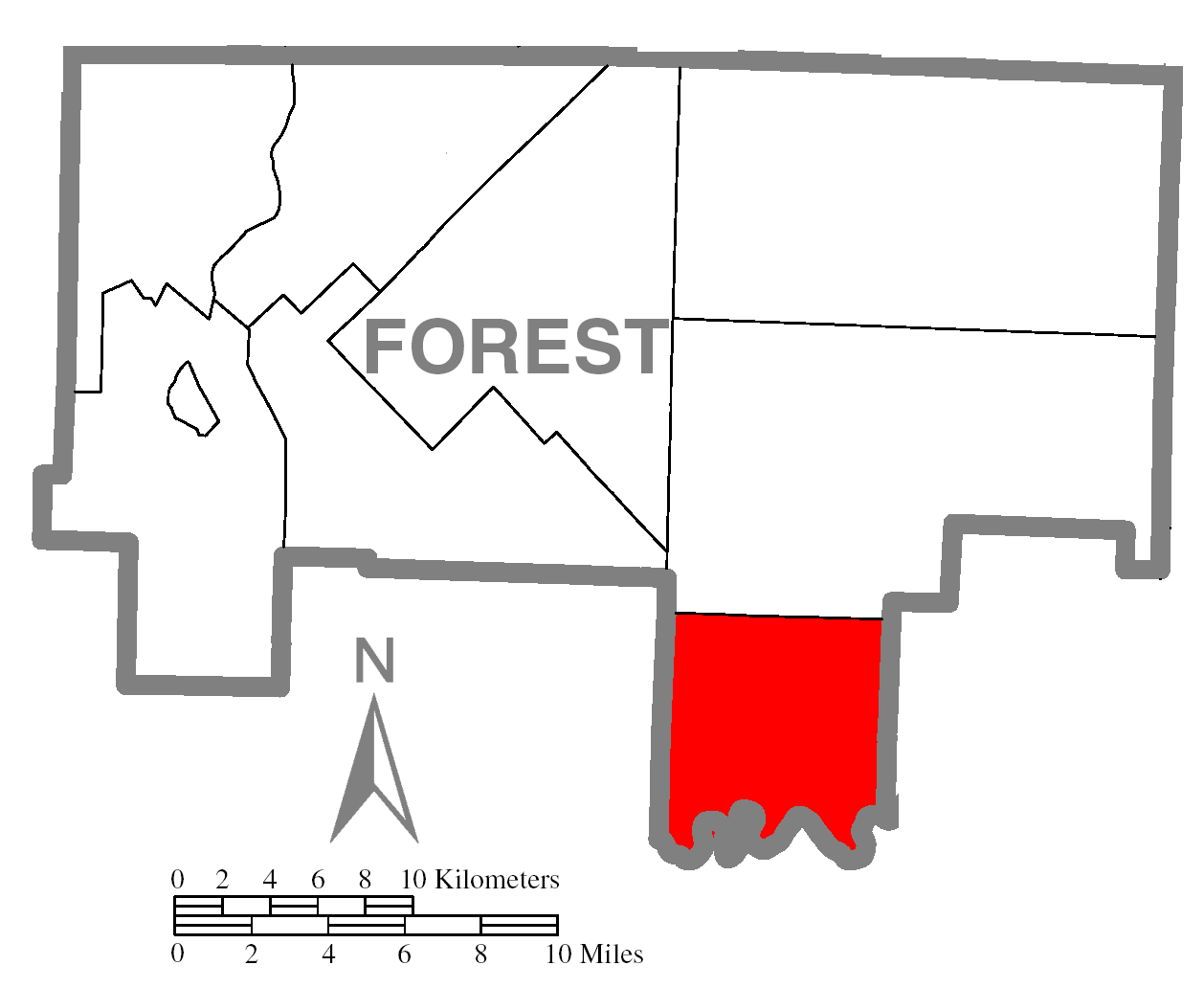
- Map of Forest County, Pennsylvania highlighting Barnett Township

- Map of Forest County, Pennsylvania
- Country: United States
- State: Pennsylvania
- County: Forest
- Settled: 1854
- Incorporated: 1854

Government
  - Type: Board of Supervisors
  - Supervisor: Joe Calla
  - Supervisor: David Wilson
  - Supervisor: Kurt Traugott

Area
  - Total: 34.35 sq mi (88.97 km^{2})
  - Land: 34.34 sq mi (88.94 km^{2})
  - Water: 0.0077 sq mi (0.02 km^{2})

Population (2020)
  - Total: 309
  - Estimate (2023): 298
  - Density: 9.00/sq mi (3.47/km^{2})
- Time zone: UTC-5 (Eastern (EST))
  - Summer (DST): UTC-4 (EDT)
- Area code: 814
- FIPS code: 42-053-04224
- Website: www.barnetttwp.com

Barnett Township is a township in Forest County, Pennsylvania, United States. The population was 309 at the 2020 census, down from 361 in 2010.

== History ==
The Cook Forest State Park Indian Cabin District, Cook Forest State Park River Cabin District, and Anthony Wayne Cook Mansion are listed on the National Register of Historic Places.

== Geography ==
Barnett Township is in southeastern Forest County, bordered to the east by Elk County, to the west by Clarion County, and to the south, across the Clarion River, by Barnett Township, Jefferson County. The township includes the unincorporated communities of Redclyffe, Hottelville, Clarington, and Cooksburg.

Pennsylvania Route 899 crosses the township, leading north to Marienville and south (via PA 36) to Brookville.

According to the United States Census Bureau, the township has a total area of 34.4 square miles (89.0 km^{2}), of which 0.01 square miles (0.02 km^{2}), or 0.03%, is water.

== Demographics ==
Historical population
Census	Pop.	Note	%±
2000	349		—
2010	361		3.4%
2020	309		−14.4%
2023 (est.)	298		−3.6%
U.S. Decennial Census

As of the census of 2000, there were 349 people, 156 households, and 105 families residing in the township. The population density was 10.2 people per square mile (3.9/km^{2}). There were 780 housing units at an average density of 22.7/sq mi (8.8/km^{2}). The racial makeup of the township was 99.43% White and 0.57% Native American.

There were 156 households, out of which 22.4% had children under the age of 18 living with them, 60.3% were married couples living together, 4.5% had a female householder with no husband present, and 32.1% were non-families. 29.5% of all households were made up of individuals, and 16.0% had someone living alone who was 65 years of age or older. The average household size was 2.24 and the average family size was 2.75.

In the township the population was spread out, with 17.2% under the age of 18, 3.4% from 18 to 24, 21.8% from 25 to 44, 33.5% from 45 to 64, and 24.1% who were 65 years of age or older. The median age was 49 years. For every 100 females, there were 115.4 males. For every 100 females age 18 and over, there were 112.5 males.

The median income for a household in the township was $31,250, and the median income for a family was $40,000. Males had a median income of $32,404 versus $16,591 for females. The per capita income for the township was $13,995. About 13.6% of families and 21.9% of the population were below the poverty line, including 28.2% of those under age 18 and 5.0% of those age 65 or over.
