= Pennsylvania Route 899 =

State highway in Pennsylvania, US

Pennsylvania Route 899

Route information
- Maintained by PennDOT
- Length: 10.794 mi (17.371 km)
- Existed: 1928–present

Major junctions
- South end: PA 36 in Barnett Township
- North end: PA 66 in Jenks Township

Location
- Country: United States
- State: Pennsylvania
- Counties: Jefferson, Forest

Highway system
- Pennsylvania State Route System; Interstate; US; State; Scenic; Legislative
← PA 898	→ PA 900

Pennsylvania Route 899 (PA 899) is a 10.8-mile-long (17.4 km) state highway located in Jefferson and Forest counties in Pennsylvania. The southern terminus is at PA 36 in Barnett Township. The northern terminus is at PA 66 in Jenks Township.

== Route description ==
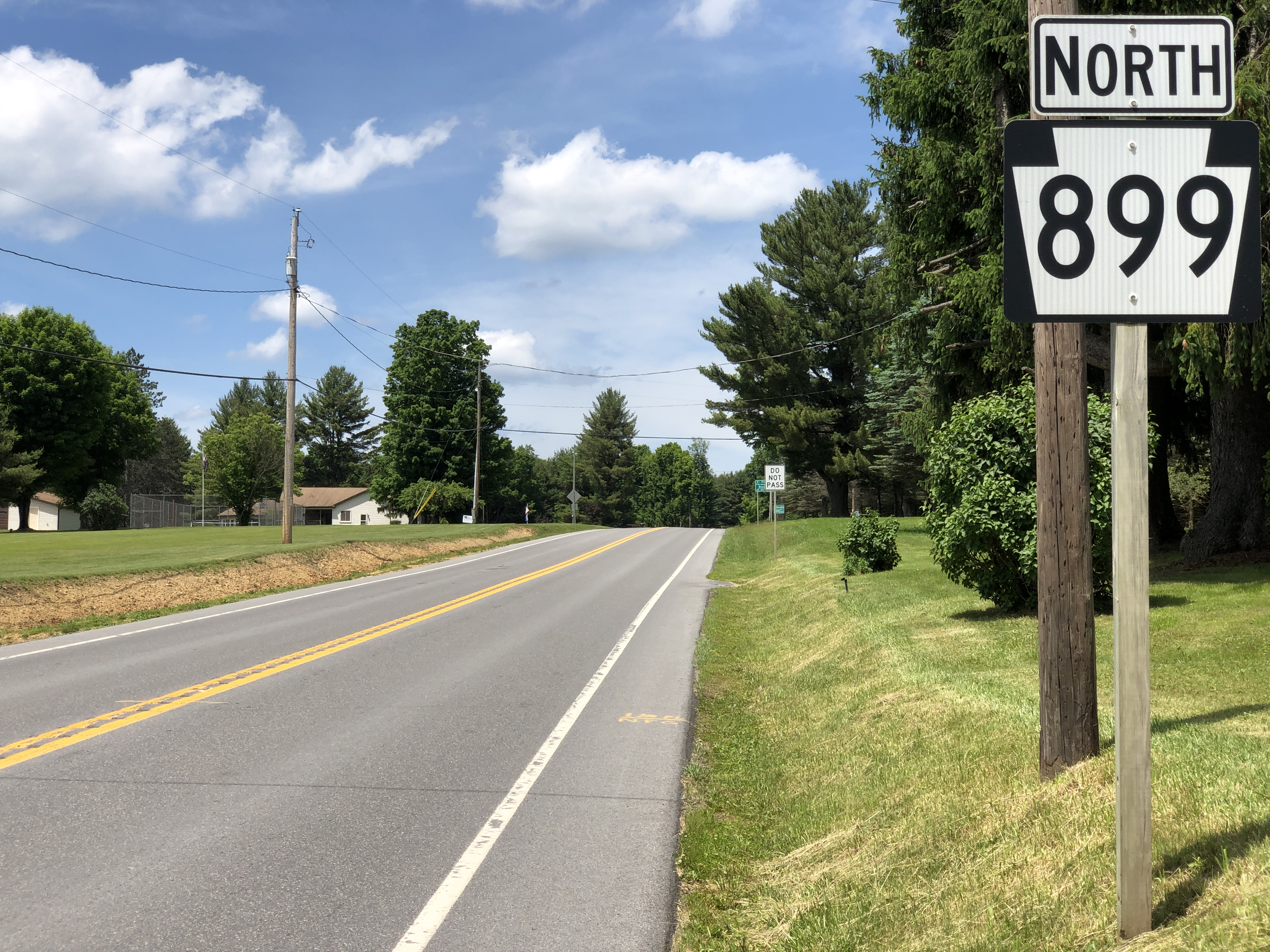
PA 899 northbound in Barnett Township

PA 899 begins at an intersection with PA 36 in Barnett Township, Jefferson County, heading north on a two-lane undivided road. The route passes between woods to the west and fields to the east before heading through forested areas, turning to the northeast. The road crosses the Clarion River into Barnett Township in Forest County and turns northwest at Clarington, running along the northeast bank of the river. PA 899 turns north away from the river and continues through more forests. The road winds northwest through more wooded areas with occasional fields, passing through Redclyffe. The route crosses into Jenks Township and continues north through more forests with some fields and homes. PA 899 turns northeast and crosses an abandoned railroad line, passing through Roses before turning north and ending at PA 66.

== Major intersections ==
County	Location	mi	km	Destinations	Notes
Jefferson	Barnett Township	0.000	0.000	PA 36	Southern terminus
Forest	Jenks Township	10.794	17.371	PA 66 – Marienville, Leeper	Northern terminus
1.000 mi = 1.609 km; 1.000 km = 0.621 mi
