= Pennsylvania school shooting =

Pennsylvania school shooting may refer to:

- Enoch Brown school massacre, Greencastle, Pennsylvania, July 26, 1764
- 1998 Parker Middle School dance shooting, Edinboro, Pennsylvania, April 24, 1998
- West Nickel Mines School shooting, Bart Township, Lancaster County, Pennsylvania, October 2, 2006

== See also ==
- Franklin Regional High School stabbing, a school stabbing in Murrysville, Pennsylvania, April 9, 2014
