= Anthony Wayne Cook Mansion =

Historic house in Pennsylvania, United States

- U.S. National Register of Historic Places
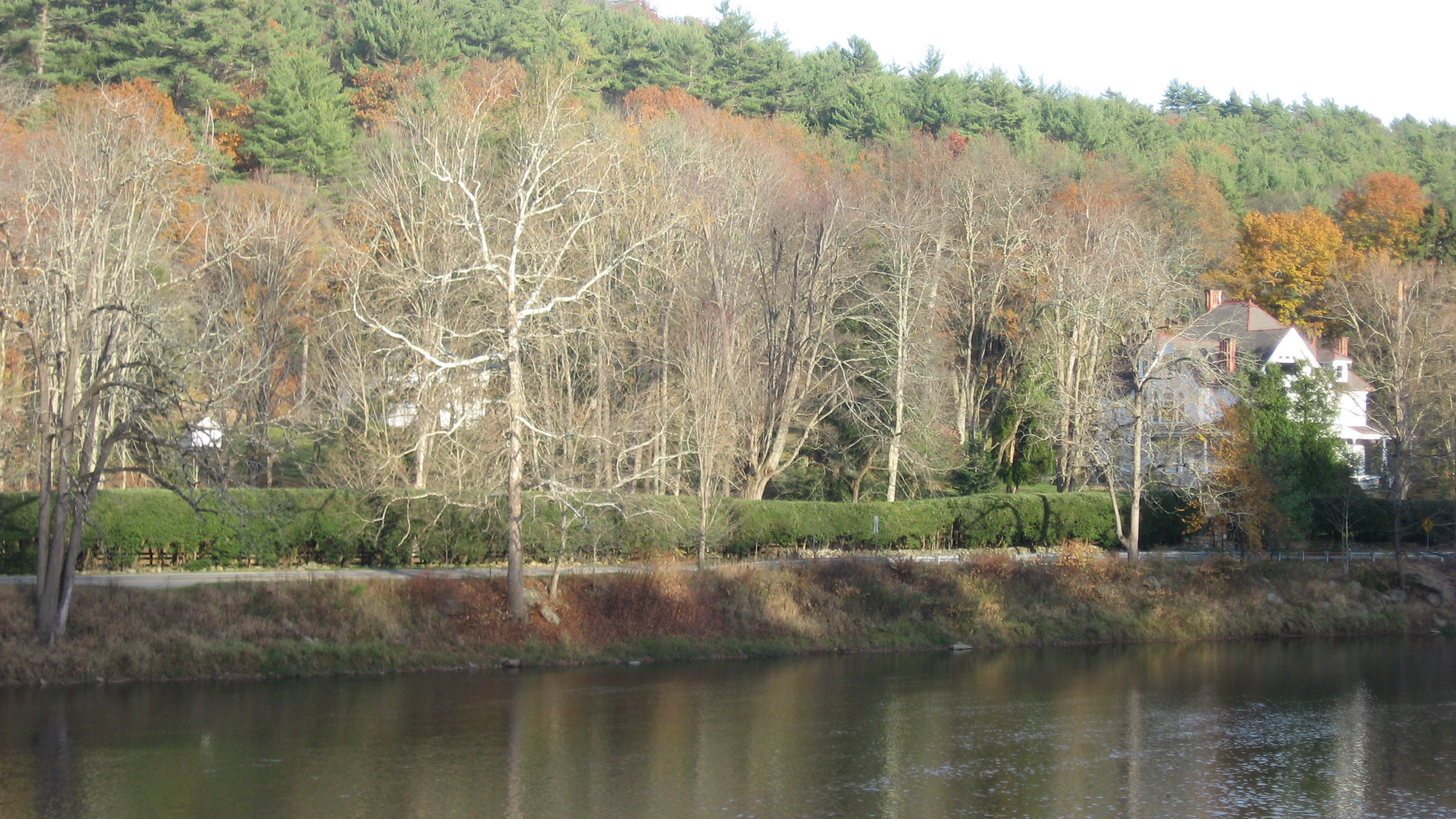
- Overview of the estate

- Location within Pennsylvania Location within the United States
- Location: River Dr., Cooksburg, Barnett Township, Pennsylvania
- Coordinates: 41°19′52″N 79°12′20″W
- Area: 5 acres (2.0 ha)
- Built: 1880
- Architectural style: Queen Anne
- NRHP reference No.: 79002226
- Added to NRHP: June 19, 1979

Anthony Wayne Cook Mansion is a historic home located at Cooksburg in Barnett Township, Forest County, Pennsylvania, United States. It was built in 1880, and is a three-story, irregularly shaped Queen Anne style dwelling. It features a two-story tower, multiple dormers, a front gable, and one-story porch. Also on the property is a contributing carriage house, ice house, and chicken coops.

It was added to the National Register of Historic Places in 1979.
