= State Correctional Institution – Forest =

Prison in Pennsylvania, United States

Coordinates: 41°28′51″N 79°05′51″W

State Correctional Institution - Forest
- Interactive map of State Correctional Institution - Forest
- Location: Marienville, Jenks Township, Forest County, Pennsylvania
- Security class: Maximum-Security
- Capacity: 2,309
- Population: 2,389
- Opened: October, 2004
- Managed by: Pennsylvania Department of Corrections

The State Correctional Institution – Forest is one of two identical correctional facilities in Pennsylvania that were constructed in the beginning of the twenty-first century to hold maximum-security male inmates. SCI Forest is located in the community of Marienville, in remote Forest County.

In December of 2025, Forest held 2,246 inmates against a public capacity of 2,582 individuals, or 87.0%.

== Creation of SCI-Forest ==
SCI – Forest and SCI-Fayette, which are identical in size and design, were constructed to accommodate overcrowding at SCI-Pittsburgh and SCI-Waynesburg, which were "mothballed" after the opening of SCI Forest. Construction of the correctional facility cost $126 million.

== Notable Inmates ==
| Inmate Name | Register Number | Status | Details |
|---|---|---|---|
| Andrew Jerome Wurst | EA5775 | Serving a 30-60 year sentence with possibility of parole in 2028. | Perpetrator of the 1998 Parker Middle School dance shooting in which he murdered teacher John Gillette. |

== See also ==
- List of Pennsylvania state prisons
