= East Hickory, Pennsylvania =

Unincorporated community in Pennsylvania, US

- Unincorporated community
- Location within Pennsylvania
- Coordinates: 41°35′02″N 79°24′06″W
- Country: United States
- State: Pennsylvania
- County: Forest
- Elevation: 1,079 ft (329 m)
- Time zone: UTC-5 (Eastern (EST))
  - Summer (DST): UTC-4 (EDT)
- ZIP code: 16321
- Area code: 814
- GNIS feature ID: 1209586

East Hickory is an unincorporated community in Forest County, Pennsylvania, United States.

== Location ==
The community is located along the Allegheny River at the intersection of U.S. Route 62 and Pennsylvania Route 666, 6.7 miles (10.8 km) north-northeast of Tionesta. East Hickory has a post office with ZIP code 16321.
