= Barnett Township, Jefferson County, Pennsylvania =

Township in Pennsylvania, US

Coordinates: 41°18′00″N 79°06′59″W

- Township
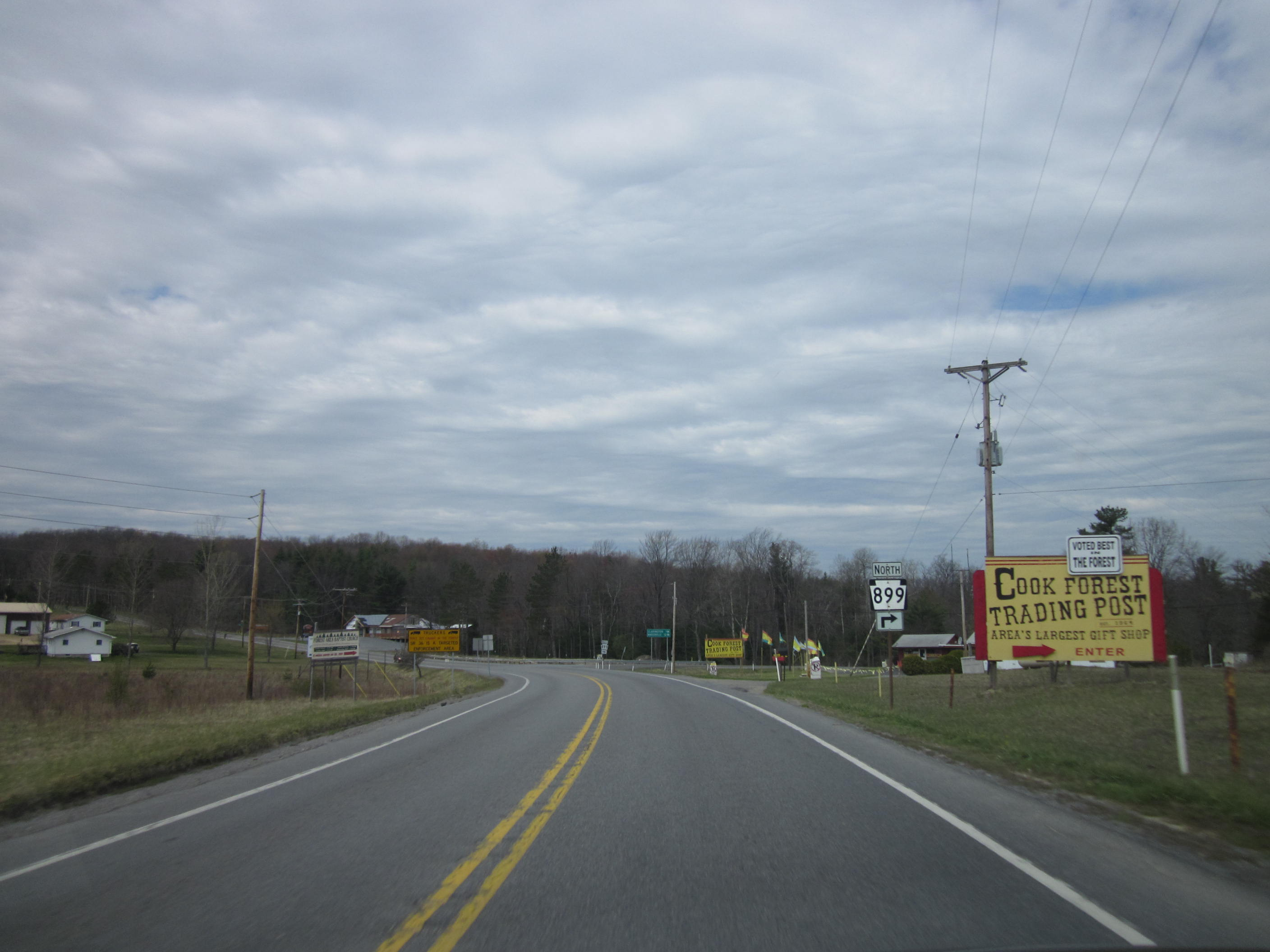
- Intersection of PA 36 and PA 899 in Barnett Township

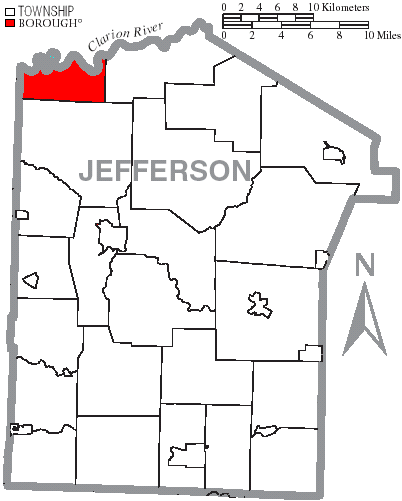
- Map of Jefferson County, Pennsylvania Highlighting Barnett Township

- Map of Jefferson County, Pennsylvania
- Country: United States
- State: Pennsylvania
- County: Jefferson
- Settled: 1827
- Incorporated: 1833

Area
  - Total: 15.14 sq mi (39.21 km^{2})
  - Land: 14.58 sq mi (37.77 km^{2})
  - Water: 0.56 sq mi (1.45 km^{2})

Population (2020)
  - Total: 231
  - Estimate (2023): 227
  - Density: 15.8/sq mi (6.12/km^{2})
- Time zone: UTC-5 (Eastern (EST))
  - Summer (DST): UTC-4 (EDT)
- FIPS code: 42-065-04240

Barnett Township is a township in Jefferson County, Pennsylvania, United States. The population was 231 at the 2020 census down from 254 at the 2010 census. It was named for Jefferson County pioneer Joseph Barnett.

== Geography ==
Barnett Township occupies the northwestern corner of Jefferson County and is bordered to the north by Forest County and to the west by Clarion County. The Clarion River, a westward-flowing tributary of the Allegheny River, forms the northern border of the township and the Forest County line.

Pennsylvania Route 36 crosses the township, leading northwest to Leeper and south to Brookville, the Jefferson county seat. Pennsylvania Route 899 leads north from PA 36 towards Marienville.

According to the United States Census Bureau, Barnett township has a total area of 15.1 square miles (39.2 km^{2}), of which 14.6 square miles (37.8 km^{2}) are land and 0.54 square miles (1.4 km^{2}), or 3.69%, are water.

== Demographics ==
Historical population
Census	Pop.	Note	%±
1850	579		—
1860	303		−47.7%
1870	223		−26.4%
1880	296		32.7%
1890	360		21.6%
1900	460		27.8%
1910	330		−28.3%
1920	177		−46.4%
1930	136		−23.2%
1940	179		31.6%
1950	206		15.1%
1960	175		−15.0%
1970	201		14.9%
1980	262		30.3%
1990	269		2.7%
2000	272		1.1%
2010	254		−6.6%
2020	231		−9.1%
2023 (est.)	227		−1.7%
U.S. Decennial Censuses

As of the census of 2000, there were 272 people, 124 households, and 79 families residing in the township. The population density was 18.7 people per square mile (7.2/km^{2}). There were 378 housing units at an average density of 26.0 per square mile (10.0/km^{2}). The racial makeup of the township was 99.63% White, and 0.37% from two or more races. Hispanic or Latino of any race were 0.37% of the population.

There were 124 households, out of which 25.8% had children under the age of 18 living with them, 55.6% were married couples living together, 4.8% had a female householder with no husband present, and 35.5% were non-families. 31.5% of all households were made up of individuals, and 12.1% had someone living alone who was 65 years of age or older. The average household size was 2.19 and the average family size was 2.75.

In the township the population was spread out, with 20.2% under the age of 18, 5.1% from 18 to 24, 26.1% from 25 to 44, 32.0% from 45 to 64, and 16.5% who were 65 years of age or older. The median age was 45 years. For every 100 females, there were 97.1 males. For every 100 females age 18 and over, there were 99.1 males.

The median income for a household in the township was $30,500, and the median income for a family was $34,375. Males had a median income of $27,083 versus $20,625 for females. The per capita income for the township was $15,840. About 17.1% of families and 17.6% of the population were below the poverty line, including 22.8% of those under the age of 18 and 6.5% of those 65 or over.
