= Cook Forest State Park =

State park in Pennsylvania, United States

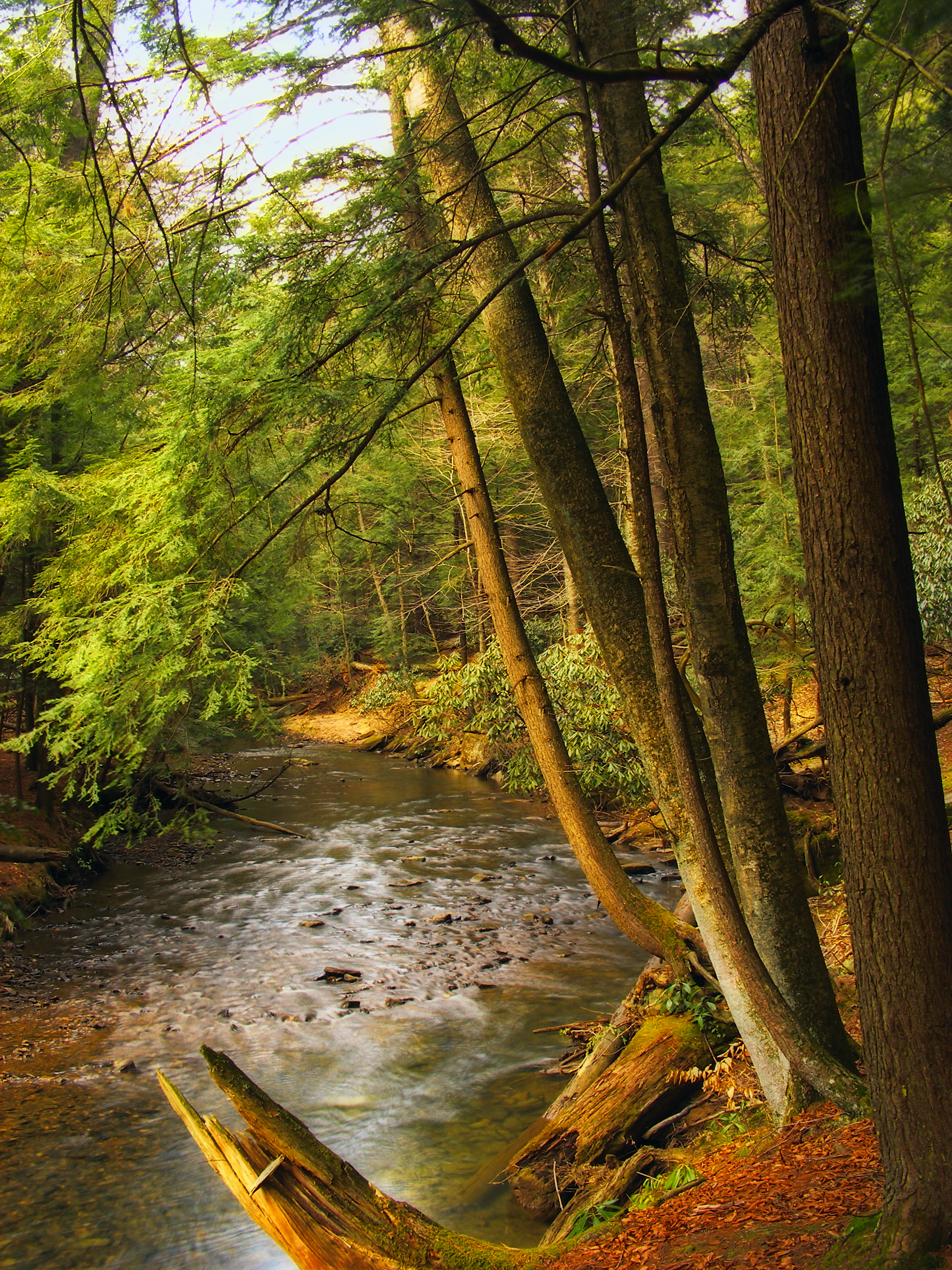
- Tom's Run
- Interactive map of Cook Forest State Park
- Location: Clarion, Forest and Jefferson counties, Pennsylvania, United States
- Coordinates: 41°19′59″N 79°12′33″W
- Area: 8,500 acres (3,400 ha)
- Elevation: 1,444 feet (440 m)
- Established: 1927
- Administrator: Pennsylvania Department of Conservation and Natural Resources
- Visitors: 507,260
- Named for: John Cook
- Website: Official website
- Cook Forest State Park Indian Cabin District
- U.S. National Register of Historic Places
- U.S. Historic district
- Pennsylvania state historical marker
- Location within Pennsylvania Location within the United States
- Location: Off PA 36 at Cooksburg, Cooksburg, Pennsylvania
- Area: 6.8 acres (2.8 ha)
- Built: 1933-1935
- Built by: Civilian Conservation Corps
- MPS: Emergency Conservation Work (ECW) Architecture in Pennsylvania State Parks: 1933-1942, TR
- NRHP reference No.: 87000019

Significant dates
- Added to NRHP: February 12, 1987
- Designated PHMC: September 17, 1954

U.S. National Natural Landmark
- Designated: November 1967

Cook Forest State Park is a 8,500-acre (3,440 ha) Pennsylvania state park in Farmington Township, Clarion County, Barnett Township, Forest County and Barnett Township, Jefferson County, Pennsylvania in the United States. Located just south of the Allegheny National Forest, the park is a heavily wooded area of rolling hills and mountains along the Clarion River in northwestern Pennsylvania. Cook Forest State Park is known for some of America's finest virgin white pine and hemlock timber stands and was once called the "Black Forest" due to the preponderance of evergreen tree coverage.

Cook Forest is now a National Natural Landmark and was rated one of America's top 50 state parks by National Geographic Traveler magazine. It was chosen by the Pennsylvania Department of Conservation and Natural Resources (DCNR) and its Bureau of Parks as one of "25 Must-See Pennsylvania State Parks".

== History ==
When European-Americans reached this part of Pennsylvania it was inhabited by the Seneca Nation of the Iroquois Confederacy. They used this area as a hunting grounds; the land of Cook Forest was then purchased by the English. Seneca Rock is still named after the first inhabitants, and the Paramount Pictures' film "Unconquered" was shot here in 1946 by Cecil B. DeMille and starring Gary Cooper and Paulette Goddard.

John Cook was the first permanent American settler. He arrived in 1826 to determine the feasibility of building an east-to-west canal along the Clarion River for the Commonwealth of Pennsylvania. John purchased 765 acres (310 ha) and settled here with his wife and 10 children in 1828.

At the mouth of Tom's Run, now adjacent to the park office, John built his one-story cabin and the first of many water-driven sawmills. He worked his mills, logged with oxen, rafted logs to Pittsburgh and also engaged in flatboat building through the years.

John's son Andrew bought 36 acres (15 ha) from his father, then gained the rest of his land when his father died in 1858. Andrew's industry expanded, and he built the original Cook Forest Inn for his woodsmen's living quarters. Andrew erected three sawmills, one flouring mill, one planing mill, a boat scaffold, several dwellings and a store. Andrew also served as a judge and local bank president. About 1870, he built the Cook Homestead (now a bed and breakfast) at the intersection of Route 36 and River Road. Cook family descendants still inhabit many of the homes along River Road. After Andrew's death, the business was managed under A. Cook Sons Company.

== The Forest Cathedral of Cook Forest ==
Major Israel McCreight of Du Bois, Pennsylvania, was author and steward of Cook Forest State Park, the first Pennsylvania State Park acquired to preserve a natural landmark, and a founder of the Pennsylvania Conservation Association. Cook Forest is the most important tract of virgin timberland to be found in Pennsylvania, and is without rival for size East of the Rockies. Once called the "Black Forest", the area is famous for its towering white pines and hemlocks. The idea to make Cook Forest a public park originated on McCreight's first visit to the "Forest Cathedral" near the Clarion River in northwest central Pennsylvania. "It was a beautiful day, August 21, 1910, that the writer with a few others were invited to a weekend house party at the A.W. Cook home. Cook would comment, as he led the way into the silent ‘temple of the gods’, and then listen to the exclamations of astonishment that were sure to come from those who followed along the fern-bound path in this fairyland. Often there was heard no comment, for in this silent cathedral of the Almighty, it was unuttered. Frequently it was observed that sturdy men could not restrain their tears, at the solemnity of their environment. It was during this walk that A.W. Cook and the writer sat down on a log to talk about the future fate of the magnificent panorama they saw and felt all about them, The writer said to him: ‘Cook, no greater crime could be committed than to destroy this; it shall not be destroyed; it must be saved for humanity’s sake." McCreight was determined to save the forest and began a campaign to conserve the natural landmark. In 1910, McCreight and others formed the Pennsylvania Conservation Association and successfully lobbied the legislature to consider Cook Forest for state park purposes. For sixteen years a series of unsuccessful legislative bills were introduced for the state to acquire Cook Forest. In 1923, the Cook Forest Association was formed for the purpose of acquiring the Cook Forest tract of virgin white pine and hemlock. Early pioneers with the Cook Forest Association were Major Israel McCreight, Theo Wilson and John Nicholson. The Association, endorsed by national natural resource groups and Governor Gifford Pinchot, raised $200,000.

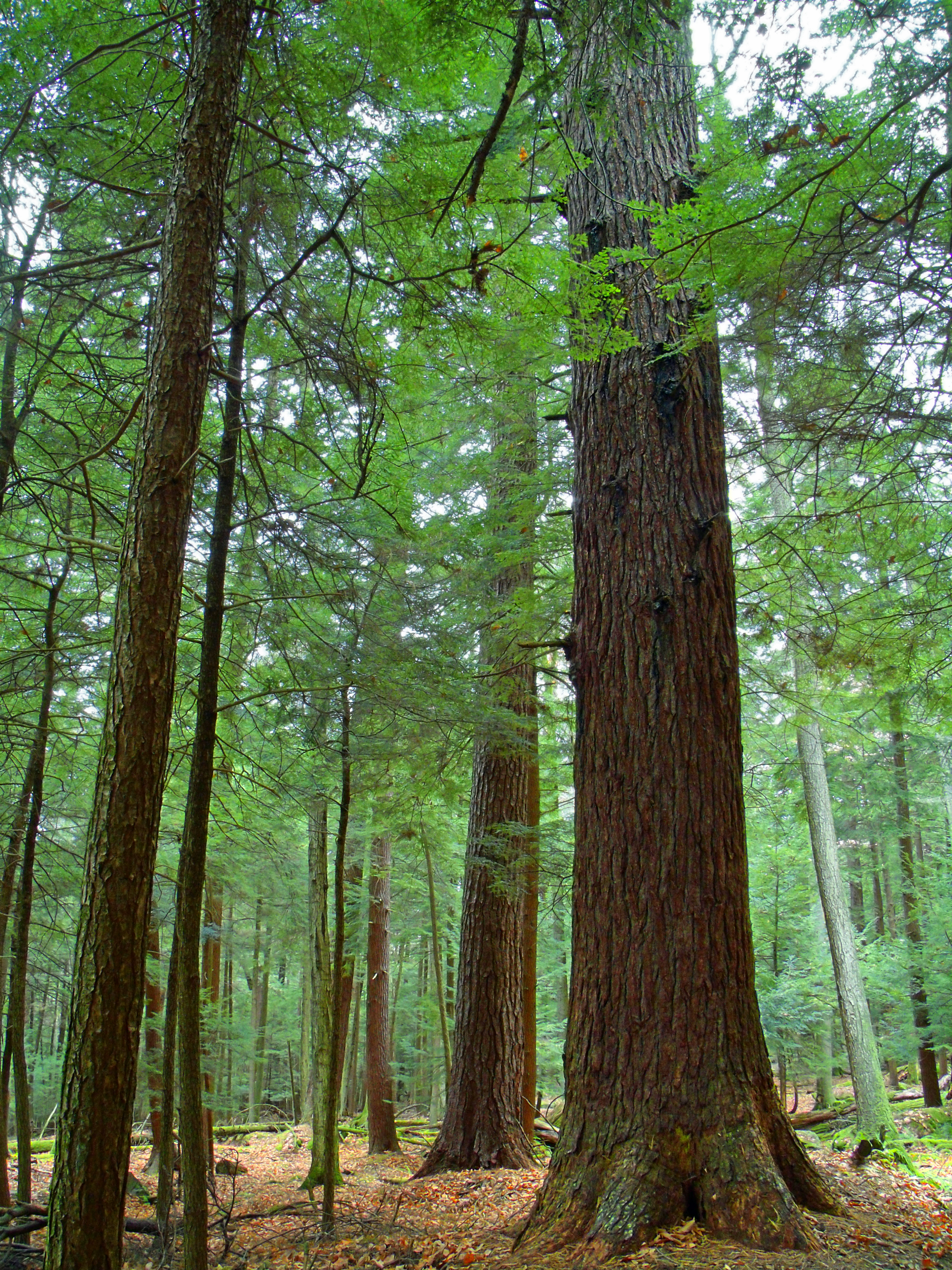
Old growth forest in the park

On April 14, 1927, a bill was signed by Governor John Stuchell Fisher appropriating $450,000 on condition that the Cook Forest Association raise the remaining $200,000 to purchase the 6,055 acres. On December 28, 1928, the funds having been raised by the Cook Forest Association, the Secretary of the Department of Forests and Waters announced the formal purchase.

Money from the Association helped the Commonwealth purchase 6,055 acres (2,450 ha) from A. Cook Sons Company in 1927 for $640,000. Cook Forest became the first Pennsylvania State Park acquired to preserve a natural landmark.

Built in 1929, a firetower was used to spot forest fires. It stands over 80 feet (24 m) tall. While no longer in use, the public can still climb to the top of the stairs. In addition, on rare occasions, the top spotting area will be opened by a guide to allow visitors a closer look.

The Cook Forest State Park Indian Cabin District is a national historic district that includes 11 contributing buildings. They are single room log cabins located on Toms Run behind the park office. They were built by the Civilian Conservation Corps as part of Camp SP-2, which operated in the park from October 1933 to September 1935. These cabins are constructed largely of American chestnut logs which were selected due to both their long-term rot-resistance and the impending local extinction of the species due to chestnut blight.

== Ecology ==
The park is in the Allegheny Highlands forests ecoregion. It is famous for its spectacular stands of old-growth eastern white pine and eastern hemlock, with more white pine over 150 feet (46 m) in its Forest Cathedral than in any other site in the northeastern United States. Many of these ancient trees began growing after a drought and fire in 1644. In total, there are some 1,500 acres (6.1 km^{2}) to 2,000 acres (8.1 km^{2}) of old-growth forests or old forests with old-growth characteristics in several stands throughout the park. In addition to white pine and hemlock, old-growth northern red oak, white oak, black cherry, red maple, sugar maple, American beech, white ash, yellow birch, black birch, and cucumber magnolia also grow throughout the park.

== Recreation ==
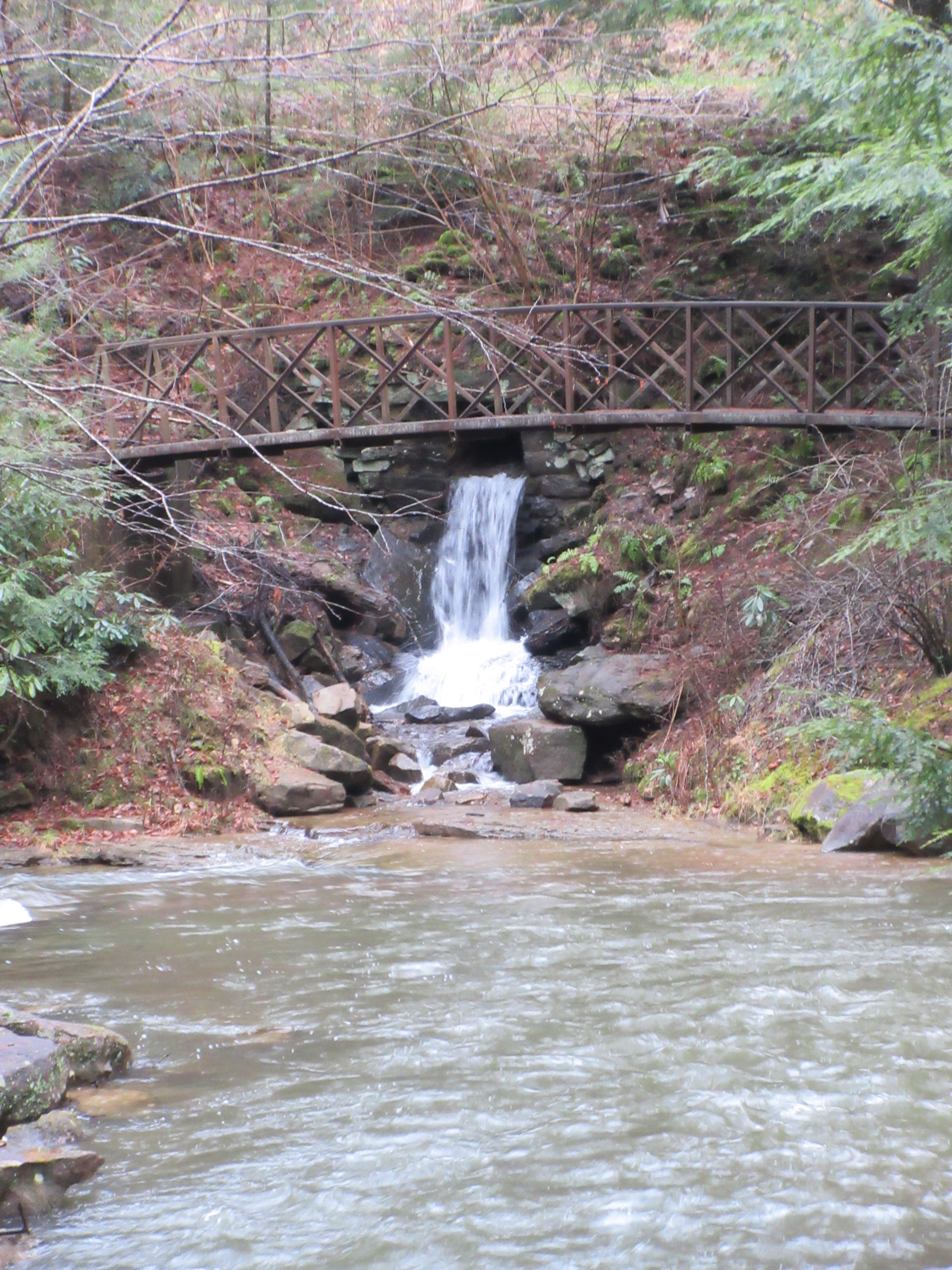
Hiking trail crosses a CCC-era culvert

Cook Forest features 27 marked trails totaling some 29 miles (47 km) for hiking. The terrain is of rolling hills and cool valley streams. Special scenic areas are the old growth forest, Fire Tower/Seneca Point and the Clarion River. Among Cook Forest's primary attractions is the "Forest Cathedral" area of old growth white pine and hemlock, some trees of which top 180 feet (55 m). A somewhat more minor attraction is the short rock "grotto" found in the midst of the mountain-laurel thickets along Seneca trail roughly halfway between the Fire Tower/Seneca Point area and the end of Deer Park Trail. Part of the Baker Trail (140 miles (230 km)) and the North Country National Scenic Trail pass through Cook Forest. The Baker Trail runs from Freeport, in southern Armstrong County, to the Allegheny National Forest. The North Country Trail is under development and will connect the Missouri River in North Dakota with the Adirondack Mountains in New York.

Bikes are permitted on all one-way dirt roads within the park. Biking on hiking trails is not permitted except on the part of the Heffern Run Trail that is part of the Bicycle Route. All children under 12 years of age are required to wear a helmet when biking. Bikes ridden at night must have a light on the bike. The Bicycle Route is 11.5 miles (18.5 km) long and follows lightly traveled roads within the park and Heffern Run Trail. The route is of moderate difficulty with long flat areas and rolling hills. Highlights of the route are a leisurely four-mile flat ride through scenic Tom's Run Valley, CCC-era red and white pine plantations along Forest Drive and a challenging descent along the Heffern Run Trail. A description of the Bicycle Route is available at the park office.

The swimming pool is permanently closed due to lack of funds to sustain it. Visitors may swim in the Clarion River across from the ranger station or anywhere along public park land. Many local businesses provide canoeing and tubing along the relatively shallow and slow-moving river.

Two designated bridle trails off Cemetery Road and portions of Brown's Run Trail comprise 4.5 miles (7.2 km) of trails for horseback riding. Several stables dot the area and are open to the public most of the year; these include Silver Stallion, Pine Crest, and the Cook Forest Scenic Trailride, Dude Ranch, and Campground.

About 5,000 acres (2,000 ha) are open to hunting, trapping, and the training of dogs during established seasons. Common game species in the park are deer, wild turkey, bear, and squirrel. Hunting woodchucks, also known as groundhogs, is prohibited. Dog training is only permitted from the day following Labor Day to March 31 in designated hunting areas. The Department of Conservation and Natural Resources and the Pennsylvania Game Commission rules and regulations apply. Contact the park office for accessible hunting information.

The Clarion River flows along the park border and provides fishing for trout, warm-water game fish and panfish. Many visitors enjoy canoeing or kayaking down the river. There are also businesses that will rent visitors a canoe. About 2.5 miles (4.0 km) of Tom's Run is stocked with trout. A special fishing pond stocked with trout is by the park office and is available for use by children 12 and younger and people with a disability. A level grass bank at the edge of the pond provides easy access. For complete information on fishing rules and regulations in Pennsylvania, visit the Pennsylvania Fish and Boat Commission.

== Education ==
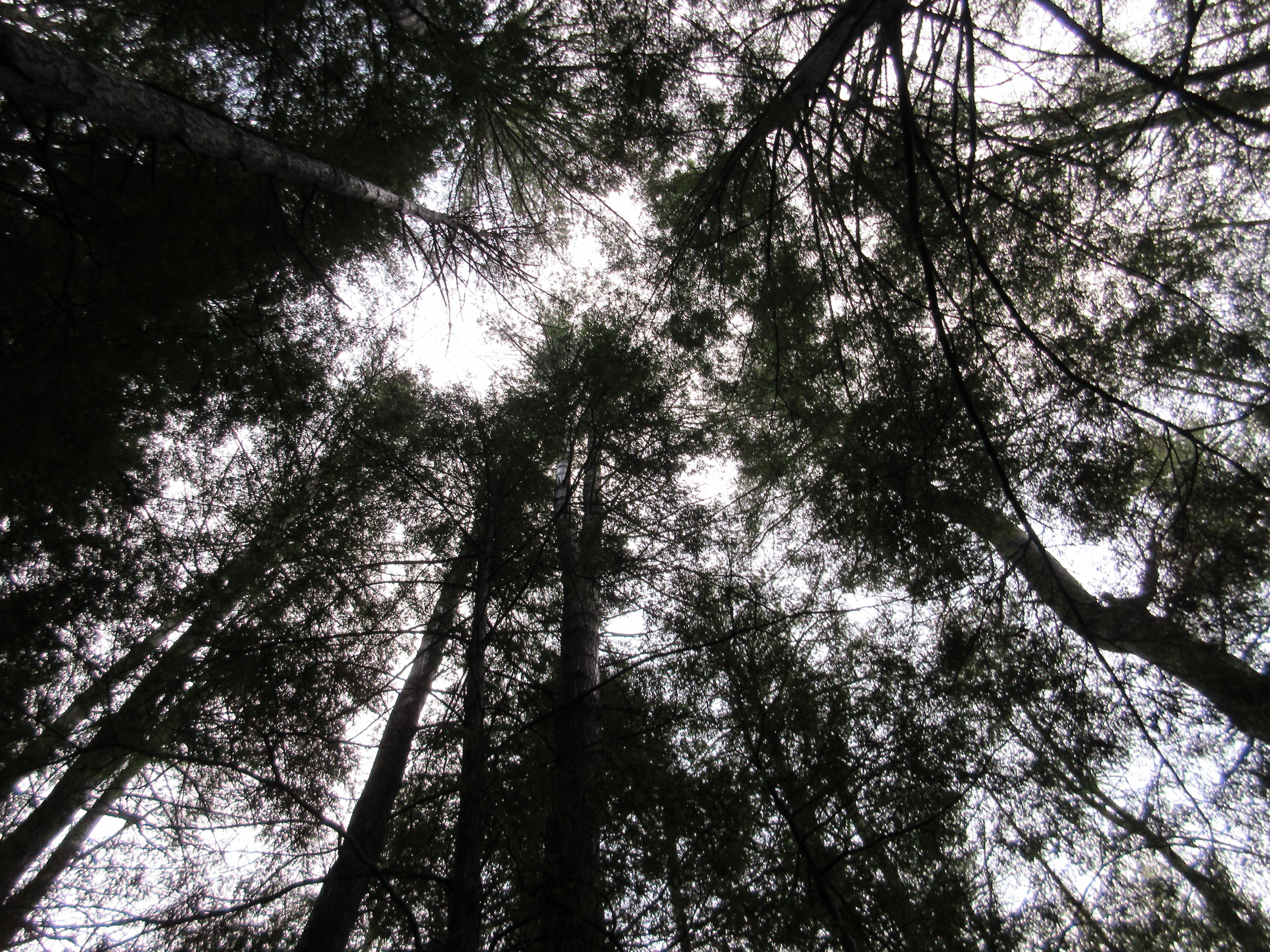
View of the canopy of the old-growth forest

Programs for all ages are offered March to December. Through hands-on activities, guided walks and evening programs, participants gain appreciation, understanding and develop a sense of stewardship toward natural and cultural resources.

Curriculum-based environmental education programs are available to schools and youth groups. Teacher workshops are available. Group programs must be scheduled in advance by calling the park office.

A weekly interpretive schedule is available at the park office. The park has an environmental learning center in the Log Cabin Inn at the Main Picnic Area. The Historical Room displays logging and rafting tools, models and artifacts.

The fire tower is always open for climbing during daylight hours, and the booth at its top is occasionally opened by a ranger for exhibition; check at the park office for a schedule.

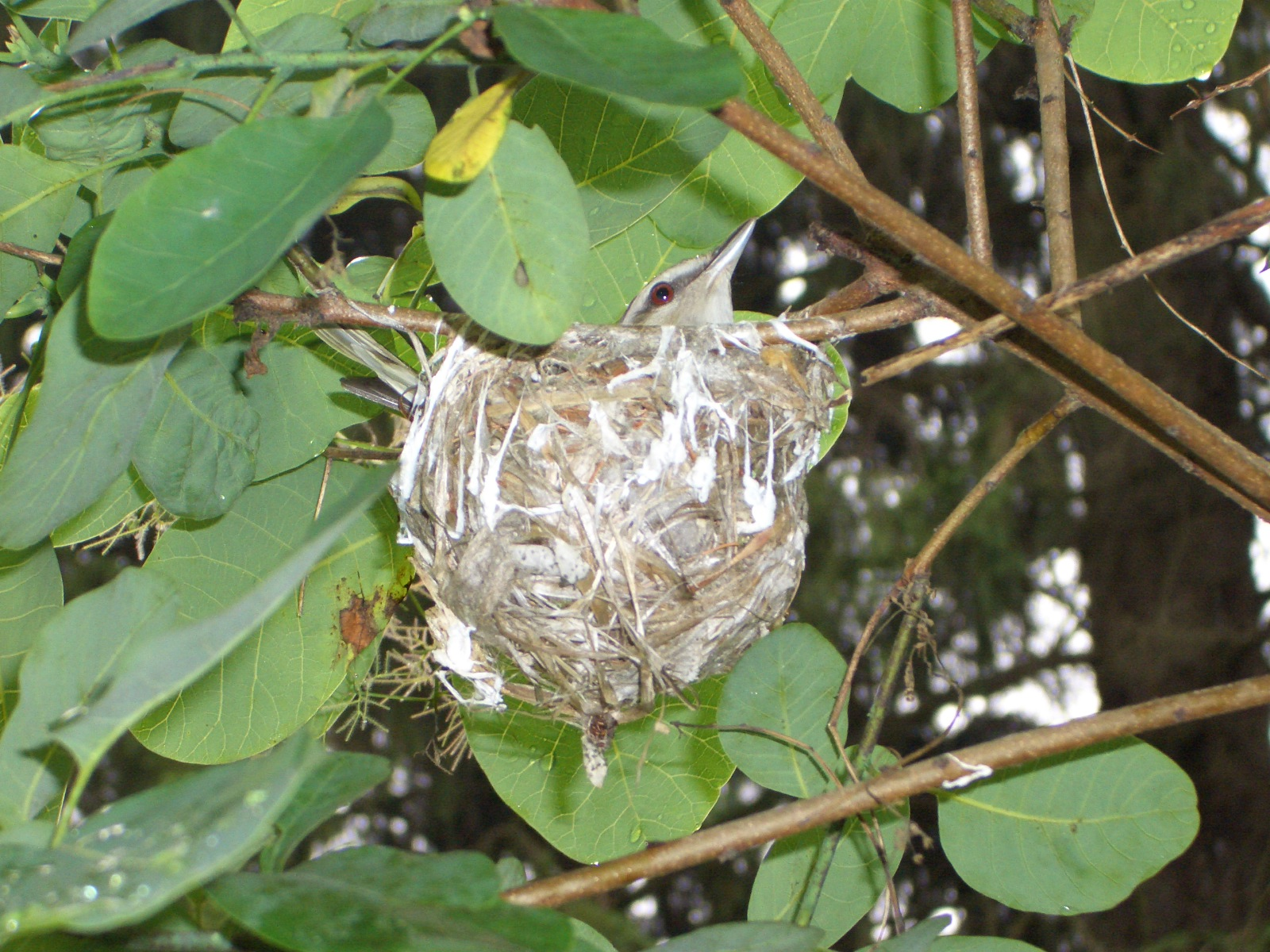
A Red-eyed vireo in its nest at Cook Forest State Park

A local, non-profit craft organization housed in the historic sawmill offers traditional crafts on display, a gift shop and classes. Demonstrations and classes on various crafts are presented throughout the summer and fall seasons for children and adults. The Verna Leith Sawmill Theater seats 180 people and presents plays, musicals and other entertainment throughout the summer season.

== Accommodations ==
The 24 rustic cabins rent from the second Friday in April to late December. All cabins are minimally furnished. Each cabin has beds, mattresses, gas stove, refrigerator, and tables and chairs. Occupants must provide their own bedding, cookware and tableware. Alcoholic beverages and pets are not permitted. There are two cabin areas at Cook Forest. The River Cabins are on a hillside overlooking the Clarion River. Two River Cabins have one room and sleep four people and the other 11 River Cabins have four rooms, a fireplace and sleep six or eight people. The Indian Cabins are along Tom's Run behind the park office. These smaller, one-room cabins sleep four people.

Part of Ridge Campground is open year-round. Winter access is not guaranteed. Modern restrooms with showers are available late May through early October. The 226 tent and trailer campsites have a picnic table and fire ring, and six sites are ADA accessible. There is a sanitary dump station and coin-operated laundry facilities.
