= 1998 Parker Middle School dance shooting =

1998 mass shooting in Edinboro, Pennsylvania

Coordinates: 41.9007°N 80.1280°W

1998 James Parker Middle School dance shooting
- Location: Edinboro, Pennsylvania, U.S.
- Date: April 24, 1998
- Attack type: School shooting, mass shooting
- Weapon: .25-caliber Raven MP-25
- Deaths: 1
- Injuries: 3
- Perpetrator: Andrew Jerome Wurst

The James Parker Middle School dance shooting occurred on April 24, 1998, at a banquet facility in Edinboro, Pennsylvania, United States. Andrew Jerome Wurst, 14, fatally shot 48-year-old John Gillette and wounded another teacher and two students at Nick's Place, a nearby banquet hall during an 8th-grade dinner dance.

Prior to the shooting, Andrew Wurst was described as an average student and somewhat of a loner. One student noticed that he had become curt and unfriendly prior to the shooting, and had told others that he wanted to "kill people and commit suicide". He was later sentenced to 30 to 60 years in prison. He had no diagnosis of mental illness prior to the shooting.

== Shooting ==
Wurst (born February 3, 1984) showed up late to the dance with his father's .25-caliber pistol in a holster belt under his jacket. He had previously left a suicide note under his pillow, and stated to investigators that he planned to go to the dance and kill only himself.

The shooting began on an outdoor patio, about 20 minutes before the dance was scheduled to end, around 21:40. He shot John Gillette once in the face after he asked Wurst to come inside, and then shot him once in the spine. Before running out of ammunition, Wurst proceeded to enter Nick's Place, where the dance had been held, and subsequently fired and wounded teacher Edrye Boraten and two students, Jacob Tury and Robert Zemcheck. The shooting ended when the owner of Nick's Place, James Strand, intervened and confronted Wurst with his shotgun, ordering him to drop his weapon and later holding him at bay for 11 minutes. Strand later got Wurst on the ground, searched him for weapons, and found a dinner fork in his sock.

== Mental condition ==
Wurst was psychotic. At some points, he seems to have thought that everyone was a zombie, already dead. At other times, he said that he was the only real person in the world, with "unreal" people activated only in his presence. He also claimed he was an alien from another planet, brought to earth as an infant. At school, he sometimes referred to himself as "your god, Satan." He had a number of developmental difficulties, reportedly being a bed-wetter as late as age nine. Even at age fourteen he feared monsters in his closet. At school, he wrote stories and made video accounts of fictional murders and suicide.

His attack was planned; he attempted to recruit another student to help with the massacre. He mentioned his scheme to other students days before the shooting. He took the gun, stuck it in his waistband, and left a suicide note as he left home. At the party, he showed the gun to his classmates, none of whom reported it to an adult.

== Trial ==
Wurst's attorneys had considered an insanity defense, but recommended that he pled guilty because it would be hard to convince the jury of an insanity defense.

Wurst was charged with attempted murder, third-degree murder, and first-degree murder, and pleaded guilty in a plea bargain to a lesser charge of third-degree murder along with attempted murder to avoid going to trial, and in an attempt to avoid life imprisonment. He is currently 42 and serving a 30 to 60-year sentence in the State Correctional Institution – Forest. He will be eligible for parole in 2029, when he will be 45 years old.

== See also ==
- List of school shootings in the United States by death toll
- List of school shootings in the United States (before 2000)
