= Marienville, Pennsylvania =

Unincorporated community in Pennsylvania, US

- Census-designated place
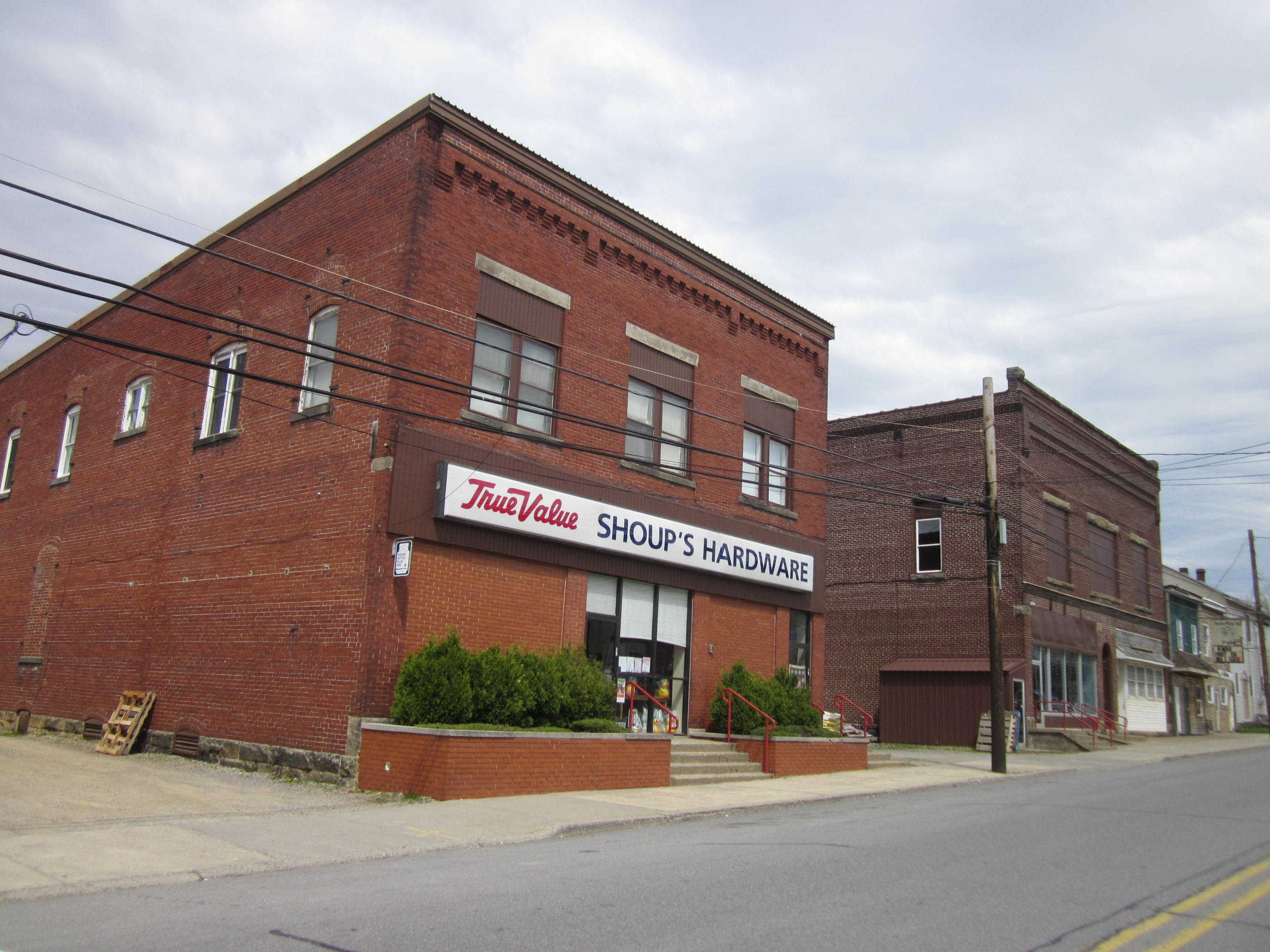
- Marienville, Pennsylvania

- Location within Pennsylvania Location within the United States
- Coordinates: 41°28′8″N 79°7′23″W
- Country: United States
- State: Pennsylvania
- County: Forest
- Township: Jenks

Area
  - Total: 6.06 sq mi (15.69 km^{2})
  - Land: 6.06 sq mi (15.69 km^{2})
  - Water: 0 sq mi (0.00 km^{2})
- Elevation: 1,735 ft (529 m)

Population (2020)
  - Total: 3,362
  - Density: 554.9/sq mi (214.23/km^{2})
- Time zone: UTC-5 (Eastern (EST))
  - Summer (DST): UTC-4 (EDT)
- ZIP code: 16239
- FIPS code: 42-47416
- GNIS feature ID: 1213633

Marienville is an unincorporated community and census-designated place (CDP) in Jenks Township, Forest County, Pennsylvania, United States. Its altitude is 1,735 feet (529 m), and it is located at 41°28′12″N 79°7′29″W (41.4702014, -79.1247623). Other names for the community have included "Marion" and "Marionville". Marienville is a major point on a well-known ATV trail. According to the 2010 census the population of Marienville was 3,137.

Marienville is the location of the SCI Forest state correctional institution.

== Geography ==
The community is in southeastern Forest County near the center of Jenks Township. Pennsylvania Route 66 is the main street, leading northeast 24 miles (39 km) to U.S. Route 6 at Kane and southwest 27 miles (43 km) to Interstate 80 near Clarion. Pennsylvania Route 899 leads south from Marienville 10 miles (16 km) to Clarington.

According to the U.S. Census Bureau, the Marienville CDP has a total area of 6.1 square miles (15.7 km^{2}), all land.

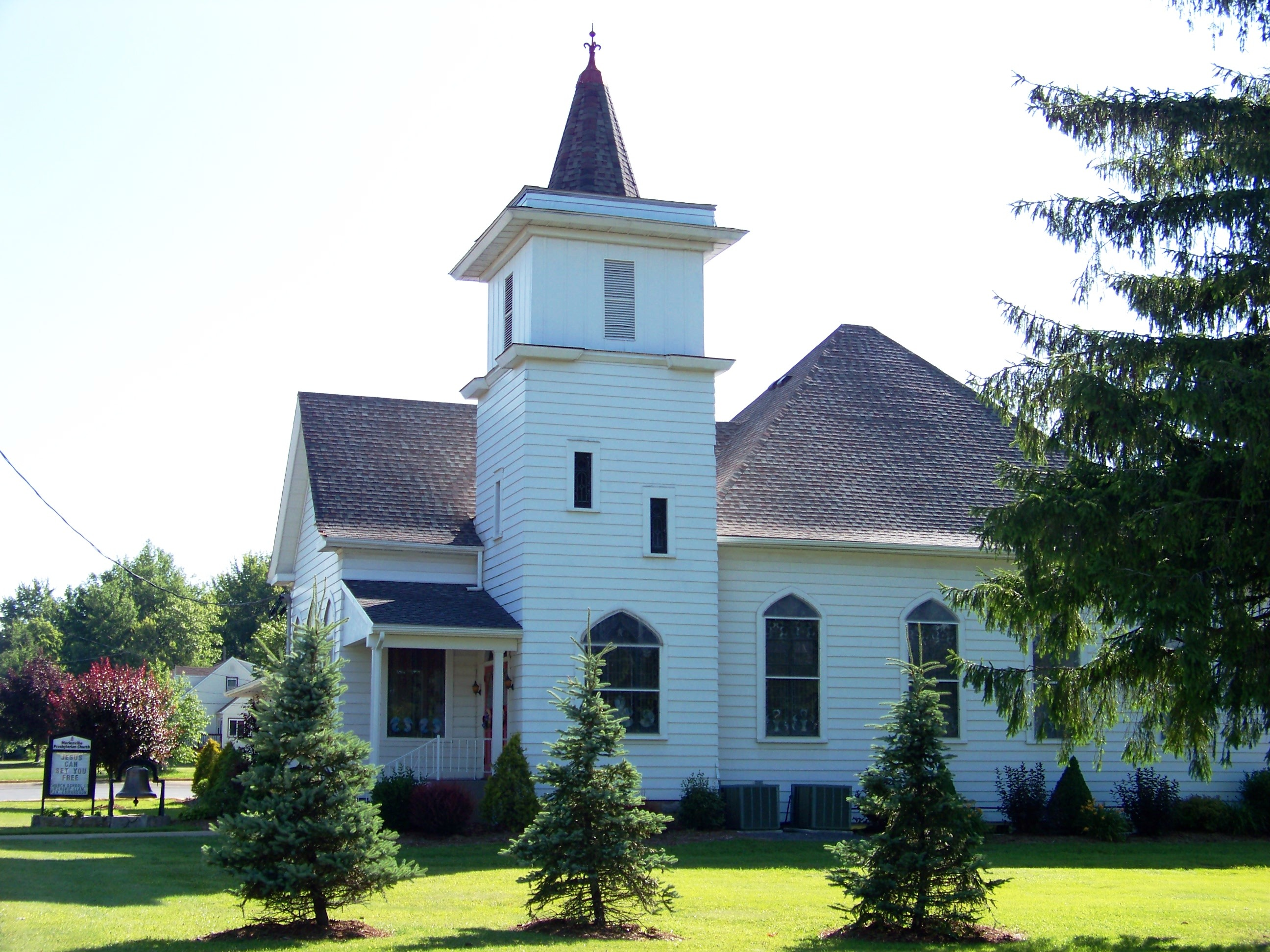
Marienville Presbyterian Church

== Demographics ==
Historical population
Census	Pop.	Note	%±
2010	3,137		—
2020	3,362		7.2%
U.S. Decennial Census

=== 2020 census ===
As of the 2020 census, Marienville had a population of 3,362. The median age was 37.7 years. 2.7% of residents were under the age of 18 and 9.0% of residents were 65 years of age or older. For every 100 females there were 863.3 males, and for every 100 females age 18 and over there were 958.9 males age 18 and over.

0.0% of residents lived in urban areas, while 100.0% lived in rural areas.

There were 360 households in Marienville, of which 15.0% had children under the age of 18 living in them. Of all households, 46.4% were married-couple households, 26.4% were households with a male householder and no spouse or partner present, and 20.8% were households with a female householder and no spouse or partner present. About 37.8% of all households were made up of individuals and 20.5% had someone living alone who was 65 years of age or older.

There were 596 housing units, of which 39.6% were vacant. The homeowner vacancy rate was 3.5% and the rental vacancy rate was 12.2%.

Racial composition as of the 2020 census
Race	Number	Percent
White	1,850	55.0%
Black or African American	1,214	36.1%
American Indian and Alaska Native	4	0.1%
Asian	5	0.1%
Native Hawaiian and Other Pacific Islander	0	0.0%
Some other race	273	8.1%
Two or more races	16	0.5%
Hispanic or Latino (of any race)	278	8.3%
