= Clarington, Pennsylvania =

Unincorporated community in Pennsylvania, US

- Unincorporated community
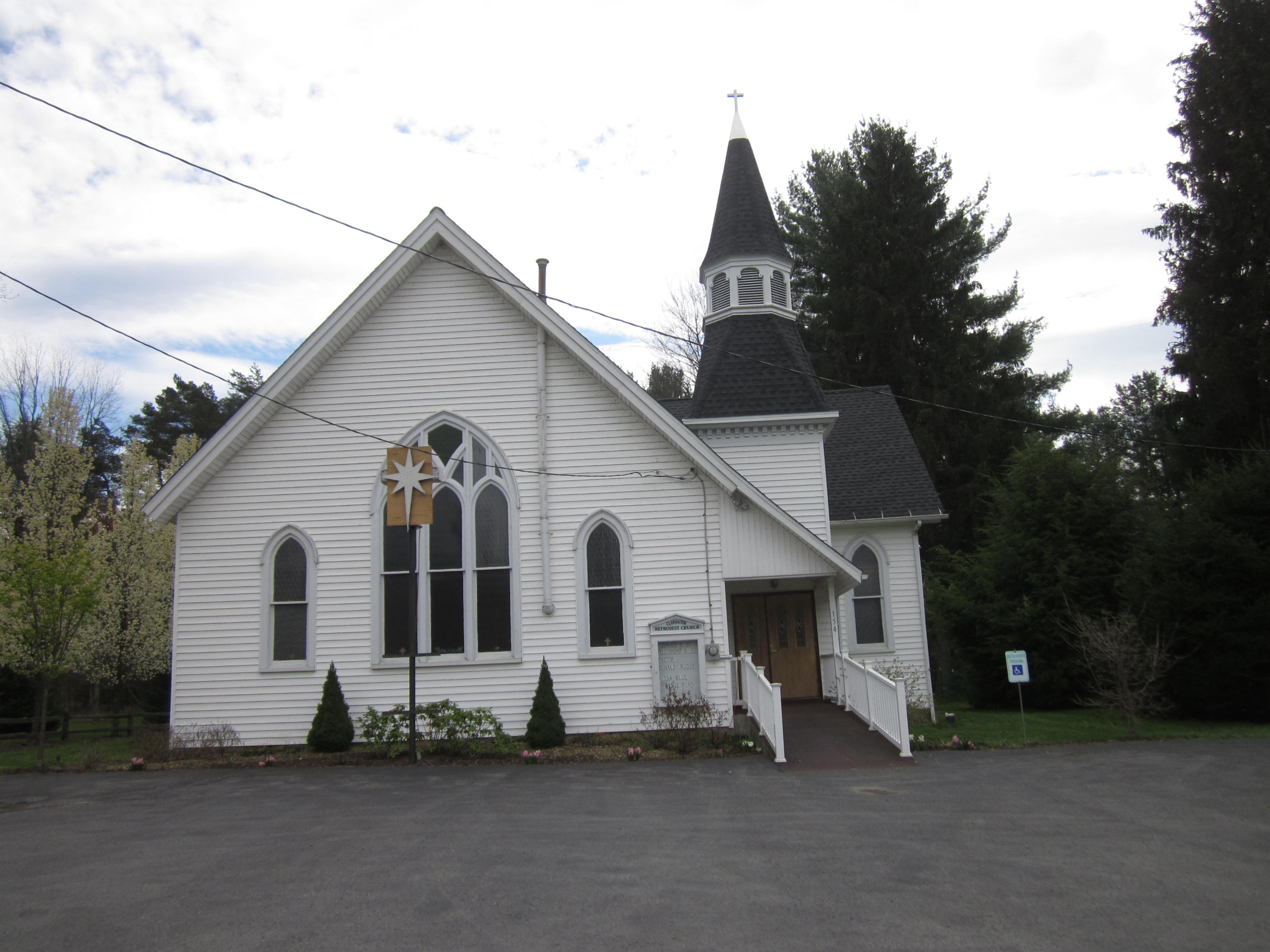
- Clarington Methodist Church

- Location within Pennsylvania Location within the United States
- Coordinates: 41°19′57″N 79°07′23″W
- Country: United States
- State: Pennsylvania
- County: Forest
- Township: Barnett
- Elevation: 1,201 ft (366 m)
- Time zone: UTC-5 (Eastern (EST))
  - Summer (DST): UTC-4 (EDT)
- ZIP code: 15828
- Area code: 814
- GNIS feature ID: 1209504

Clarington is an unincorporated community in the township of Barnett, in Forest County, Pennsylvania, United States. The community is located on the north bank of the Clarion River at the Pennsylvania Route 899 bridge, 12 miles (19 km) north of Brookville. Clarington had a post office until it closed on February 20, 2004; it still has its own ZIP code, 15828.
