= Forest County, Pennsylvania =

County in Pennsylvania, United States

- County
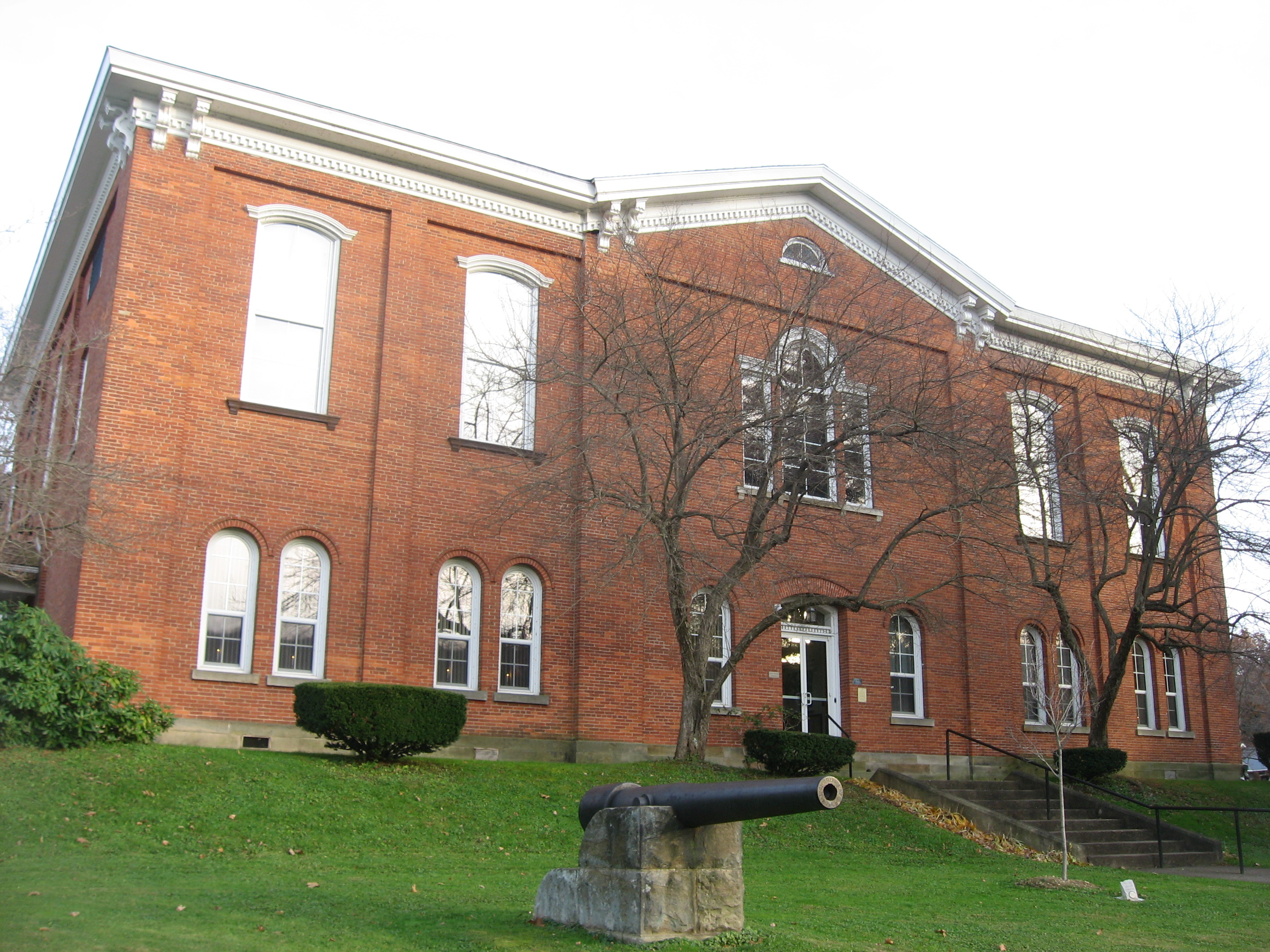
- Forest County Courthouse in Tionesta

- Logo

- Location within the U.S. state of Pennsylvania
- Coordinates: 41°31′N 79°14′W
- Country: United States
- State: Pennsylvania
- Founded: September 1, 1857
- Seat: Tionesta
- Largest community: Marienville

Area
  - Total: 430 sq mi (1,100 km^{2})
  - Land: 427 sq mi (1,110 km^{2})
  - Water: 3.3 sq mi (8.5 km^{2}) 0.8%

Population (2020)
  - Total: 6,973
  - Estimate (2025): 6,614 ▼
  - Density: 15.5/sq mi (6.0/km^{2})
- Time zone: UTC−5 (Eastern)
  - Summer (DST): UTC−4 (EDT)
- Congressional district: 15th
- Website: www.co.forest.pa.us

Forest County is a county in the Commonwealth of Pennsylvania. As of the 2020 census, the population was 6,973, making it the third-least populous county in Pennsylvania. Its county seat is Tionesta. The county was created in 1848 and later organized in 1857. The county is part of the North Central region of the commonwealth. (Note: Includes Clearfield, Jefferson, Tioga, McKean, Warren, Clarion, Elk, Potter, Forest and Cameron Counties)

== History ==
Forest County was created on April 11, 1848, from part of Jefferson County. The county was enlarged on October 31, 1866, when part of Venango County was incorporated into the county. Forest County was named for the forests contained within its limits.

== Geography ==
According to the U.S. Census Bureau, the county has a total area of 430 square miles (1,100 km^{2}), of which 427 square miles (1,110 km^{2}) is land and 3.3 square miles (8.5 km^{2}) (0.8%) is water. It has a warm-summer humid continental climate (Dfb) and average monthly temperatures in Tionesta range from 25.3 °F in January to 69.8 °F in July.

=== Adjacent counties ===
- Warren County (north)
- McKean County (northeast)
- Elk County (east)
- Jefferson County (south)
- Clarion County (south)
- Venango County (west)

=== National protected area ===
Part of Allegheny National Forest covers Forest County. Part of Allegheny Islands Wilderness is in Forest County.

=== State protected area ===
Part of Cook Forest State Park is in Forest County. Part of Cornplanter State Forest is in Forest County.

=== Major highways ===
- US 62
- PA 36
- PA 66
- PA 127
- PA 227
- PA 666
- PA 899
- PA 948

== Demographics ==
Historical population
Census	Pop.	Note	%±
1860	898		—
1870	4,010		346.5%
1880	4,385		9.4%
1890	8,482		93.4%
1900	11,039		30.1%
1910	9,435		−14.5%
1920	7,477		−20.8%
1930	5,180		−30.7%
1940	5,791		11.8%
1950	4,944		−14.6%
1960	4,485		−9.3%
1970	4,926		9.8%
1980	5,072		3.0%
1990	4,802		−5.3%
2000	4,946		3.0%
2010	7,716		56.0%
2020	6,973		−9.6%
2025 (est.)	6,614	▼	−5.1%
U.S. Decennial Census; 1790-1960 1900–90; 1990–00 2010–20 2025

=== Racial and ethnic composition ===
Forest County, Pennsylvania – Racial and ethnic composition Note: the US Census treats Hispanic/Latino as an ethnic category. This table excludes Latinos from the racial categories and assigns them to a separate category. Hispanics/Latinos may be of any race.
Race / Ethnicity (NH = Non-Hispanic)	Pop 1980	Pop 1990	Pop 2000	Pop 2010	Pop 2020	% 1980	% 1990	% 2000	% 2010	% 2020
White alone (NH)	5,024	4,722	4,719	5,850	5,278	99.05%	98.33%	95.41%	75.82%	75.69%
Black or African American alone (NH)	11	43	110	1,374	1,235	0.22%	0.90%	2.22%	17.81%	17.71%
Native American or Alaska Native alone (NH)	13	11	19	11	8	0.26%	0.23%	0.38%	0.14%	0.11%
Asian alone (NH)	7	3	6	12	17	0.14%	0.06%	0.12%	0.16%	0.24%
Native Hawaiian or Pacific Islander alone (NH)	x	x	0	1	0	x	x	0.00%	0.01%	0.00%
Other race alone (NH)	2	0	4	5	4	0.04%	0.00%	0.08%	0.06%	0.06%
Mixed race or Multiracial (NH)	x	x	28	45	108	x	x	0.57%	0.58%	1.55%
Hispanic or Latino (any race)	15	23	60	418	323	0.30%	0.48%	1.21%	5.42%	4.63%
Total	5,072	4,802	4,946	7,716	6,973	100.00%	100.00%	100.00%	100.00%	100.00%

=== 2020 census ===
As of the 2020 census, the county had a population of 6,973. The median age was 45.4 years. 9.3% of residents were under the age of 18 and 21.6% of residents were 65 years of age or older. For every 100 females there were 236.4 males, and for every 100 females age 18 and over there were 252.6 males age 18 and over.

The racial makeup of the county was 76.0% White, 17.7% Black or African American, 0.1% American Indian and Alaska Native, 0.3% Asian, <0.1% Native Hawaiian and Pacific Islander, 4.0% from some other race, and 1.9% from two or more races. Hispanic or Latino residents of any race comprised 4.6% of the population.

<0.1% of residents lived in urban areas, while 100.0% lived in rural areas.

There were 2,034 households in the county, of which 17.2% had children under the age of 18 living in them. Of all households, 47.4% were married-couple households, 25.0% were households with a male householder and no spouse or partner present, and 22.1% were households with a female householder and no spouse or partner present. About 36.8% of all households were made up of individuals and 19.4% had someone living alone who was 65 years of age or older.

There were 6,949 housing units, of which 70.7% were vacant. Among occupied housing units, 83.1% were owner-occupied and 16.9% were renter-occupied. The homeowner vacancy rate was 2.2% and the rental vacancy rate was 9.7%.

=== 2000 census ===
As of the 2000 census, there were 4,946 people, 2,000 households, and 1,328 families residing in the county. The population density was 12 people per square mile (4.6 people/km^{2}). There were 8,701 housing units at an average density of 20 units per square mile (7.7/km^{2}). The racial makeup of the county, largely a result of the SCI Forest State Penitentiary, was 77.4% White, 21.1% Black or African American, 0.40% Native American, 0.14% Asian, 0.69% from other races, and 0.61% from two or more races. 1.21% of the population were Hispanic or Latino of any race. 19.9% were of German, 9.0% Irish, 6.2% English ancestry.

There were 2,000 households, out of which 23.20% had children under the age of 18 living with them, 55.70% were married couples living together, 6.70% had a female householder with no husband present, and 33.60% were non-families. 29.10% of all households were made up of individuals, and 15.10% had someone living alone who was 65 years of age or older. The average household size was 2.29 and the average family size was 2.81.

In the county, the population was spread out, with 22.70% under the age of 18, 5.90% from 18 to 24, 22.60% from 25 to 44, 28.90% from 45 to 64, and 19.90% who were 65 years of age or older. The median age was 44 years. For every 100 females there were 111.20 males. For every 100 females age 18 and over, there were 102.30 males. According to a 2025 Census Bureau survey, Forest County had the highest percentage of unmarried adults of any county in the Mid-Atlantic, Northeastern, Appalachian, and Great Lakes regions of the United States.

== Law and government ==
United States presidential election results for Forest County, Pennsylvania
Year	Republican		Democratic		Third party(ies)	
Year	No.	%	No.	%	No.	%
1888	917	57.24%	612	38.20%	73	4.56%
1892	938	54.31%	660	38.22%	129	7.47%
1896	1,224	57.74%	805	37.97%	91	4.29%
1900	1,309	61.25%	714	33.41%	114	5.33%
1904	1,328	68.14%	411	21.09%	210	10.77%
1908	1,119	60.91%	512	27.87%	206	11.21%
1912	240	15.38%	373	23.91%	947	60.71%
1916	617	47.03%	463	35.29%	232	17.68%
1920	993	56.36%	389	22.08%	380	21.57%
1924	1,130	71.20%	280	17.64%	177	11.15%
1928	1,707	84.59%	289	14.32%	22	1.09%
1932	1,090	63.34%	569	33.06%	62	3.60%
1936	1,757	59.50%	1,157	39.18%	39	1.32%
1940	1,811	66.19%	919	33.59%	6	0.22%
1944	1,344	65.95%	673	33.02%	21	1.03%
1948	1,209	62.29%	687	35.39%	45	2.32%
1952	1,511	69.92%	627	29.01%	23	1.06%
1956	1,535	71.13%	622	28.82%	1	0.05%
1960	1,497	64.19%	828	35.51%	7	0.30%
1964	900	41.78%	1,249	57.99%	5	0.23%
1968	1,172	59.40%	669	33.91%	132	6.69%
1972	1,374	71.75%	509	26.58%	32	1.67%
1976	1,135	51.90%	1,017	46.50%	35	1.60%
1980	1,206	56.12%	819	38.11%	124	5.77%
1984	1,468	63.36%	839	36.21%	10	0.43%
1988	1,159	56.13%	895	43.34%	11	0.53%
1992	801	37.36%	890	41.51%	453	21.13%
1996	902	40.98%	964	43.80%	335	15.22%
2000	1,371	60.05%	843	36.93%	69	3.02%
2004	1,571	61.06%	989	38.44%	13	0.51%
2008	1,366	55.35%	1,038	42.06%	64	2.59%
2012	1,383	59.51%	896	38.55%	45	1.94%
2016	1,684	69.59%	626	25.87%	110	4.55%
2020	1,882	70.91%	728	27.43%	44	1.66%
2024	1,902	71.50%	724	27.22%	34	1.28%

United States Senate election results for Forest County, Pennsylvania1
Year	Republican		Democratic		Third party(ies)	
Year	No.	%	No.	%	No.	%
1994	1,096	57.59%	722	37.94%	85	4.47%
2000	1,406	62.52%	786	34.95%	57	2.53%
2006	938	47.69%	1,029	52.31%	0	0.00%
2012	1,356	58.93%	884	38.42%	61	2.65%
2018	1,201	62.16%	693	35.87%	38	1.97%
2024	1,808	68.25%	741	27.97%	100	3.78%

United States Senate election results for Forest County, Pennsylvania3
Year	Republican		Democratic		Third party(ies)	
Year	No.	%	No.	%	No.	%
1992	1,101	51.28%	944	43.97%	102	4.75%
1998	1,052	68.09%	442	28.61%	51	3.30%
2004	1,533	62.27%	752	30.54%	177	7.19%
2010	1,121	59.91%	750	40.09%	0	0.00%
2016	1,502	63.27%	708	29.82%	164	6.91%
2022	1,434	65.72%	694	31.81%	54	2.47%

Pennsylvania Gubernatorial election results for Forest County
Year	Republican		Democratic		Third party(ies)	
Year	No.	%	No.	%	No.	%
1970	880	54.09%	728	44.74%	19	1.17%
1974	979	55.91%	755	43.12%	17	0.97%
1978	974	49.82%	972	49.72%	9	0.46%
1982	1,050	56.15%	810	43.32%	10	0.53%
1986	966	53.76%	813	45.24%	18	1.00%
1990	595	34.96%	1,104	64.86%	3	0.18%
1994	1,197	63.07%	480	25.29%	221	11.64%
1998	987	63.80%	375	24.24%	185	11.96%
2002	1,170	64.43%	613	33.76%	33	1.82%
2006	1,059	53.27%	929	46.73%	0	0.00%
2010	1,257	66.51%	633	33.49%	0	0.00%
2014	820	50.15%	815	49.85%	0	0.00%
2018	1,159	59.80%	746	38.49%	33	1.70%
2022	1,340	61.13%	825	37.64%	27	1.23%

=== Law enforcement ===
As of 2016 all areas in the county use the Pennsylvania State Police (PSP) in a law enforcement capacity, either with part-time police departments or with no other police departments.

=== Voter registration ===
As of February 5, 2024, there are 3,159 registered voters in Forest County.

Chart of Voter Registration
1. Republican (61.9%)
2. Democratic (26.8%)
3. Independent (7.28%)
4. Third Party (4.05%)
- Republican: 1,944 (61.86%)
- Democratic: 847 (26.81%)
- Independent: 230 (7.28%)
- Third Party: 128 (4.05%)

=== State Senate ===
- Scott E. Hutchinson, Republican, Pennsylvania's 21st Senatorial District

=== State House of Representatives ===
- Donna Oberlander, Republican, Pennsylvania's 63rd Representative District
- Kathy L. Rapp, Republican, Pennsylvania's 65th Representative District

=== United States House of Representatives ===
- Glenn Thompson, Republican, Pennsylvania's 15th congressional district

=== United States Senate ===
- Dave McCormick, Republican
- John Fetterman, Democrat

== Education ==
The Forest Area School District serves the entire Forest County.

Private schools:

- Cornell Abraxas I Arlene Lissner (9th-12th) Marienville

Libraries:

- Marienville Area Library - Marienville
- Sarah Stewart Bovard Memorial Library - Tionesta

== Communities ==
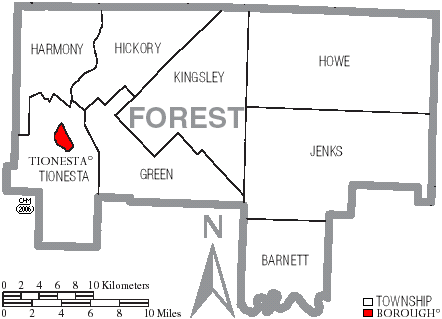
Map of Forest County, Pennsylvania with Municipal Labels showing Boroughs (red) and Townships (white).

Under Pennsylvania law, there are four types of incorporated municipalities: cities, boroughs, townships, and, in at most two cases, towns. The following boroughs and townships are located in Forest County:

=== Borough ===
- Tionesta (county seat)

=== Townships ===
- Barnett
- Green
- Harmony
- Hickory
- Howe
- Jenks
- Kingsley
- Tionesta

=== Census-designated place ===
- Marienville

=== Unincorporated communities ===
- Brookston
- Clarington
- Cooksburg‡
- East Hickory
- Endeavor
- Porkey
- West Hickory

=== Population ranking ===
The population ranking of the following table is based on the 2010 census of Forest County. The jump in census figures between the 2000 and 2010 census, is due in a large part to the opening of the State Correctional Institution - Forest (SCI - Forest) in October 2004. SCI Forest houses approximately 2,200 inmates at their facility in Marienville, PA.

† county seat

Rank	City/Town/etc.	Population (2010 Census)	Municipal type	Incorporated
1	Marienville	3,137	CDP	
2	† Tionesta	483	Borough	1805

== See also ==
- National Register of Historic Places listings in Forest County, Pennsylvania
