= Clarion River =

River in Pennsylvania, United States

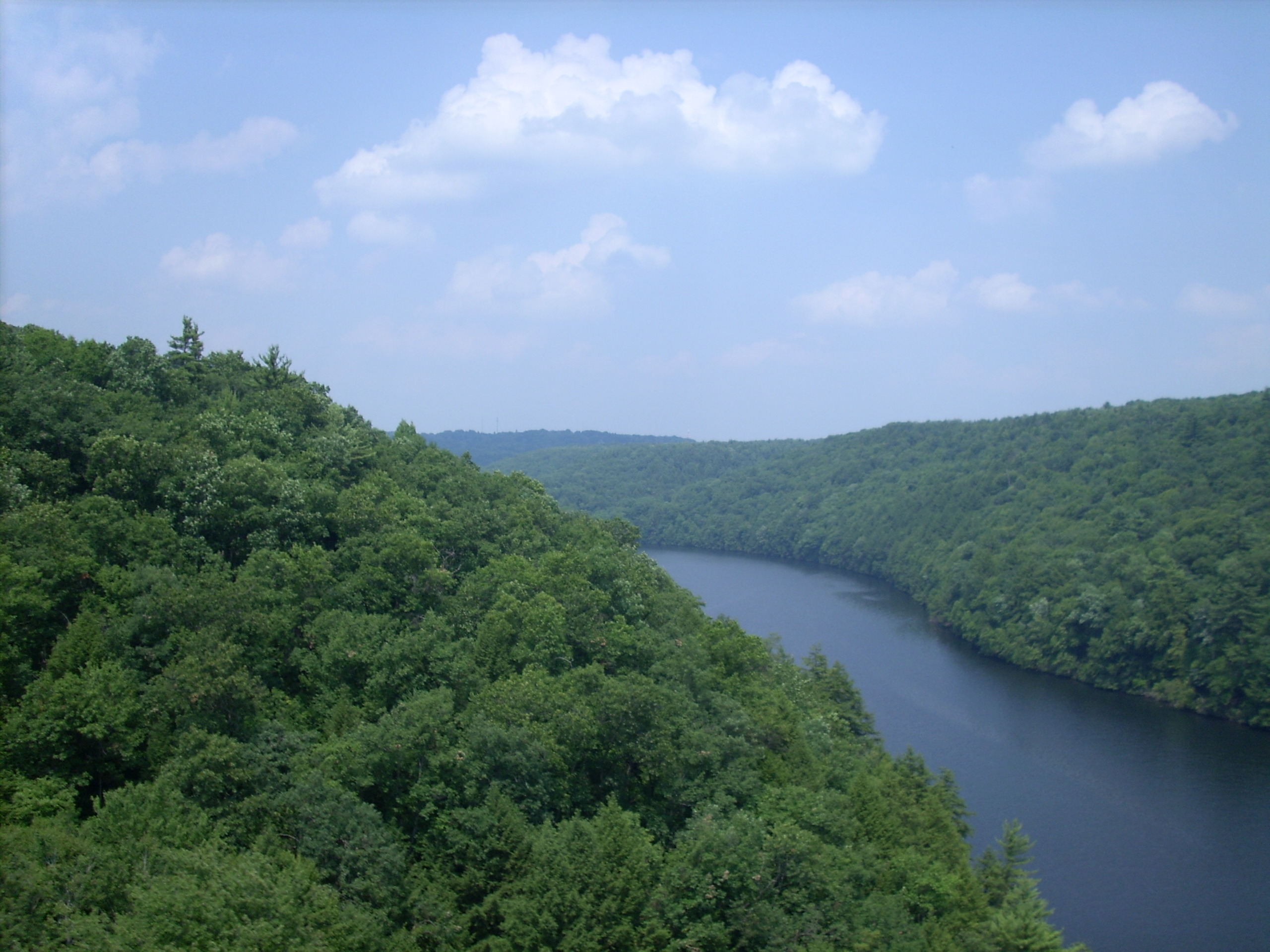
- The Clarion River flows beneath I-80 (looking upstream).

Location
- Country: United States

Physical characteristics
- Source
  - coordinates: 41.4911727°N 78.6780816°W
- Mouth
  - coordinates: 41.1164511°N 79.6750488°W
  - elevation: 850 ft (260 m)

Basin features
- River system: Allegheny River

National Wild and Scenic River
- Type: Scenic, Recreational
- Designated: October 19, 1996

The Clarion River is a tributary of the Allegheny River, approximately 110 mi (177 km) long, in west central Pennsylvania in the United States. It drains a rugged area of the Allegheny Plateau in the Ohio River watershed, flowing through narrow serpentine valleys and hardwood forests.

== Course ==
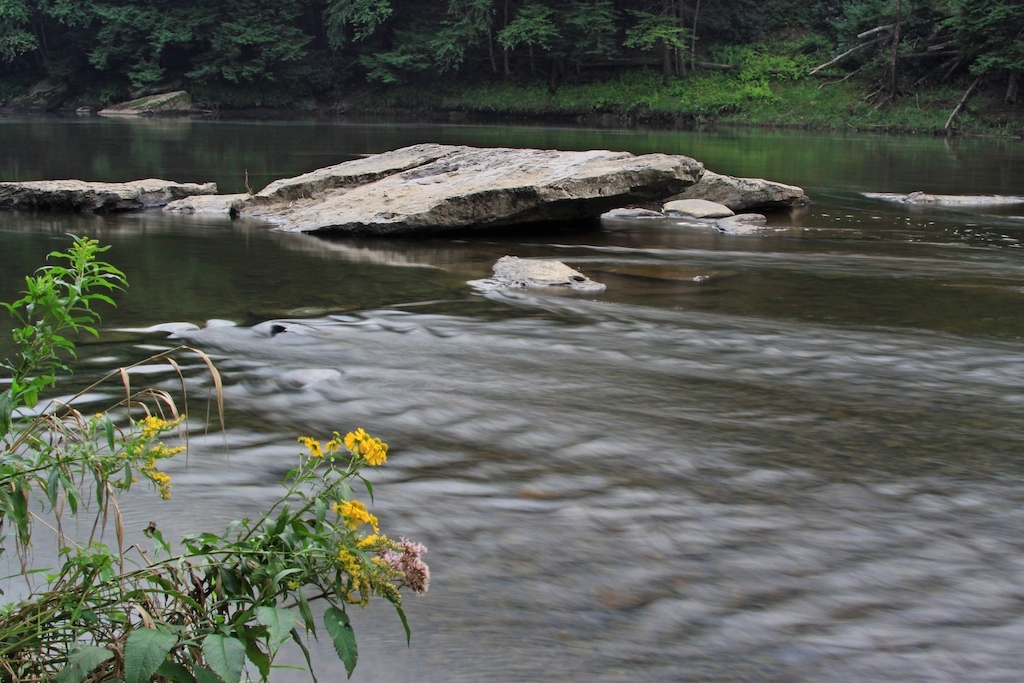
Clarion River in Cook Forest State Park

The river is formed at Johnsonburg in central Elk County by the confluence of its East and West Branches. The East Branch, approximately 15 mi (24 km) long, rises in northeastern Elk County and flows southwest through East Branch Clarion River Lake to join the West Branch. The river flows generally west-southwest across western Pennsylvania in a tight meandering course past Ridgway and Clarion. It joins the Allegheny from the east in western Clarion County approximately 5 mi (8 km) south of Emlenton.

The Clarion is a designated part of the National Wild and Scenic River program.

== Discharges ==
River	Location	Discharge
East Branch Clarion River	East Branch Clarion River Dam	148 cu ft/s (4.2 m^{3}/s)
West Branch Clarion River	Wilcox	128 cu ft/s (3.6 m^{3}/s)
Clarion River	St. Petersburg	2,248 cu ft/s (63.7 m^{3}/s)

== History ==
Before 1817, the Clarion River was more commonly called "Tobeco," likely a corruption of Tuppeek-hanne, meaning the stream that flows from a large spring. The French explorers named the river Rivière au Fiel. Settlers called it the Toby or Stump Creek as early as 1809. The name Clarion was given by surveyor Daniel Stanard in 1817, who said the water sounded like a distant clarion.

At the end of the 19th century and into the beginning of the 20th century, much of what is now the Allegheny National Forest and surrounding areas were deforested, in part to make way for the oil boom that followed Edwin Drake's discovery of oil near Titusville on August 27, 1859, but also for wood chemicals. Bark was in especially high demand for local tanneries that produced prodigious amounts of leather. This deforestation significantly degraded the watershed of the upper Allegheny in general, leading to floods downstream (particularly in Pittsburgh), and eventually to the declaration of the national forest in 1923, but in the case of the Clarion River, run-off from tanneries compounded the problem, as did acid mine drainage. The Clarion was an important part of the timber industry, allowing timber to be transported downstream to the Allegheny, then the Ohio, and ultimately the Mississippi. The Clarion River came to be Pennsylvania's most polluted waterway.

The regrowth of the forest did much to help restore the Clarion River, as well as a major cleaning effort in the 1980s. Today, the river is used for fishing, canoeing, and other recreational activities, and runs through extensive wildlife and forest areas, including a 4,241-acre (17.16 km^{2}) inventoried roadless area that has been proposed as a wilderness area. In 1996, a 51.7-mile (83.2 km) stretch of the Clarion River was designated a National Wild & Scenic River. The bridge at Cooksburg is in Clarion County in its western portion, passes through a narrow spike of Forest County in its middle, and is in Jefferson County at its east end.

USS Clarion River (LSM(R)-409) was an LSM(R)-401-class medium-type landing ship (LSM) built for the United States Navy during World War II.

== See also ==
- List of National Wild and Scenic Rivers
- List of rivers of Pennsylvania
- List of tributaries of the Allegheny River
- Wilderness Act
