= Henry Smith =

Henry Smith may refer to:

== Politics and government ==
=== Australia ===
- Henry Gilbert Smith (1802–1886), politician
- Henry Teesdale Smith (1858–1921), businessman and politician

=== Canada ===
- Henry Smith (Frontenac County politician) (1812–1868), lawyer and politician
- Henry Dolphus Smith (1819–1889), politician

=== United Kingdom ===
- Henry Smith (regicide) (1620–1668), politician and jurist
- Sir Henry Babington Smith (1863–1923), civil servant
- Sir Henry Moncrieff Smith (1873–1951), British administrator in India
- Sir Henry Abel Smith (1900–1993), British Army officer and governor of Queensland
- Henry Wilson Smith (1904–1978), civil servant
- Henry Smith (British politician) (born 1969), member of parliament for Crawley
- Henry Smith, 5th Viscount Hambleden (born 1955), British peer

=== United States ===
- Henry Smith (Rhode Island governor) (1766–1818), governor of Rhode Island
- Henry Smith (Texas governor) (1788–1851), governor of Texas
- Henry G. Smith (1807–1878), justice of the Tennessee Supreme Court
- Henry K. Smith (1811–1854), mayor of Buffalo, New York
- Henry Smith (speaker) (1829–1884), speaker of the New York State Assembly
- Henry Smith (Wisconsin politician) (1838–1916), United States representative from Wisconsin
- Henry Augustus Middleton Smith (1853–1924), United States federal judge
- Henry C. Smith (politician) (1856–1911), United States representative from Michigan
- Henry C. Smith (judge) (1862–1932), justice of the Montana Supreme Court
- Henry P. Smith III (1911–1995), United States representative from New York

=== Other countries ===
- Henry L. Smith (1898–?), Garda Síochána (Irish police force)

== Religion ==
- Henry Smith (priest) (1705–1765), Irish Anglican priest
- Henry Smith (preacher) (c.1560–c.1591), English Puritan preacher
- Henry Boynton Smith (1815–1877), American theologian
- Henry Weston Smith (1827–1876), American preacher
- Henry Preserved Smith (1847–1927), American Biblical scholar
- Henry Goodwin Smith (1860–1940), American theologian
- C. Henry Smith (1875–1948), Mennonite historian

== Science and academia ==
- Henry Lilley Smith (1787/89–1859), English surgeon
- Henry Spencer Smith (1812–1901), English surgeon
- Henry John Stephen Smith (1826–1883), Irish mathematician
- Henry A. Smith (1830–1915), American physician and poet
- Henry George Smith (1852–1924), Australian chemist
- Henry Louis Smith (1859–1951), president of Davidson College
- Henry Nash Smith (1906–1986), American professor, founder of American Studies
- Henry Smith (Egyptologist) (1928–2024), British Egyptologist and academic
- Henry "Jullundur" Smith (1859–1948), Irish ophthalmologist

== Sports ==
- Henry Smith (discus thrower) (1955–2020), Samoan Olympic athlete
- Henry Smith (long jumper) (born 1996), Australian long jumper
- Henry Smith (footballer, born 1870) (1870-?), English footballer, see List of Manchester City F.C. players (1–24 appearances)
- Henry Smith (footballer, born 1882) (1882–1957), Australian rules footballer
- Henry Smith (footballer, born 2002), Australian rules footballer
- Henry Tyrell-Smith (1907–1982), Irish motorcyclist
- Henry Smith (Scottish footballer) (born 1956), Scottish football goalkeeper
- Henry Smith (American football) (born 1983), American football player
- Henry Smith (baseball), Negro leagues baseball player

== Other people ==
- Henry Smith (moneylender) (1549-1628), English businessman and charity founder
- Henry Walton Smith (1738–1792), English businessman, founder of W H Smith
- Henry Smith (attorney) (1774–?), English lawyer and amateur artist
- Henry More Smith ([fl. 1814), Canadian escape artist, confidence man
- Henry Smith (Royal Navy officer) (1803–1887), British naval officer
- Henry Smith (VC) (1825–1862), English winner of the Victoria Cross during the Indian Mutiny
- Henry Pember Smith (1854–1907), American painter
- Henry Clay Smith (1874–1945), American architect
- Henry Justin Smith (1875–1936), American newspaper editor
- Henry Smith (lynching victim) (1876–1893), American black man killed by a mob in Paris, Texas
- Henry Holmes Smith (1909–1986), American photographer
- Henry Smith (police officer) (1835–1921), British police officer
- Henry Smith, Death Row Records employee murdered in a drive-by shooting

== Other uses ==
- SS Henry B. Smith, a steel-hulled, propeller-driven lake freighter built in 1906

== See also ==
- Harry Smith (disambiguation)
- Hal Smith (disambiguation)
- Henry Smyth (disambiguation)
