= Harry Smith =

Harry Smith may refer to:

== Sport ==
=== Baseball ===
- Harry Smith (infielder) (1856–1898), American baseball player
- Harry Smith (pitcher) (1889–1964), American baseball player
- Harry Smith (1900s catcher) (1874–1933), British-born baseball player & manager
- Harry Smith (1910s catcher) (1890–1922), American baseball player

=== Cricket ===
- Harry Smith (Australian cricketer) (1887–1916), Australian cricketer, played first-class cricket for Tasmania and Victoria
- Harry Smith (cricketer, born 1884) (1884–1935), South African cricketer
- Harry Smith (cricketer, born 1886) (1886–1955), English cricketer, for Derbyshire and Warwickshire
- Harry Smith (cricketer, born 1890) (1890–?), English cricketer, played first-class cricket for Essex
- Harry Smith (cricketer, born 1891) (1891–1937), English Test cricketer

=== Football ===
- Harry Smith (American football) (1918–2013), American football player
- Harry Smith (footballer, born 1885) (1885–?), footballer for Stoke and Walsall
- Harry Smith (footballer, born 1893) (1893–1960), Australian rules footballer for Fitzroy and Geelong
- Harry Smith (footballer, born 1894), English footballer for Northampton Town
- Harry Smith (footballer, born 1901), English footballer for Clapton Orient
- Harry Smith (footballer, born 1904) (1904–?), English footballer for West Ham United
- Harry Smith (footballer, born 1908) (1908–1993), English footballer for Nottingham Forest, Darlington and Bristol Rovers
- Harry Smith (footballer, born 1916) (1916–1983), Australian rules footballer for Richmond
- Harry Smith (footballer, born 1930) (1930–2020), English footballer for Chester in 1950s
- Harry Smith (footballer, born 1932) (1932–2016), English footballer for Torquay United and Bristol City
- Harry Smith (footballer, born 1995), English footballer for Swindon Town
- Harry Smith (rugby league) (born 2000), rugby league footballer
- Harry Smith (rugby union) (1873–1957), Scottish rugby union player
- Harry Smith (soccer) (1907–1983), American soccer full back
- Harry Smith (Scottish footballer) (1911–?), Scottish footballer

=== Other sports ===
- Harry Smith (bowler) (1930–2021), American ten-pin bowler
- Harry Smith (coach), Tampa Bay Buccaneers strength coach (1976–1979)
- Harry Smith (ice hockey, born 1935) (1935–2020), Canadian ice hockey player
- Harry Smith (ice hockey, born 1883) (1883–1953), Canadian ice hockey player
- Harry Smith (runner) (1888–1962), American marathoner and great-grandfather of pro wrestler Harry Smith
- Harry Smith, known as Davey Boy Smith Jr. (born 1985), Canadian professional wrestler and great-grandson of American marathoner Harry Smith
- Harry A. Smith (1869–1928), American insurance executive and college football player and coach

== Arts ==
- Harry B. Smith (1860–1936), American songwriter
- Harry Everett Smith (1923–1991), American music anthologist, experimental film maker, visual artist
- Harry James Smith (1880–1918), American playwright and novelist
- Harry Smith (poet) (1936–2012), American poet and editor

== Journalism ==
- Harry Clay Smith (1863–1941), African American newspaper editor and politician
- Harry Leslie Smith (1923–2018), British writer and political commentator
- Harry Smith (American journalist) (born 1951), US broadcast journalist
- Harry Smith (British journalist) (1951–2020), British broadcast journalist

== Military ==
- Sir Harry Smith, 1st Baronet (1787–1860), British Army officer
- Harry Smith (Australian soldier) (1933–2023), Australian Army officer

== Politics ==
- Harry Smith (MP) (1829–1910), British politician in Falkirk Burghs
- Harry Smith (Alberta politician) (1873–1928), Canadian politician

== Science and academia ==
- Harry Scott Smith (1883–1957), American entomologist
- Harry Smith (microbiologist) (1921–2011), British microbiologist
- Harry Smith (Egyptologist) (1928–2024), British Egyptologist and academic
- Harry Smith (botanist) (1935–2015), British botanist

== Places ==
- Harrismith, a large town in Free State province, South Africa, named after the 1st Baronet
- Harrismith, Western Australia

== Other ==
- Harry Lester Smith, American Methodist bishop

== See also ==
- Henry Smith (disambiguation)
- Harold Smith (disambiguation)
- Harrison Smith (disambiguation)
- Harry Smyth (1910–1992), Canadian speed skater
- Harry Smythe (1904–1980), baseball player
