= Harold Smith =

Harold Smith may refer to:

== Entertainment ==
- Harold Jacob Smith (1912–1970), American screenwriter
- Harold J. Smith (1912–1980), TV actor better known as Jay Silverheels
- Harold Smith (Twin Peaks), fictional television character
- Harold W. Smith, one of the main characters in the novel series The Destroyer

== Politics ==
- Harold Smith (New Zealand politician) (1866–1936), New Zealand MP
- Harold Smith (British politician) (1876–1924), MP for Warrington, 1910–1922, and Liverpool Wavertree, 1922–1923
- Harold Gengoult Smith (1890–1983), Australian medical practitioner and Lord Mayor of Melbourne
- Harold D. Smith (1898–1947), American budget director during World War II
- Harold Palmer Smith Jr. (1935–2025), assistant secretary of Defense

== Science ==
- Harold Hill Smith (1910–1994), American geneticist
- Harold Smith (scientist) (born 1954), founder and CEO of OyaGen

== Sports ==
- Harold Smith (diver) (1909–1958), American diver and Olympic gold medalist
- Harold Smith (gridiron football) (born 1962), American football player
- Harold Smith (sprinter) (born 1893), American sprinter also known as Harold Carman, 2nd in the 220 yards at the 1915 USA Outdoor Track and Field Championships

== Other ==
- Harold Page Smith (1904–1993), United States Navy admiral
- J. Harold Smith (1910–2001), Southern Baptist evangelist
- Harold Smith (detective) (1926–2005), art detective

== See also ==
- Whatever Happened to Harold Smith?, a 1999 British film
- Hal Smith (disambiguation)
