= James Augustus Rooth =

British Army medical officer

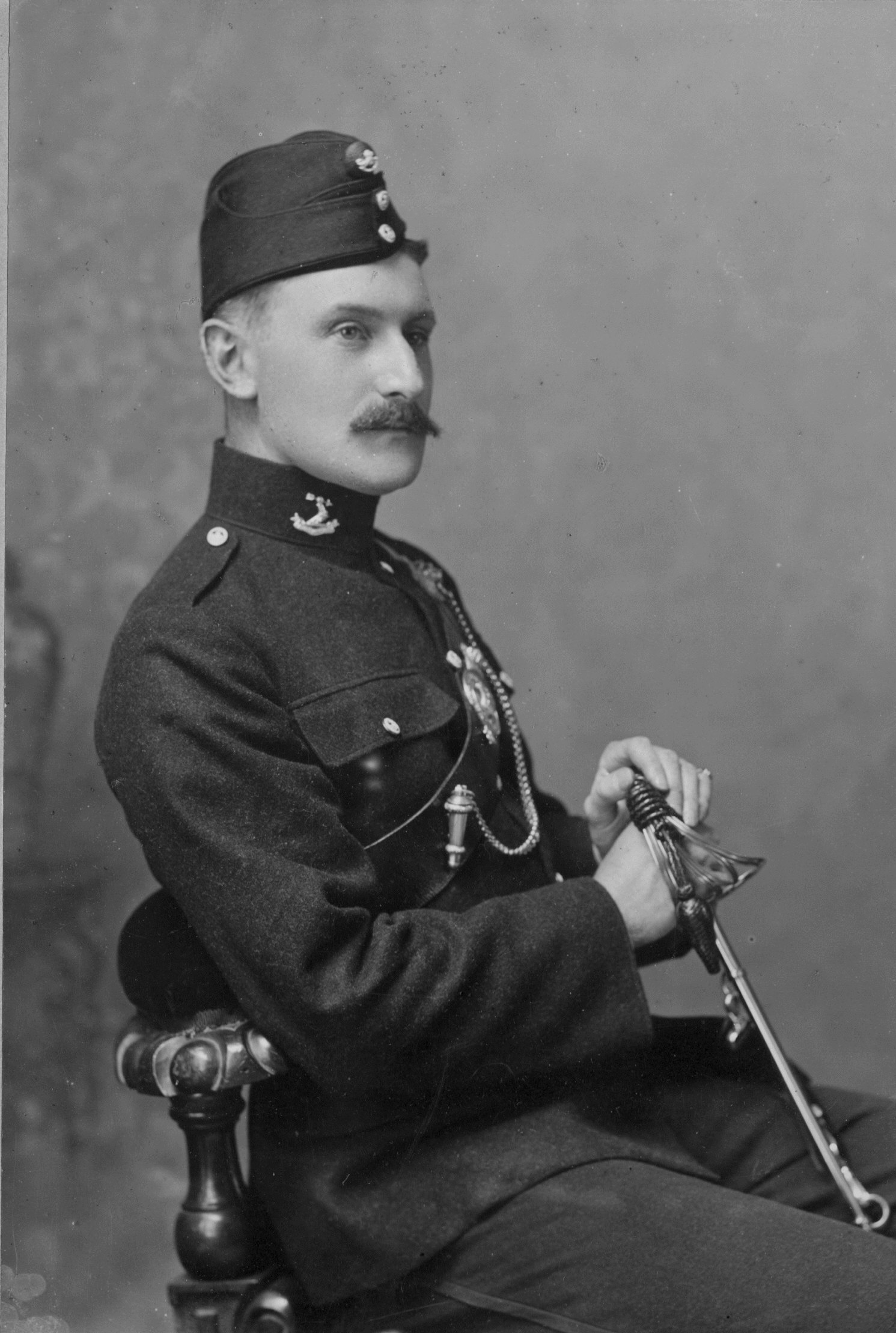
- Born: January 1869; London, England. United Kingdom
- Died: 25 October 1963 (aged 94); Hove, Sussex
- Occupations: Physician, colonel
- Medical career
- Institutions: Radcliffe Infirmary, Oxford

Colonel James Augustus Rooth MRCS LRCP (13 January 1869 – 25 October 1963) was a British colonel and physician who was a member of the Royal Army Medical Corps, a member of the Royal College of Surgeons, and house surgeon at the Radcliffe Infirmary, Oxford.

== Biography ==
Rooth was born in London in January 1869. He was the son of John Wilcoxon Rooth, barrister-at-law (1835–1874), and Elizabeth Cody (1825–1917), daughter of Henry Smith of Bristol. He was baptised 20 January at St Paul's Church, Camden Square.

Rooth was educated at Highgate School and University College University of Oxford where he read history (BA 1890). In 1918 he was court-martialled and dismissed from the Royal Army Medical Corps under mysterious circumstances. However, as a keen amateur photographer, notably of nude youths, (he also wrote for photographic journals), one possible reason suggests itself.

That same year of 1918, Rooth married Beatrice de Putron.

Rooth was best known as the doctor in charge of the delivery of future vaudevillian and film actors Violet and Daisy Hilton, conjoined twins born in Brighton in 1908 and the first to live to adulthood. He provided a medical testimony of them for the British Medical Journal in 1911.

He died aged 94, in Hove, Sussex, in 1963.
