= Bishop Smith =

Bishop Smith may refer to:

- Dabney Tyler Smith (1953–2024), American Episcopal bishop of Southwest Florida
- Harry Lester Smith (elected 1920), American bishop of the Methodist Episcopal Church and The Methodist Church
- John Mortimer Smith (1935–2019), Roman Catholic Bishop of Pensacola–Tallahassee (1991–1995) and Trenton, New Jersey (1997–2010)
- William Angie Smith (1894–1974), Bishop of The Methodist Church and the United Methodist Church

== See also ==
- Archbishop Smith (disambiguation)
