= Hal Smith =

Hal Smith may refer to:

== Baseball players ==
- Hal Smith (pitcher) (1902–1992), American in MLB between 1932 and 1935
- Hal W. Smith (1930–2020), American in MLB between 1955 and 1964
- Hal R. Smith (1931–2014), American in MLB between 1956 and 1965

== Others ==
- Hal Smith (screenwriter) (1912–1970), American Academy Award winner for The Defiant Ones
- Hal Smith (actor) (1916–1994), American who played Otis on The Andy Griffith Show
- Hal Smith (American football) (born 1935), defensive tackle in 1957 NFL draft

== See also ==
- Harold Smith (disambiguation)
- Harry Smith (disambiguation)
- Henry Smith (disambiguation)
- Hank Smith (disambiguation)
