= Chained for Life =

Chained for Life may refer to:

- Chained for Life (1952 film), an exploitation film
- Chained for Life (2019 film), an American drama film
