= Anne Rogers Minor =

American clubwoman (1864–1947)

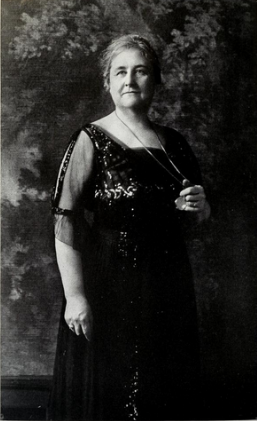
- Anne Rogers Minor, from a 1918 publication

11th President General of the National Society Daughters of the American Revolution
- In office 1920–1923
- Preceded by: Sarah Elizabeth Mitchell Guernsey
- Succeeded by: Lora Haines Cook

Personal details
- Born: Anne Rogers; April 7, 1864 East Lyme, Connecticut
- Died: October 24, 1947 (aged 83) Waterford, Connecticut
- Relatives: Henry Pember Smith (cousin)
- Occupation: Clubwoman, artist

Anne Rogers Minor (April 7, 1864 – October 24, 1947) was an American clubwoman, innkeeper, and landscape painter. She was President General of the Daughters of the American Revolution (DAR) from 1920 to 1923, and the first New England woman to hold that position.

== Early life ==
Anne Rogers was born in East Lyme, Connecticut, the daughter of James Chapman Rogers and Nancy Hazeltine Beckwith Rogers. She studied painting with her older cousin Henry Pember Smith and with Henry Ward Ranger.

== Career ==
In 1888 Rogers opened the Konomoc Inn, a summer hotel in Waterford, Connecticut. Her landscape paintings were regularly exhibited in Connecticut, including at the Connecticut Academy of Fine Arts in 1917 and 1944, and at the New Haven Paint and Clay Club in 1920. She had a solo show in 1922 at the Arts Club of Washington, and had paintings displayed at the National Academy of Design in New York in 1924.

Minor first joined the Daughters of the American Revolution in Connecticut in 1894. In 1910, she helped produce an Italian-language guide for immigrants, La Guida, published by the state organization, a model for the later DAR Manual for Citizenship distributed for free at Ellis Island and other entry points. She gave lectures and held events with the Connecticut DAR, especially during and after World War I, when she spoke against anti-war and disarmament efforts. Minor addressed the national organization's meeting in 1918 with a lecture titled "The Deeper Meaning of Our Daughters of the American Revolution Organization", outlining the claim of the DAR to "special privileges under our government".

Minor was elected president of the national DAR in 1920, with no opposition, the first New England woman to hold that position. During her three years in office, she lectured nationally against Bolshevism. Under her tenure, the organization expanded its headquarters in Washington, D.C. She represented the DAR at the 1921 dedication of the equestrian statue of Jeanne D'Arc in Washington, a gift from France to the United States after World War I. She wrote a foreword to Ethel J. R. C. Noyes, The Women of the Mayflower and Women of Plymouth Colony (1921).

In her later years, Minor served on the board of directors for the Connecticut State Farm for Women (the state's only women's prison), and successfully advocated for a chapel for the inmates. She also served on the Connecticut Tercentenary Commission, as a trustee of the American International College and the Connecticut College for Women, and as president of the New London County Historical Society.

== Personal life and legacy ==
Anne Rogers married physician George Maynard Minor in 1895. Their only child, George, died in 1905. She died in 1947, in Waterford, Connecticut, aged 83 years. The national DAR awarded the Anne Rogers Minor Prize for winners of their annual essay contest. Her paintings are still found in auction catalogs, and in 2020 the national DAR reported that they had restored twelve paintings by Minor in their collection.
