= Hilton sisters =

The Hilton sisters may refer to:

- Paris Hilton and Nicky Hilton heirs to the Hilton Hotels Corporation estate
- Hilton twins, conjoined twins born in 1908
