= Hank Smith =

Hank Smith may refer to:

- Hank Smith (animator), American animator
- Hank A. Smith (1893–1985), American football player
- Hank Smith (singer) (1934–2002), Canadian country music singer

== See also ==
- Harry Smith (disambiguation)
- Hal Smith (disambiguation)
- Henry Smyth (disambiguation)
