= Lloydsville, Ohio =

Unincorporated community in Ohio, U.S.

Coordinates: 40°04′12″N 80°59′54″W

Lloydsville is an unincorporated community in Belmont County, in the U.S. state of Ohio. As of the 2020 census, Lloydsville had a population of 280.

== History ==
A former variant name was Loydsville. Lloydsville or Loydsville was laid out in 1831 by Joshua Loyd, and named for him. A post office called Lloydsville was established in 1832, and remained in operation until it was discontinued in 1907.

== Notable people ==
- Lora Haines Cook, 12th President General of the Daughters of the American Revolution
