= Harry Smith (Australian cricketer) =

Australian cricketer

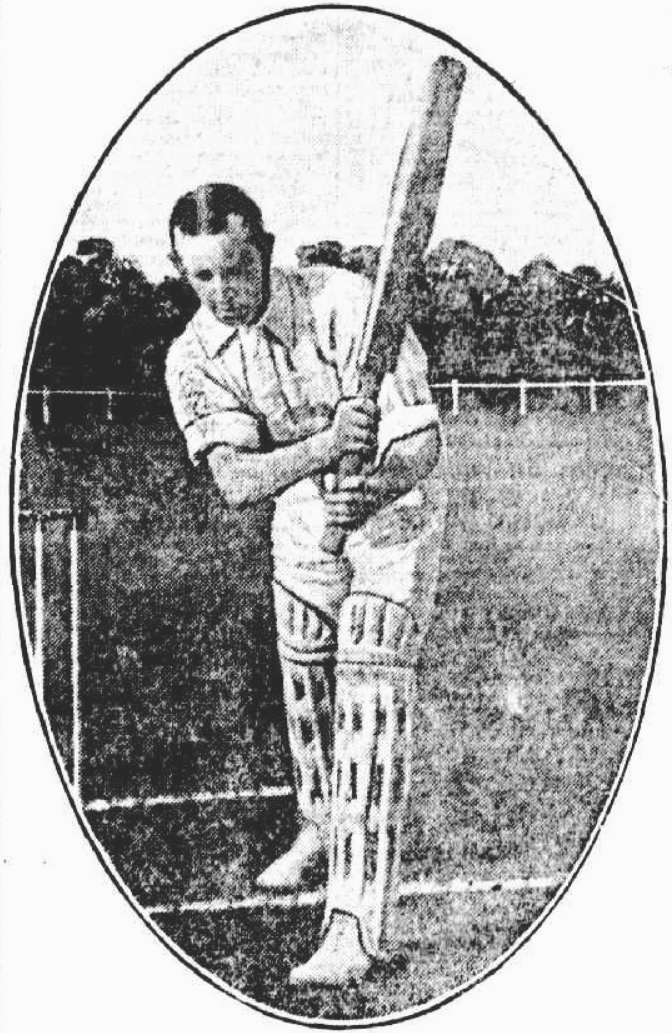

Personal information
- Born: 27 October 1887; Launceston, Tasmania, Australia
- Died: 24 August 1916 (aged 28); Pinewood, Berkshire, England

Domestic team information
- Years: Team
- 1907–08 to 1914–15: Tasmania
- 1912–13: Victoria
- Source: Cricinfo, 18 November 2015

Harry Smith (27 October 1887 – 24 August 1916) was an Australian cricketer. He played four first-class cricket matches for Tasmania from 1907–08 to 1914–15 and one match for Victoria in 1912–13.

== See also ==
- List of Victoria first-class cricketers
- List of Tasmanian representative cricketers
