= Harrison Smith (disambiguation) =

Harrison Smith (born 1989) is an American football player.

Harrison Smith may also refer to:

- Harrison Smith (runner) (1876–1947), American track and field athlete
- Harrison Smith, founder of publishers Smith and Haas, bought by Random House in 1936
- Harrison Patrick Smith, musician known professionally as The Dare

== See also ==
- Harry Smith (disambiguation)
