= Pinewood Hospital =

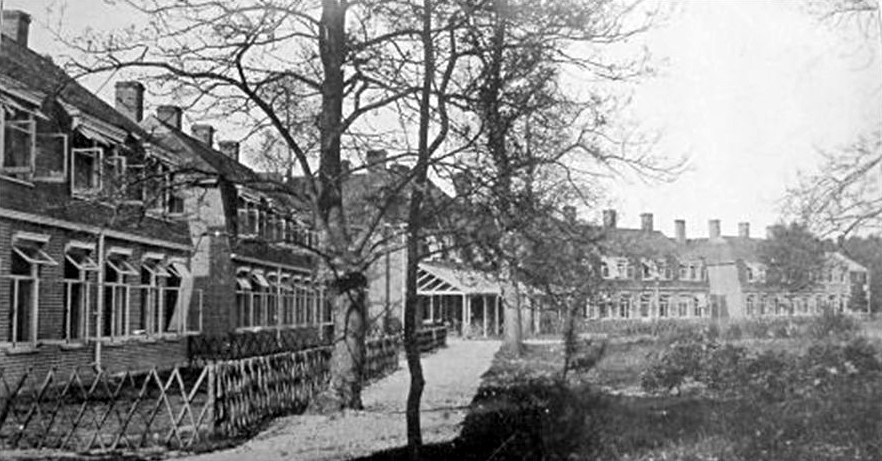
- London Open Air Sanatorium, c.1907

- Shown in Berkshire

Geography
- Location: Pinewood, England
- Coordinates: 51.3854°N 0.7958°W

Organisation
- Type: Specialist

Services
- Speciality: Tuberculosis

History
- Founded: 1901
- Closed: 1966

Links
- Lists: Hospitals in England

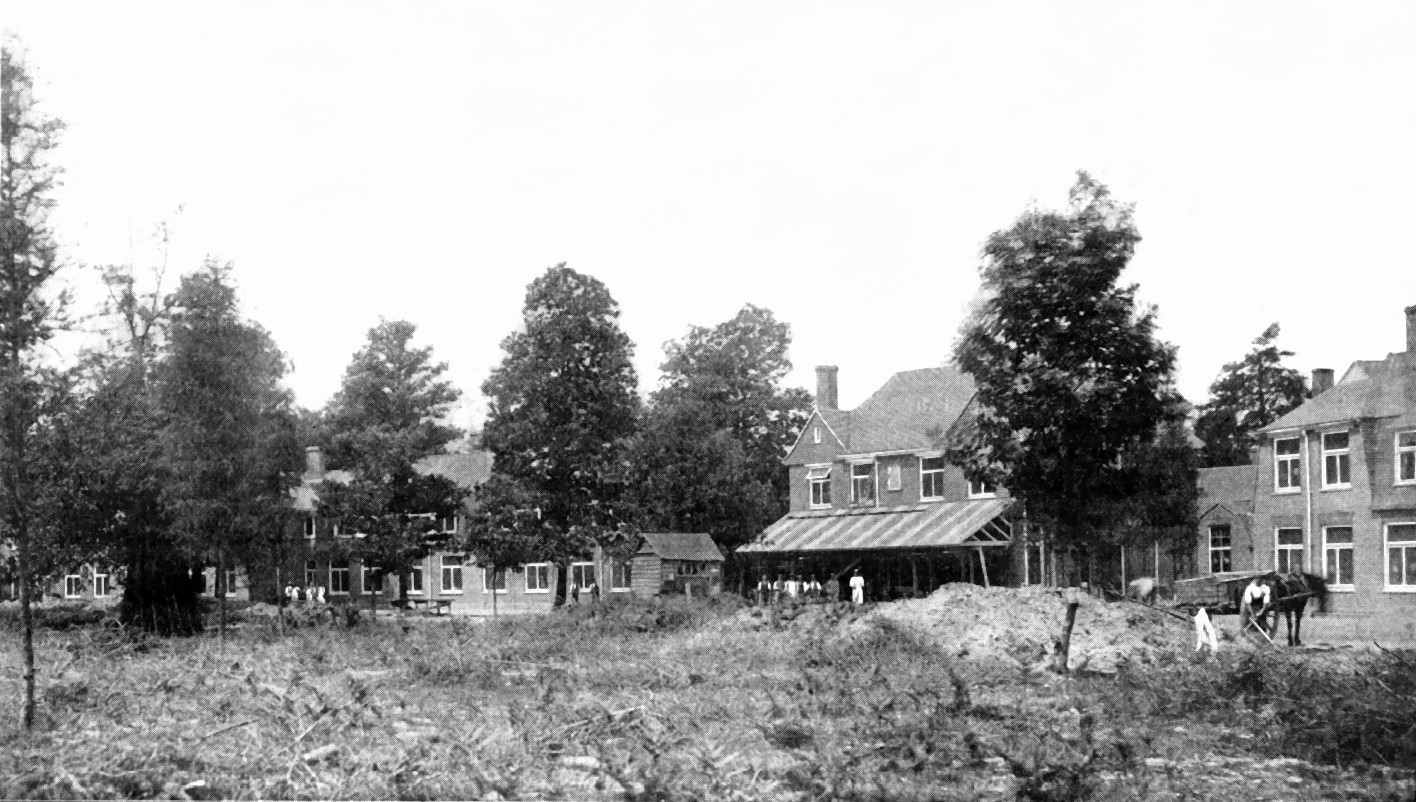
The sanatorium while under construction, c. 1901

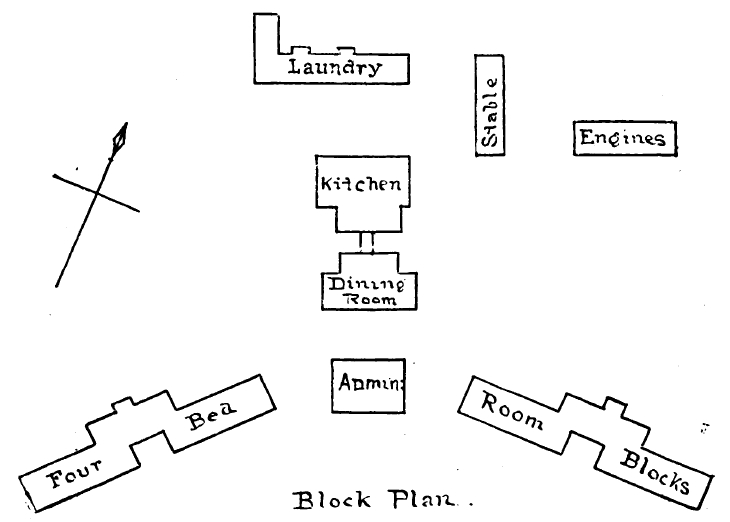
Plan of the sanatorium

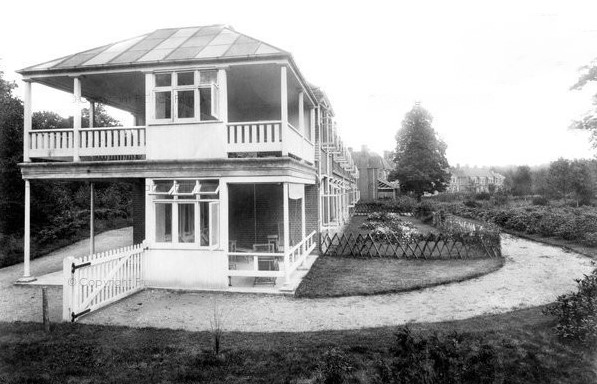
London Open Air Sanatorium, west wing, 1910

The Pinewood Hospital was a hospital in Pinewood, near Crowthorne, England, for the treatment of people suffering from tuberculosis. It was located in a pine wood as pine trees were thought to be beneficial in the treatment of the disease. It opened as the London Open Air Sanatorium in 1901 before becoming the Pinewood Sanatorium. It treated casualties of the First and Second World Wars and after the second, began to treat general thoracic patients as tuberculosis became less prevalent. It closed in 1966.

== History ==
The London Open Air Sanatorium was opened by the National Association for the Prevention of Tuberculosis in 1901 for the treatment of tuberculosis patients. They had purchased the 82-acre site in 1898, following a meeting convened at Marlborough House by the Prince of Wales (later King Edward VII). It was sited in a pine forest at Pine Wood (later Pinewood) in Berkshire as pine trees were thought to be beneficial for tuberculosis patients, and initially accommodated 64 male patients.

During the First World War the sanatorium was used to treat victims of gas warfare.

The Public Health (Prevention and Treatment of Disease) Act 1913, authorised the Metropolitan Asylums Board to treat those with tuberculosis. They acquired the organisation in 1919 and renamed it Pinewood Sanatorium. It opened on 7 July 1919.

The Metropolitan Asylums Board was taken over by the London County Council in 1929 and the sanatorium became a Special Hospital under the council's public health department. During the Second World War, it took some civilians, but was used predominantly for servicemen and by the Canadian Red Cross and Air Force who enlarged it by building wooden huts.

Nurses' badge

After the war, it became a cottage hospital. In 1952, a student rehabilitation unit was opened at the hospital. Up to 18 male students with tuberculosis from around the British Isles were offered convalescence in a "detached and self-contained ward". Entry criteria included being full-time, male and non-infectious, that is, sputum culture negative. The student patients were visited by their tutors so that their studies were not interrupted. In the main building, the first floor was used as the women's ward while the ground floor was used for surgical cases and the men accommodated in wooden huts.

In 1954, Norah Schuster set up the first pathology department at the hospital, in a wooden hut adapted for the purpose, as tuberculosis became less prevalent and the hospital began to see more patients with general thoracic disease. For instance, over three years the hospital saw about 20 cases of aspergillosis. In 1960, the hospital had 230 beds including a specialist unit for bronchitis patients and the student unit.

== Buildings ==
The main buildings were laid out to form a south-facing arc with a medical residence in the middle and two-storey wings with 16 rooms per floor, each with large windows to provide patients with light and fresh air. At the back was a corridor allowing access to toilets and a kitchen, and a dining-hall which was also used for recreation. The kitchens and female staff accommodation was to the north with the disinfecting rooms, laundry, and boiler-house. To the east was an isolation block reserved for cases of acute exanthemata. Patients were charged three guineas per week and typically stayed for at least six months.

== Clinical staff ==
Pathologist Norah Schuster worked at Pinewood Hospital from 1954 until her retirement in 1959.

Lauriston Elgie Shaw, an anatomy demonstrator who played an active part in the origins of the National Insurance Act 1911, became manager of the Metropolitan Asylums Board in 1916 and was chair of Pinewood Sanatorium sub-committee.

== Closure ==
The last patient left in January 1966. A proposal that the hospital should be turned into a detention centre did not go ahead. The building known as Canada House was sold to Hewlett Packard and other buildings and land to the local authority. In 2011, efforts were underway to turn the remains of the hospital into a museum.

== Maps ==
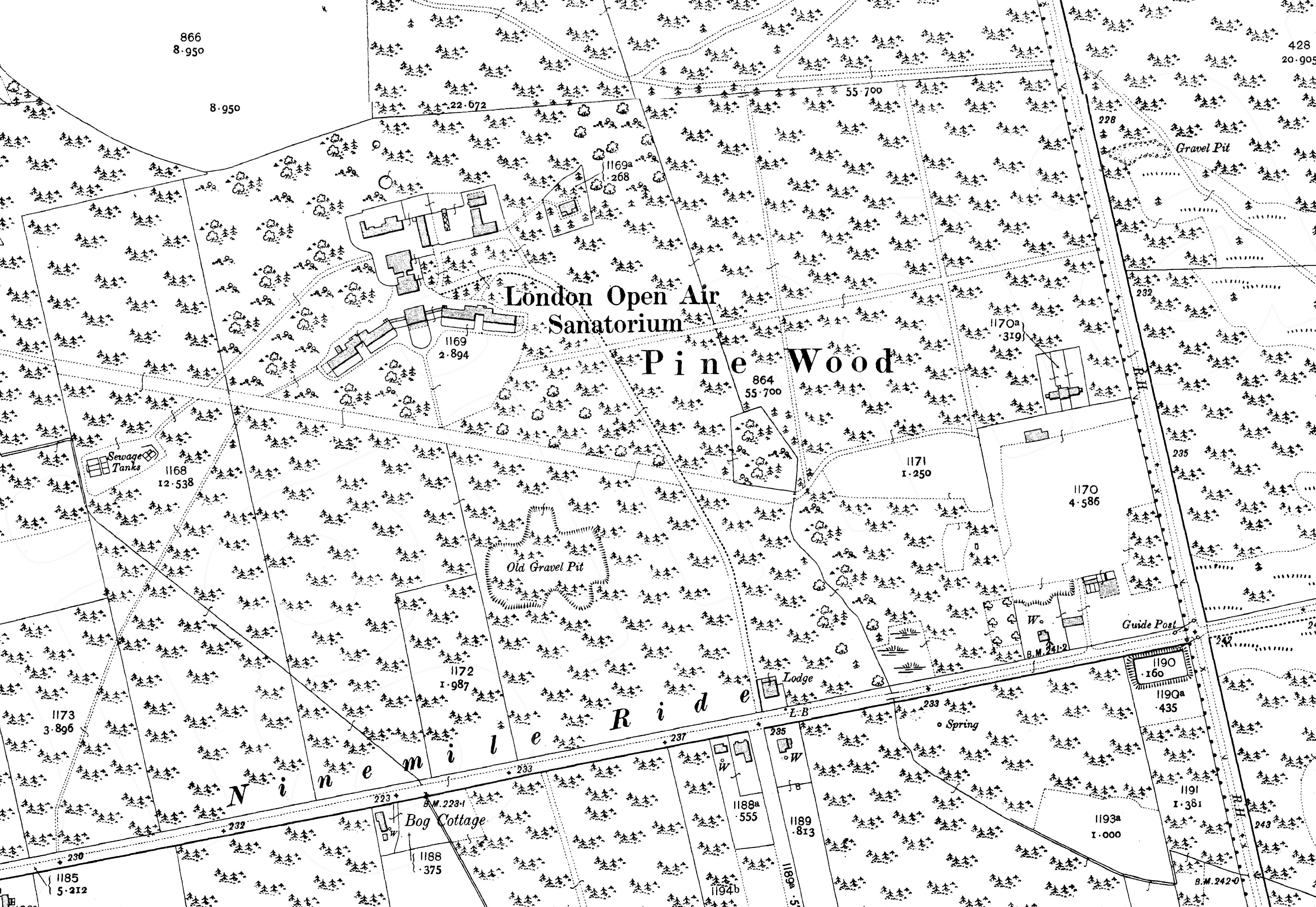
The London Open Air Sanatorium on an Ordnance Survey map of 1911

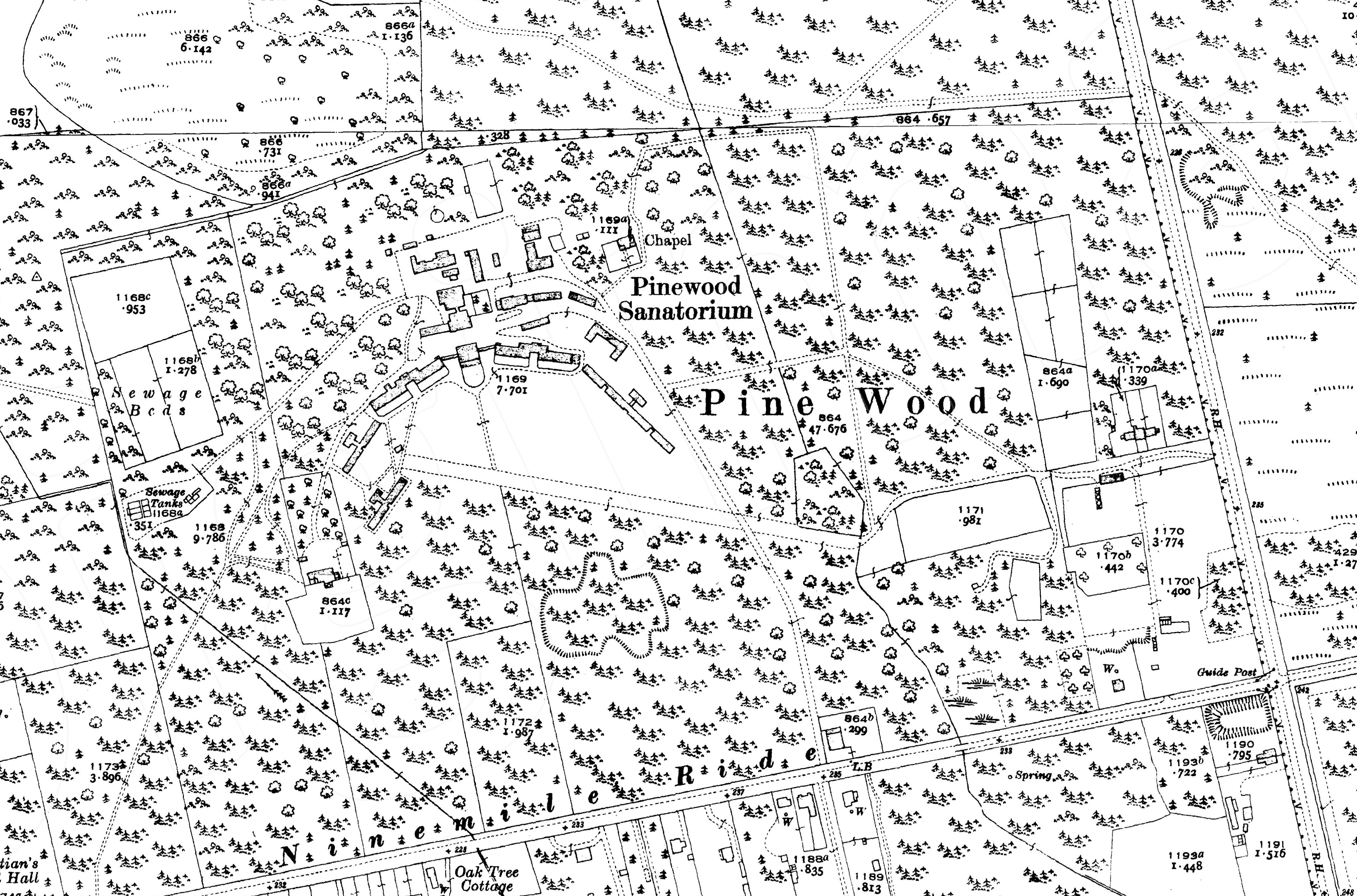
Pinewood Sanatorium, Ordnance Survey, 1933

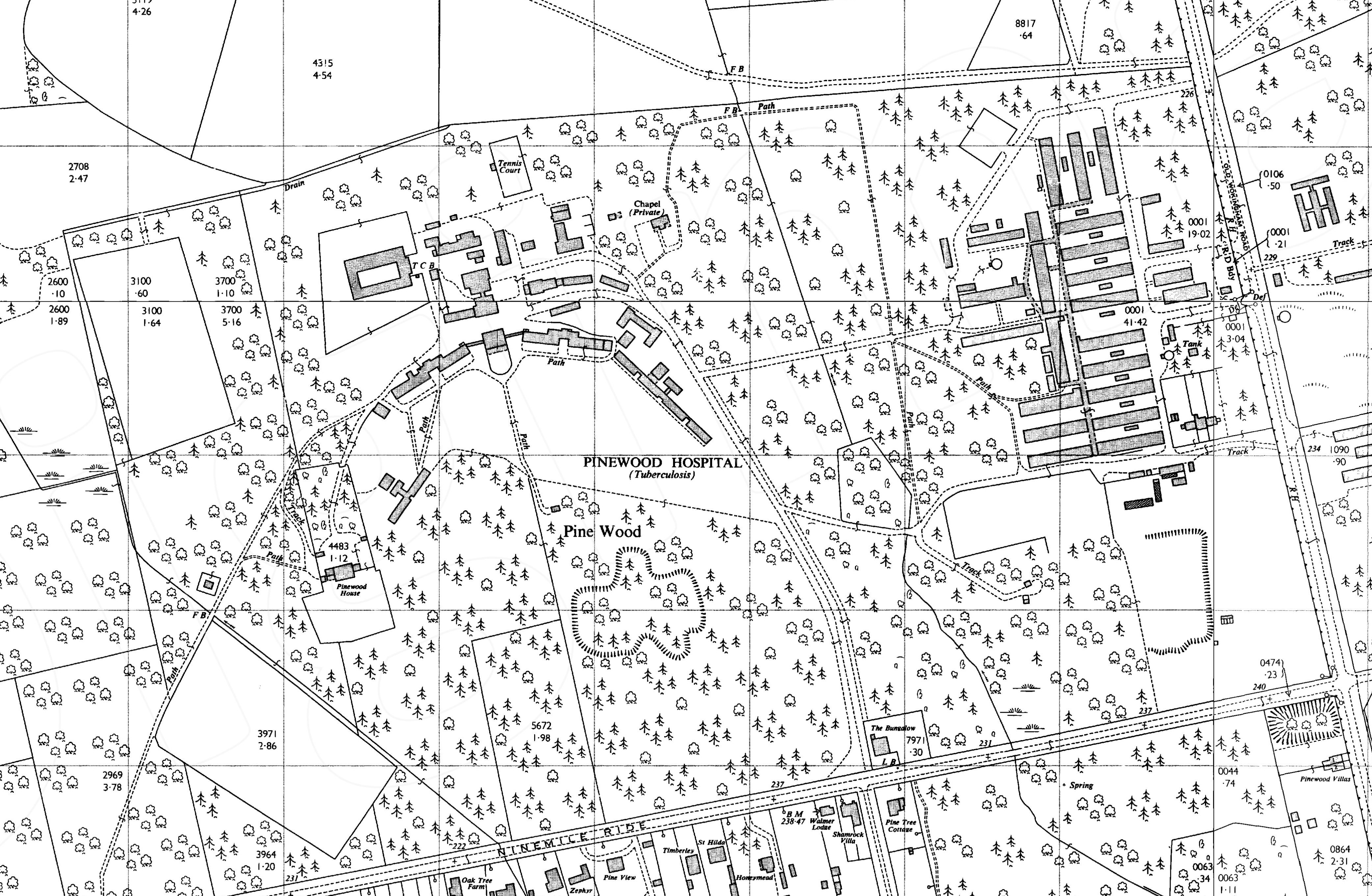
Pinewood Hospital, Ordnance Survey, 1965
