= OyaGen =

OyaGen, Inc.
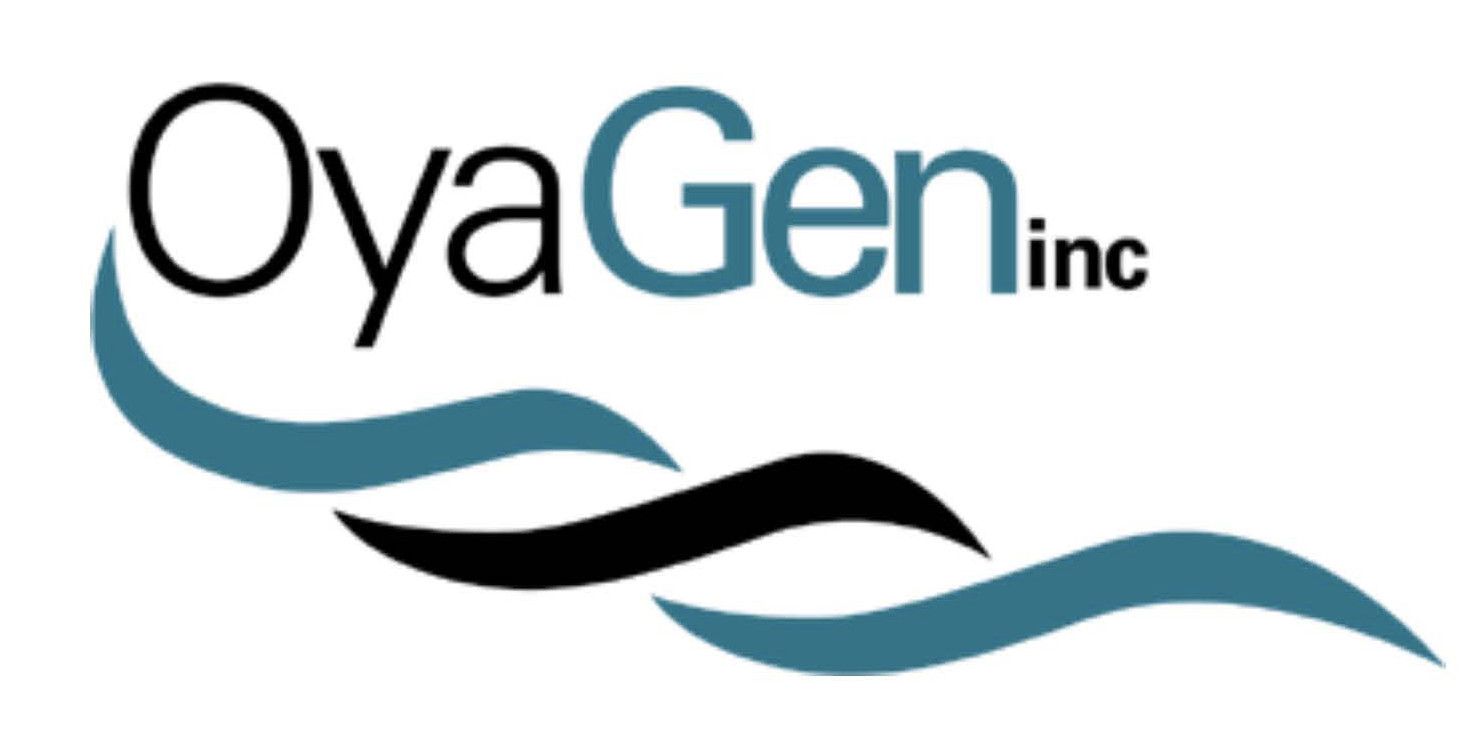
- Therapeutics Targeting Editing Enzymes
- Company type: Private
- Industry: Biotechnology; Pharmaceutical research
- Founded: Rochester, New York 2003
- Founder: Harold Smith
- Headquarters: Rochester, New York, US
- Area served: Global
- Key people: Harold Smith, CEO and President; Thomas Fitzgerald, COO; Ryan Bennett, CSO
- Products: Antiviral therapeutic lead compounds
- Services: Assay development; Lead compound optimization
- Number of employees: 6
- Website: oyageninc.com

OyaGen is a Rochester, New York-based startup company that is focused on developing treatments for HIV. The company was founded in 2003 by Harold Smith, a professor of biochemistry and biophysics at the University of Rochester. OyaGen was founded on research conducted by Smith and Hui Zang, an HIV researcher at Thomas Jefferson University.

== Research ==
OyaGen's research has focused on developing drug-based treatments for HIV and the company has three lead HIV drugs based upon editing enzymes in preclinical development. The company is exploring ways to prevent HIV from disabling the production of APOBEC3G (A3G), a naturally occurring editing enzyme that stops HIV from replicating. A3G combats HIV infection by interacting with and mutating the virus' RNA. The mutations genetically damage the virus protein and render HIV unable to replicate which halts the spread of the virus. In laboratory testing, OyaGen was able to use drug therapy to shield A3G from HIV, which allowed A3G to function normally and halt the spread of the virus.

The company is also researching drugs that protect A3G from viral infectivity factor (ViF). ViF is a protein created by HIV that "tricks" the body into destroying A3G by binding to it. Interfering with ViF's ability to bind to A3G can effectively block HIV replication. OyaGen is researching several compounds that prevent ViF from disabling A3G, including A3G agonists, ViF destabilizers and ViF dimerization antagonists.

== Funding ==
The company received seed funding from Trillium Group's University Technology Fund and the University of Rochester Medical Center. It has also received funding from the New York State Retirement Common Fund's Private Equity Program. The New York State Retirement Common Fund has invested approximately $1.4 million in the company since 2006. OyaGen's research has also been underwritten in part by the National Institutes of Health, which awarded grants to the company in 2011, 2012, and 2013.

== See also ==
- RNA editing
- APOBEC3G
- Viral infectivity factor
