= Henry Smyth =

Henry Smyth may refer to:

- Henry Smyth (Master of Magdalene College) (died 1642)
- William Henry Smyth (1788–1865), British astronomer
- Henry Smyth (British Army officer, born 1816) (1816–1891), British general
- Henry Augustus Smyth (1825–1906), Governor of Malta
- Henry Smyth (Canadian politician) (1841–1929)
- Charles Henry Smyth Jr. (1866–1937), American geologist
- Henry DeWolf Smyth (1898–1986), American physicist

== See also ==
- Hank Smith (disambiguation)
- Harry Smyth (1910–1992), Canadian speed skater
- Harry Smythe (1904–1980), American baseball player
- Henry Smith (disambiguation)
