= Archbishop Smith =

Archbishop Smith may refer to:

- James Smith (archbishop of St Andrews and Edinburgh) (1841–1928)
- Peter Smith (bishop) (1943–2020), Archbishop of the Archdiocese of Southwark
- William Smith (bishop) (1819–1892), Archbishop of the Archdiocese of St. Andrews and Edinburgh

== See also ==
- Bishop Smith (disambiguation)
