= Cooksburg, Pennsylvania =

Unincorporated community in Pennsylvania, US

- Unincorporated community
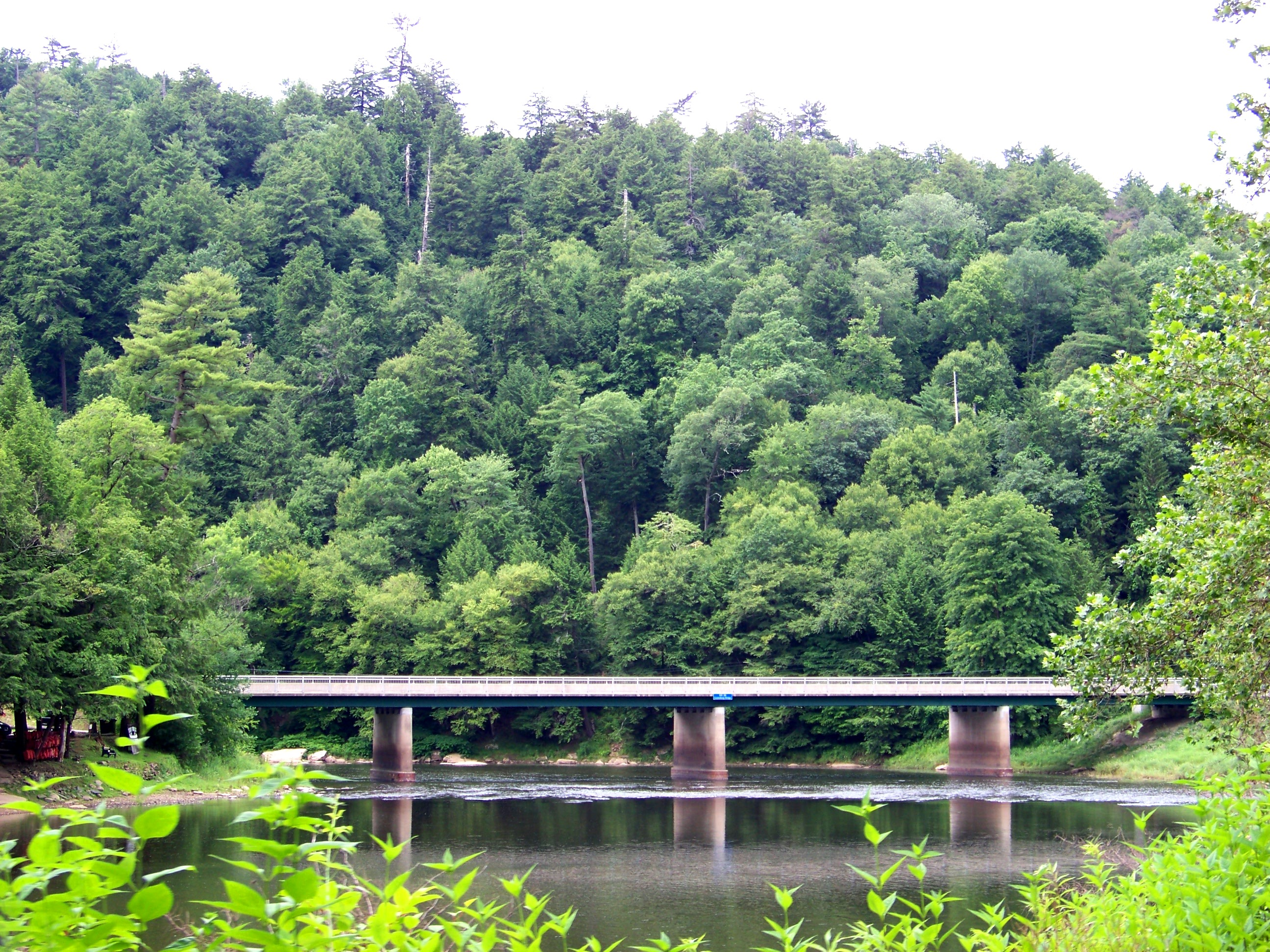
- PA Route 36 Bridge

- Location within Pennsylvania
- Coordinates: 41°20′00″N 79°12′34″W
- Country: United States
- State: Pennsylvania
- Counties: Clarion, Forest
- Townships: Farmington, Barnett
- Elevation: 1,197 ft (365 m)
- Time zone: UTC-5 (Eastern (EST))
  - Summer (DST): UTC-4 (EDT)
- ZIP code: 16217
- Area code: 814
- GNIS feature ID: 1172395

Cooksburg is an unincorporated community in Clarion and Forest counties, Pennsylvania, United States. The community is located on the north bank of the Clarion River at the Pennsylvania Route 36 bridge, 12.3 miles (19.8 km) northeast of Clarion. Cooksburg has a post office with ZIP code 16217.

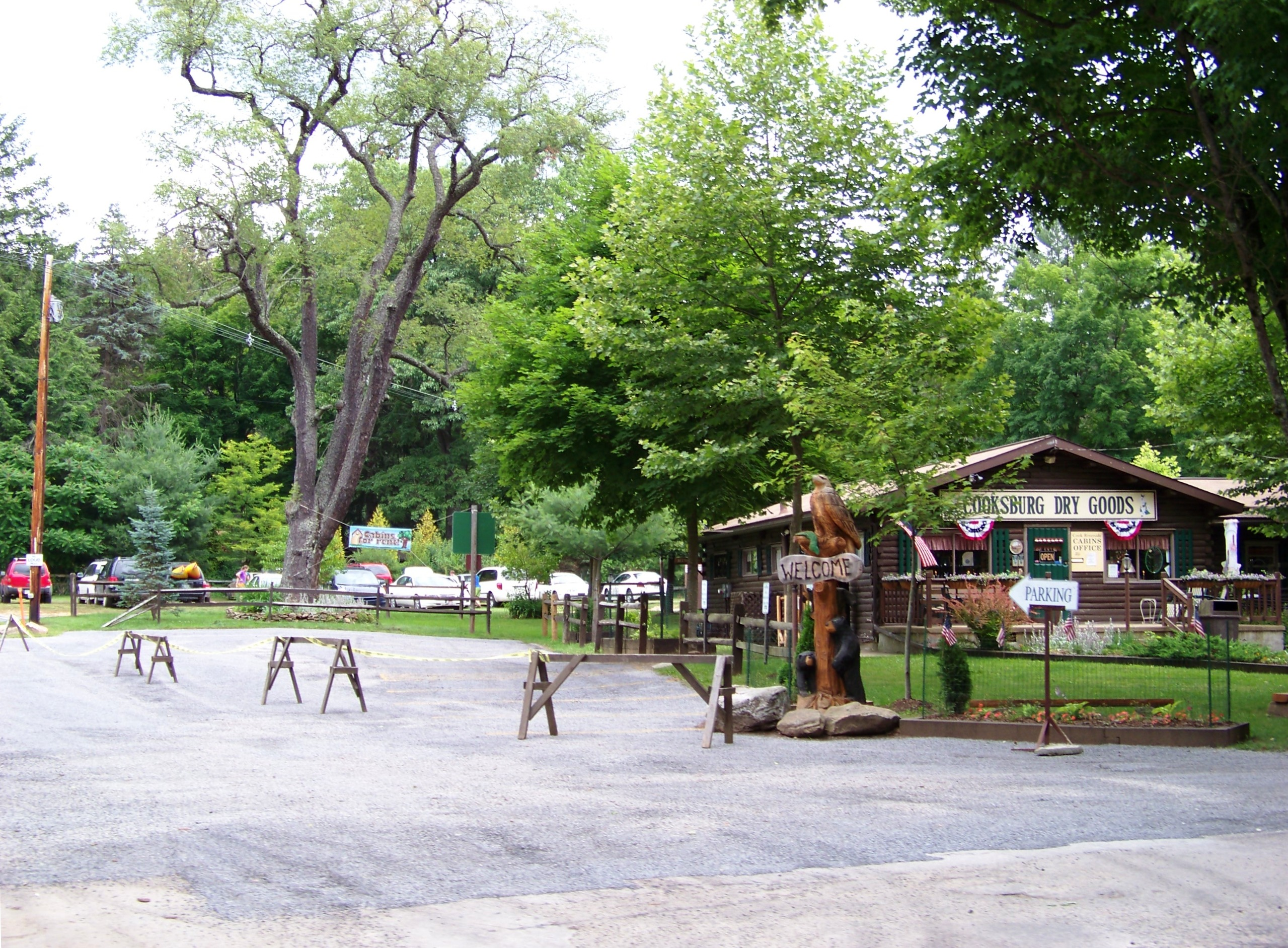
Rental cabins in Cooksburg

== Notable residents ==
- Lora Haines Cook, 12th President General of the Daughters of the American Revolution
