= Lauriston Elgie Shaw =

English physician

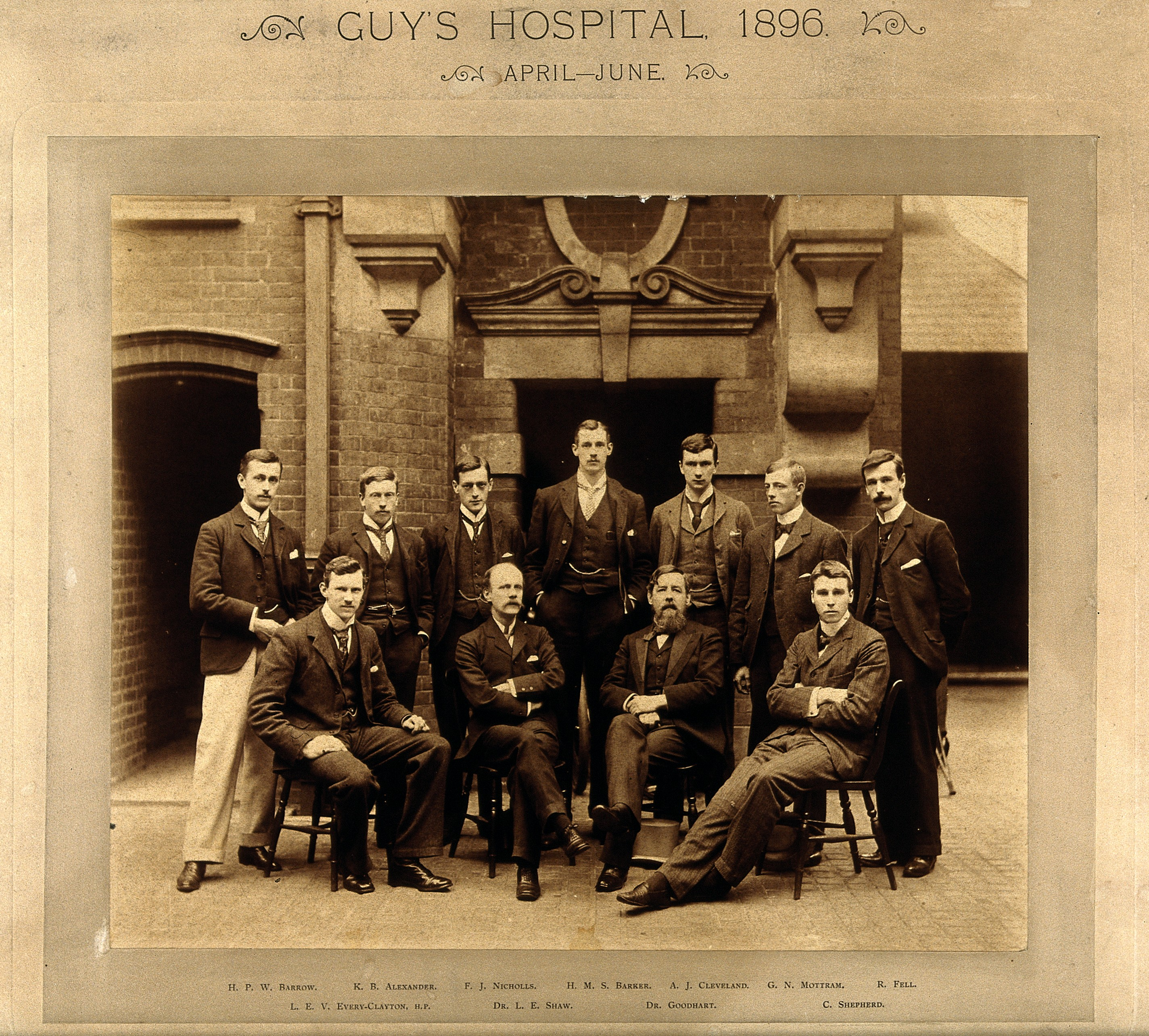
Guy's Hospital staff 1896. Lauriston Elgie Shaw, front row, second from left.

Lauriston Elgie Shaw FRCP (31 March 1859 – 25 December 1923) was an English physician and dean of the Guy's Hospital medical school from 1893 to 1901. He had an active part in framing the terms of the National Insurance Act 1911, which put him at odds with many of his colleagues who were strongly opposed to the legislation.

== Early life and family ==
Lauriston Elgie Shaw was born in London on 31 March 1859, the son of Archibald Shaw a medical practitioner of St. Leonards. He was educated at the City of London School and then University College, London. He studied medicine at Guy's Hospital and qualified in 1881.

Shaw married May, daughter of Howard Spalding. They had one son.

== Career ==
Shaw progressed through the normal appointments at Guy's during his early career, breaking only for a sea trip to Australia for his health during which he served as the ship's surgeon. Early on, he held the appointment of assistant physician to the City of London Hospital for Diseases of the Chest. In 1889, he was appointed assistant physician and demonstrator of morbid anatomy at Guy's. He was dean of the Guy's Hospital medical school from 1893 to 1901 and succeeded by his great friend John Fawcett. He was made full physician in 1907 and consulting physician in 1919.

He played an active part in the framing the terms of the National Insurance Act 1911 which put him at odds with many of his colleagues who were strongly opposed to it. His position created such antipathy to him that he felt that many avenues in the medical world were closed to him.

In 1915 or 1916, he became manager of the Metropolitan Asylums Board and was chair of Pinewood Santorium sub-committee.

== Death and legacy ==
Shaw died from the effects of pulmonary tuberculosis, a disease he had suffered from for 40 years, at Weybridge, Surrey, on 25 December 1923. He received an obituary in the British Medical Journal and is recorded in Munk's Roll.
