= Lora Haines Cook =

President General of the Daughters of the American Revolution (1866–1946)

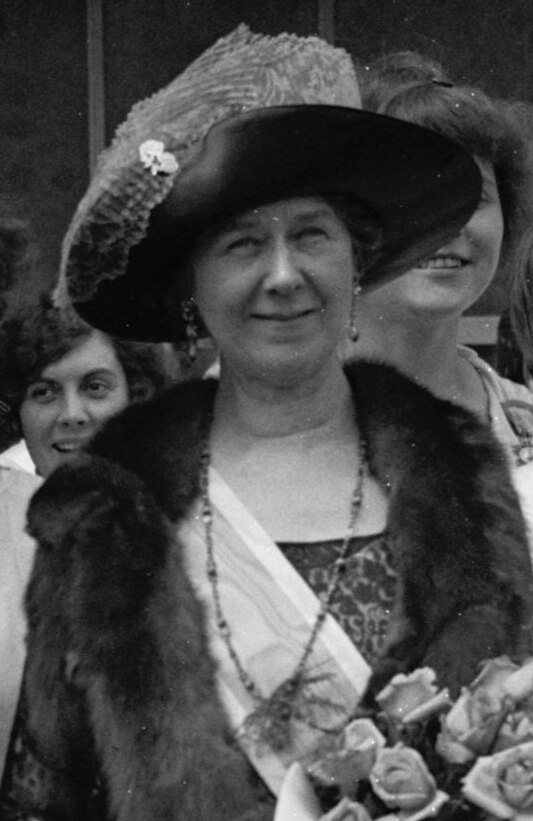
- Cook in 1925

Commissioner for the Washington Bicentennial
- President: Calvin Coolidge

12th President General of the National Society Daughters of the American Revolution
- In office 1923–1926
- Preceded by: Anne Rogers Minor
- Succeeded by: Grace Lincoln Hall Brosseau

Personal details
- Born: Lora Mary Haines; July 17, 1866 Lloydsville, Ohio, U.S.
- Died: February 10, 1946 (aged 79) Cooksburg, Pennsylvania, U.S.
- Resting place: Cooksburg Cemetery
- Spouse: Anthony Wayne Cook (m. 1892)
- Children: 1
- Education: Pittsburgh Female College; New England Conservatory of Music

Lora Mary Haines Cook (July 17, 1866 – February 10, 1946) was an American civic leader who served as the 12th president general of the National Society Daughters of the American Revolution.

== Early life and education ==
Cook was born Lora Mary Haines on July 17, 1866, in Lloydsville, Ohio, to Lewis Gregg Haines and Sarah Jones Hogan Haines. She was a direct descendent of Theophilus Eaton, Governor of the New Haven Colony.

She was educated at Pittsburgh Female College and the New England Conservatory of Music.

== Public service ==
Cook founded the Brookville Chapter of the Daughters of the American Revolution, which later merged into the Clarion Count Chapter, in 1899. She later served as Pennsylvania State Regent and vice president general.

She served as the president general of the Daughters of the American Revolution from 1923 to 1926. Following her time in office, she served as an honorary president general.

She was appointed by President Calvin Coolidge to serve as a member of the executive committee of the United States Commission for the celebration of the 200th anniversary of George Washington's birth. Cook also served on the Valley Forge Park Commission and on the board of directors of the Thomas Jefferson Foundation.

== Personal life ==
She married Anthony Wayne Cook on September 15, 1892, at the Methodist Episcopal Church in Cambridge, Ohio. They had one son, Anthony Wayne Cook, Jr.

She died on February 10, 1946, in Cooksburg, Pennsylvania.
