= Chained for Life (1952 film) =

1951 film by Harry L. Fraser

- Original film poster
- Directed by: Harry L. Fraser
- Written by: Ross Frisco (original idea); Nat Tanchuck (screenplay); Albert de Pina (additional dialogue)
- Produced by: George Moskov
- Starring: Violet Hilton; Daisy Hilton; Mario Laval; Allen Jenkins; Patricia Wright
- Cinematography: Jockey Arthur Feindel
- Edited by: Joseph Gluck
- Music by: Henry Vars
- Production company: Spera Productions
- Distributed by: Classic Pictures Inc.
- Release date: January 1952
- Running time: 81 min.
- Country: United States
- Language: English

Chained for Life is a 1952 exploitation film directed by Harry L. Fraser and featuring the famous conjoined twins Daisy and Violet Hilton.

== Plot ==
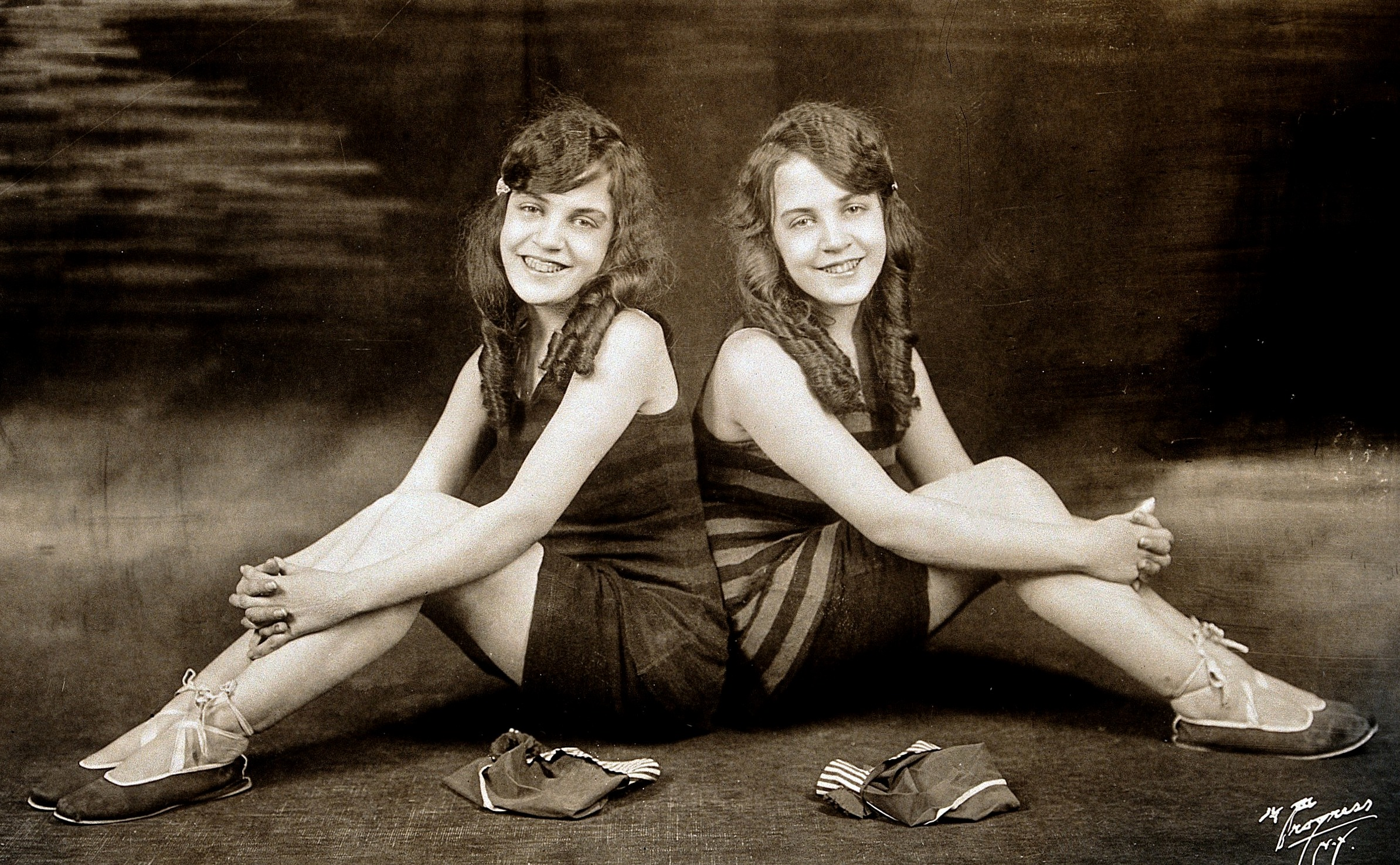
Daisy and Violet Hilton about 1927

Vivian Hamilton is on trial for the shooting death of her sister's lover. In flashback sequences, various characters are called to testify.

Siamese twins Dorothy and Vivian Hamilton have a successful vaudeville singing act, but their manager Hinkley thinks that a publicity stunt will reinvigorate their career. He pays stunt shooter Andre Pariseau to fake a romance with one of the twins. Vivian, the brunette, dislikes Andre and wants no part of the scheme, but Dorothy, the blonde, quips that she is too old to reject a chance at love and agrees to serve as Andre's love interest. The ploy works, with the girls singing for standing-room-only crowds.

Dorothy falls in love with the scheming Andre, although he is secretly involved with his shooting-act partner Renee. Andre proposes marriage, but the couple is unable to obtain a marriage license, as the marriage would constitute bigamy. Dorothy convinces Vivian to seek separation surgery, even at the risk of their lives, so that she can pursue her dreams of love. Doctors inform the women that the surgery is impossible but that there is no physical reason why Dorothy cannot marry.

By consulting with a blind minister, Dorothy and Andre are able to obtain their marriage license. The wedding ceremony is performed on the stage before an audience of dignitaries, including the mayor. But the next day, Andre leaves Dorothy, claiming that he could not adjust to life as the husband of a Siamese twin. Vivian knows differently, as she has seen Andre and Renee kissing passionately, and her suspicions of Andre are confirmed. Vivian is outraged that her sister has been mistreated. During Andre's shooting performance, Vivian seizes one of Andre's guns and shoots him dead before a horrified audience.

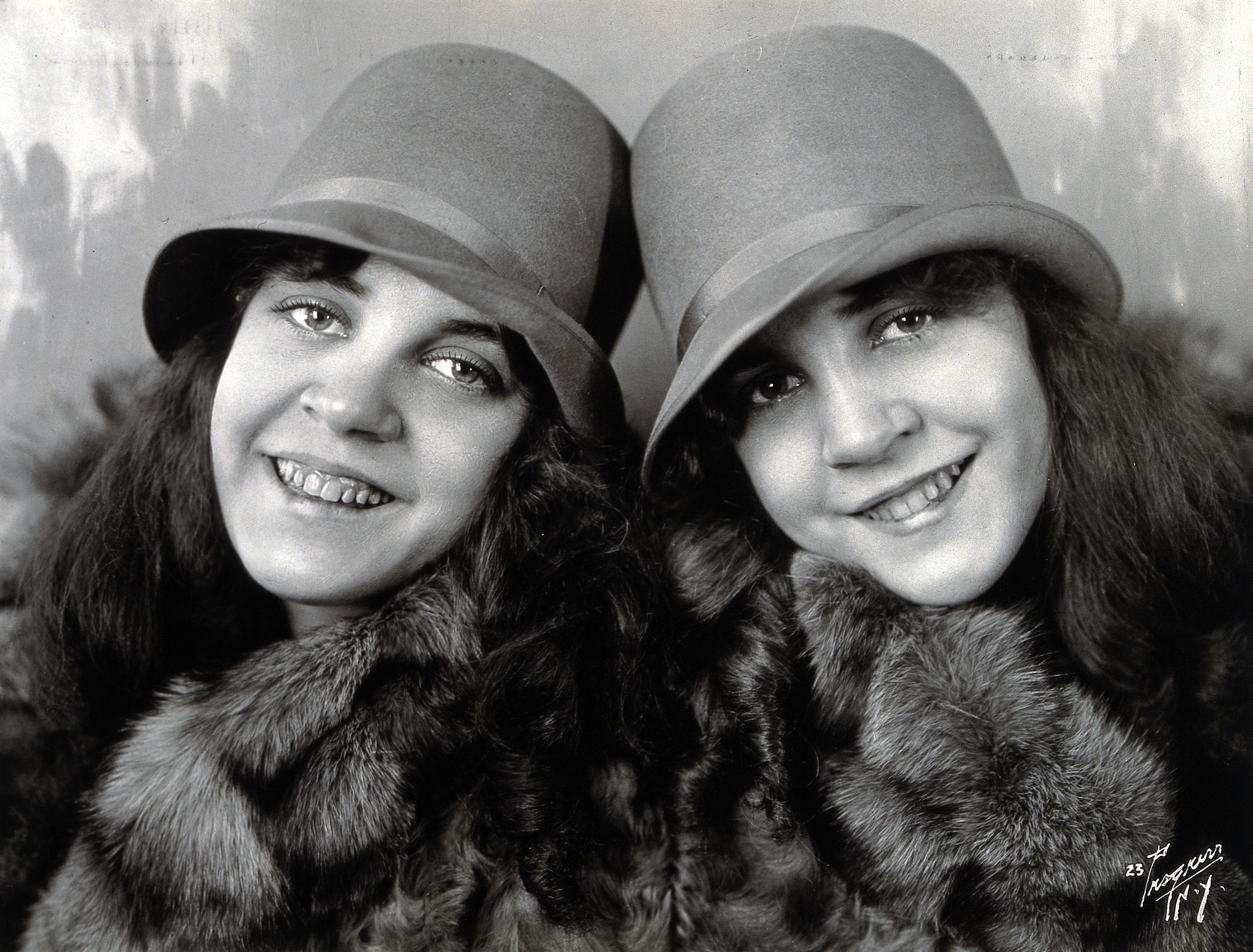
Daisy and Violet Hilton in 1927

In the courtroom, the judge struggles to assess guilt. Justice for Andre requires that his murderer, Vivian, is executed, but this would also kill the innocent Dorothy.

== Production ==
Chained for Life features several vaudeville acts, including juggler Whitey Roberts, a man performing bicycle stunts and Tony Lovello, who plays the William Tell Overture andHungarian Dance No. 5 at breakneck speed on an accordion.

The film incorporates aspects of the twins' real life, including their singing act, a futile attempt by one sister to obtain a marriage license and a publicity-stunt marriage.

The twins' voices are featured in three duets, including "Every Hour of Every Day" and "Love Thief".

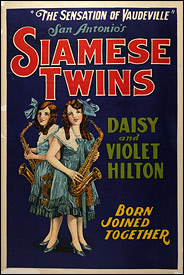
Scan of a poster circa 1920 of Daisy and Violet Hilton

== See also ==
- List of films in the public domain in the United States
- Lazarus and Joannes Baptista Colloredo: Siamese twins from the 17th century with a similar legal dilemma
- Freaks: 1932 film featuring the Hilton sisters
