= Henry Goodwin Smith =

Henry Goodwin Smith (January 8, 1860 in New York –1940) was a United States theologian, the son of Henry Boynton Smith.

He was pastor of the Freehold (New Jersey) Presbyterian Church in 1886-1896, and from 1897 to 1903 was professor of systematic theology in Lane Theological Seminary.

From notes of his lectures, William S Karr prepared two volumes of Dr. Smith's theological writings, Introduction to Christian Theology (1883) and System of Christian Theology (1884). Dr. Smith contributed articles on Calvin, Kant, pantheism, miracles, reformed churches, Schelling and Hegel to the American Cyclopaedia, and contributed to McClintock and Strong's Cyclopaedia; and was editor of the American Theological Review (1859 sqq.), both in its original form and after it became the American Presbyterian and Theological Review and, later, the Presbyterian Quarterly and Princeton Review.
