= Harold Smith (scientist) =

Harold C. Smith Jr.
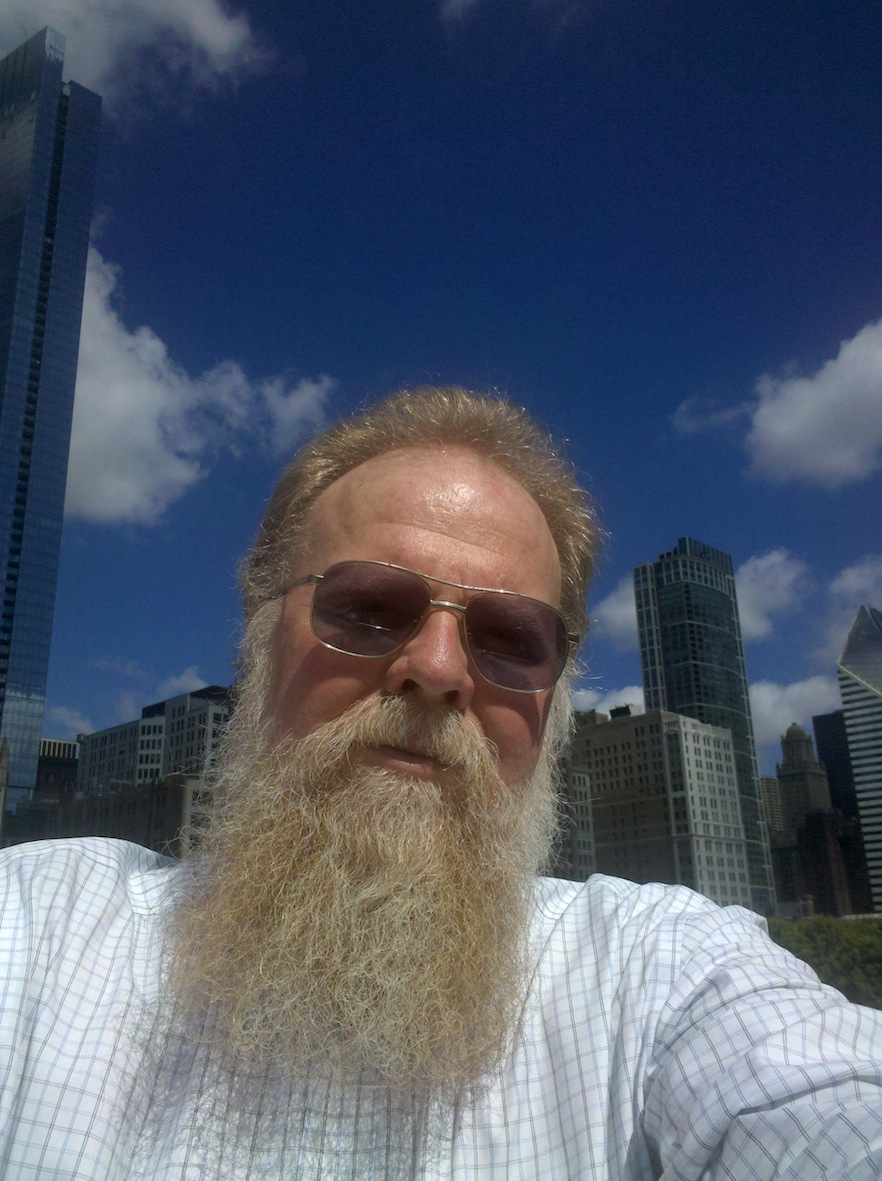
- Dr Smith in 2010
- Born: February 5, 1954; Münich, Germany
- Education: Purdue University, SUNY at Buffalo
- Known for: RNA editing
- Spouse: Jenny ML Smith
- Children: 3
- Scientific career
- Fields: Molecular Biology, Biochemistry, RNA Biology, Drug discovery, Higher Education
- Workplaces: OyaGen, University of Rochester
- Website: Academic website www.haroldsmithlab.com Company Website www.oyageninc.com

Harold C. Smith Jr. (born February 5, 1954) is an American scientist, researcher, professor, founder and CEO of OyaGen. Smith has written over 100 publications on his research in RNA editing, AIDS, oncology, and immunodeficiency, among others.

== Early life ==
Harold Smith was born in Germany to an Austrian mother and American father who was stationed in Austria with the military at the end of World War II. In 6th grade, Smith and his family moved from Frankfurt, Germany, to Massachusetts, where he completed his high school education.

== Education ==
Smith received his Bachelor of Arts in Biology in 1975 and his Master of Science in Veterinary Pharmacology and Physiology in 1978 at Purdue University. He then went to the State University at Buffalo where he obtained his Masters of Arts in Molecular Biology in 1980 and his PhD in Molecular Biology in 1982. He carried out postdoctoral studies at SUNY Buffalo and Baylor College of Medicine in Houston, Texas.

== Career ==
After completing his postdoctoral position with Dr. Susan Berget at Baylor College of Medicine in Biochemistry in 1986, Smith became an assistant professor at the University of Rochester. Between 1991 and 1994, Smith discovered the molecular mechanism by which proteins recognize messenger RNA and participate in site-specific assembly of enzyme complexes to orchestrate the modification of select cytidines to uridines in a process known as C to U RNA Editing. This work has served as the foundation for numerous findings concerning RNA sequence modifying mechanisms and DNA mutating mechanisms that determine cell and protein diversification and was cited for its groundbreaking ideas in an article written by L. Chan for Scientific American. In 1992, he was given an associate professorship with a limited tenure, which became fully tenured in 1996. In that time, he was also the director of graduate studies in the Department of Pathology. In 1994, Smith organized an Albany Research Conference which was the first international meeting focused on RNA editing and in 1997, Smith organized and chaired the first Gordon Conference for RNA Editing. From 1997 to 1998 he served as the director of Medical School Biochemistry in Cell Structure and Function, and subsequently as director of Molecules to Cells in the Double Helix Medical School Curriculum. In 2001, Smith became a full professor. He received more than $8 million in total funding over the following 12 years from the National Institutes of Health (NIH) and other agencies.

Harold Smith founded OyaGen, Inc., in 2003. OyaGen is a biopharmaceutical company which develops therapies to fight viral illness through editing enzymes, with a focus on Human Immunodeficiency Virus (HIV). Founded with a seed fund by the University of Rochester and the Trillium Group, Smith has successfully brought in $6.5 million in Angel investment and $2.1 million in total federal grant support for OyaGen. In 2005, the company began preclinical trials on a drug that OyaGen believes will protect the body's natural A3G, which functions as an editing enzyme in mutating HIV DNA during its replication in such a way that the virus can no longer code for itself. In 2008, he edited a book for Wiley and Sons on RNA and DNA Editing that brought together the next generation of scientists working in the field to comment on their work and the future of the field. That same year, Smith, through the University of Rochester Medical Center, received a $100 thousand grant from the Bill & Melinda Gates Foundation to aid in research for curing infectious diseases, such as HIV. The New York State Common Retirement Fund invested in OyaGen in 2006 and again in 2010. In February 2013, Cannabis Science, Inc. added Smith to its scientific advisory board. He was added to IGXBio's Scientific Advisory Board in 2014, as well as the Education Board at the American Health Council in August 2016. He continues as a professor at the University of Rochester, School of Medicine and Dentistry, teaching biochemistry and biophysics. Throughout his academic career, Smith has provided his expertise in reviewing grant proposals for the NIH as well as European and Israeli funding agencies.

== Selected publications ==
- Smith, Harold C. "RNA Editing" Encyclopedia of Life Sciences. : Macmillan Reference Ltd, Stockton Press, 2000.
- Smith, H.C. Sowden, M.P. Xie, K. & Wedekend, J.E. "Structure and Function of Mammalian Cytidine Deaminases that Mediate Expressed Sequence Diversification." Topics in Current Genetics. Grosjean, H.: Springer-Verlag, 2005. 1610-2096
- Smith, Harold, C. "Editing Informational Content of Expressed DNA Sequences and Their Transcripts." The Implicit Genome. Caporale, L.: Oxford University Press, 2006. 248-265
- J. Cruz-Reyes, J.D. Alfonzo, T. Meier, S. Maxwell, C. McElrevey, J.E. Wedekind, G.L. Verdine, B. Brown, E. Esinberg, S. Mass, S. Lin, Y.-T. Yu, V. Blanc, N.O Davidson, M. Ohman, R. Harris, A.M. Sheehy, G. Carmichael. RNA and DNA Editing: Mechanisms and Their Impact on Biological Systems. : Wiley & Sons, 2008.
- Smith, HC. "The APOBEC1 Paradigm for Mammilian Cytidine Deaminases that Edit DNA and RNA." DNA and RNA Modifications Enzymes: Structure, Mechanism, Function and Evolution. Chapter 15. 2009 May; Landes Bioscience.
- Smith, Harold C. "Deaminase-dependent and Deaminase-independent Functions of APOBEC1 and APOBEC1 Complementation Factor in the Context of the APOBEC Family." RNA Editing: Current Research and Future Trends. Chapter 7. Oct 2013; Caister Academic Press.
- Jason D. Salter, Guillermo A. Morales, Harold C. Smith. "Structural insights for HIV-1 therapeutic strategies targeting Vif." Trends in Biochemical Sciences. August 11, 2014. 1–8.

== Personal life ==
Smith met his wife, Jenny, during his sophomore year at Purdue. They have three children, Owen, Hanna and Sam.
