= Henry Smith (footballer, born 1882) =

Australian rules footballer

Personal information
- Full name: Henry Smith
- Born: 25 August 1882
- Died: 25 February 1957 (aged 74)
- Original team: Brunswick

Playing career^{1}
Years	Club	Games (Goals)
1906	Melbourne	1 (0)
- ^{1} Playing statistics correct to the end of 1906.

Henry Smith (25 August 1882 – 25 February 1957) was an Australian rules footballer who played with Melbourne in the Victorian Football League (VFL).
