= Harry Smith (footballer, born 1901) =

English footballer

Personal information
- Full name: Henry Smith
- Date of birth: 14 October 1901
- Place of birth: Walthamstow, England
- Position: Winger

Senior career*
| Years | Team | Apps | (Gls) |
| 1919–1925 | Clapton Orient | 167 | (9) |
| 1932 | Royal London United Sports | | |
| Total | | 167 | (9) |
- * Club domestic league appearances and goals

Henry Smith (born 14 October 1901) was an English footballer who played in the Football League for Clapton Orient.
