= Harold Smith (detective) =

Harold Smith (1926 – February 19, 2005) was an American investigator and detective, specializing in fine-art and jewelry theft.

== Career ==
Smith represented Lloyd's of London and many other insurance companies for over 50 years. He also was a security consultant for leading jewelers, museums and art galleries in the United States and overseas, including Sotheby's, Christie's, the Smithsonian, and the Getty Museum.

Among his cases were the largest gold robbery in the history of the United States and the master theft of 13 paintings from the Isabella Stewart Gardner Museum in 1990, which included a remarkable Vermeer, "The Concert."

Smith, who had an unusual appearance in latter years – an eyepatch and rubber nose as a result of skin cancer – was featured in the 2005 documentary film Stolen. The film was dedicated to Smith's memory. Ulrich Boser's 2009 book, The Gardner Heist, gives an in-depth recounting of the many leads Smith followed in his investigation of the stolen paintings. In passing, it also provides biographical details about Harold Smith himself.

Born in the South Bronx, Smith attended local Catholic schools and then the Merchant Marine Academy in New York. After the Second World War he became an insurance adjuster for Lloyd's. It was while working in merchant shipping that Smith contracted a dry-skin condition and allowed himself to be subjected to experimental treatments. Smith was covered with oil and exposed to full-body ultraviolet light, which developed into skin cancer throughout his body. Eventually he lost a lung, his right eye and finally his nose, along with all sense of smell.

He was the father of eight children.
