= Henry Boynton Smith =

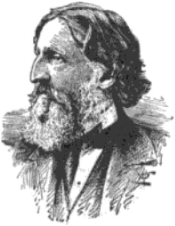
- Born: November 21, 1815; Portland, Maine, U.S.
- Died: February 7, 1877 (aged 61); New York City, U.S.
- Education: Bowdoin College
- Occupation: Theologian

Henry Boynton Smith (November 21, 1815 - February 7, 1877) was an American theologian, who was born in Portland, Maine. He is best known for introducing many Americans to avant-garde German historical scholarship, especially in his History of the Church of Christ, in Chronological Tables: A Synchronistic View of the Events, Characteristics, and Culture of Each Period, including the History of Polity, Worship, Literature, and Doctrines: Together with Two Supplementary Tables upon the Church in America; And an Appendix Containing the Series of Councils, Popes, Patriarchs, and Other Bishops, and a Full Index (1860).

He graduated at Bowdoin College in 1834; studied theology at Andover, where his health failed, at Bangor, and, after a year (1836-1837) as librarian and tutor in Greek at Bowdoin, in Germany at Halle, where he became personally intimate with August Tholuck and Hermann Ulrici, and in Berlin, under August Neander and Ernst Wilhelm Hengstenberg.

He returned to America in 1840, was a tutor for a few months (1840-1841) at Bowdoin, and in 1842, shut out from any better place by distrust of his German training and by his frank opposition to Unitarianism, he became pastor of the Congregational Church of West Amesbury (now Merrimac), Massachusetts. In 1847-1850 he was professor of moral philosophy and metaphysics at Amherst; and in 1850-1854 was Washburn professor of Church history, and in 1854-1874 Roosevelt professor of systematic theology, at Union Theological Seminary, where he also served as the head librarian for the Burke Library. His health failed in 1874 and he died in New York City on February 7, 1877. His son Henry Goodwin Smith was also a theologian.

Rejecting the Old School version of New England Theology, Smith was one of the foremost leaders of the new school Presbyterians and promoted principles of the so-called "mediating theology" (Vermittlungstheologie). His theology is most strikingly contained in the Andover address, "Relations of Faith and Philosophy," which was delivered before the Porter Rhetorical Society in 1849. He always made it clear that the ideal philosophy was Christocentric: he said that Reformed theology must "'Christologize' predestination and decrees, regeneration and sanctification, the doctrine of the Church, and the whole of the Eschatology."

For his theology, Smith used the Incarnation as "the structural principle of his theology." In this approach, he followed the mediating theologians.
