= Harry Smith (cricketer, born 1890) =

English cricketer

Harry William Smith (6 September 1890 – ?) was an English cricketer. He was a right-handed batsman and a right-arm medium-fast bowler who played first-class cricket for Essex. He was born in Mile End.

Smith made his debut for the Essex Second XI at the age of nineteen, and played just three first-class matches before the outbreak of the First World War, his debut coming against Kent in 1912. However, Smith's breakthrough in the team was not to come until 1921, a season in which Essex's form dropped considerably, in which Smith playing eight first-class matches during the season as a tailender.

Smith achieved one five-wicket innings in his career, one which saw him rooted to Essex's tailend until the end of the 1922 season, after which he quit the game.
