= Pinewood, Berkshire =

Coordinates: 51.387°N 0.796°W

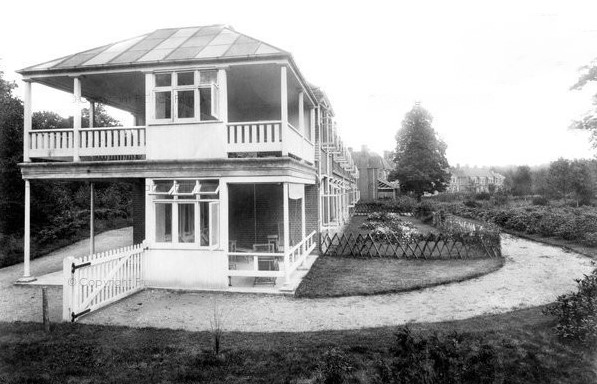
London Open Air Sanatorium, Pinewood, 1910.

Pinewood (formerly Pine Wood) is a rural area of Wokingham Without, near Crowthorne, in the English county of Berkshire, covered by the campus of the Johnson & Johnson Institute, the Pinewood Centre community club and society complex and a small industrial estate.

The Pinewood Centre is run by Wokingham Without Parish Council.

== History ==
Pinewood is known for its dense forest of pine trees. Following clearance of parts of the area in the twentieth century, a number of buildings were erected around the crossroads. The London Open Air Sanatorium for tuberculosis patients was opened in 1901 before becoming the Pinewood Sanatorium and then the Pinewood Hospital. Pine trees were thought to be beneficial for sufferers of the disease. It closed in 1966. In 2011, efforts were underway to turn the remains of the hospital into a museum.

== Maps ==
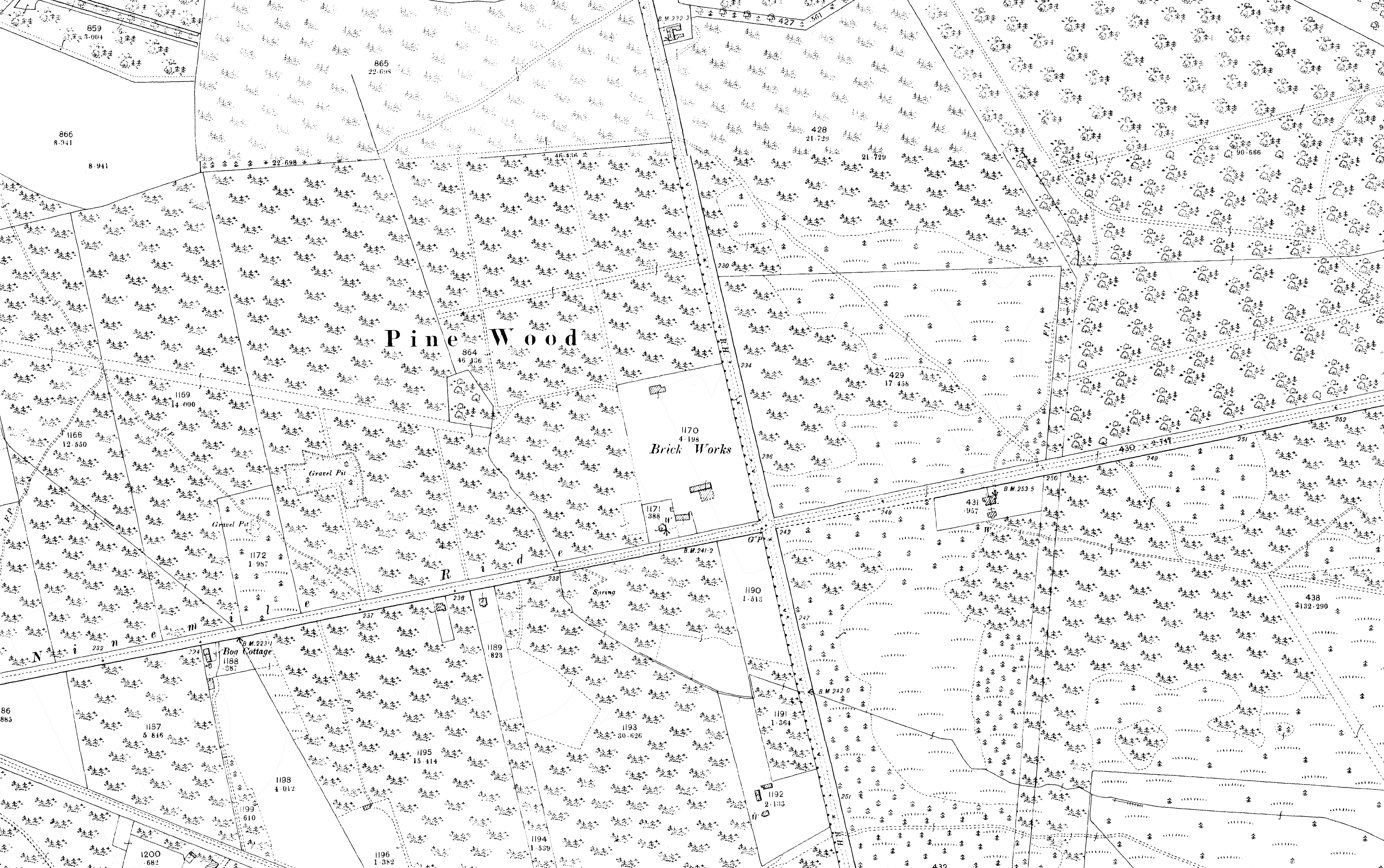
Pine Wood on an 1899 Ordnance Survey map.

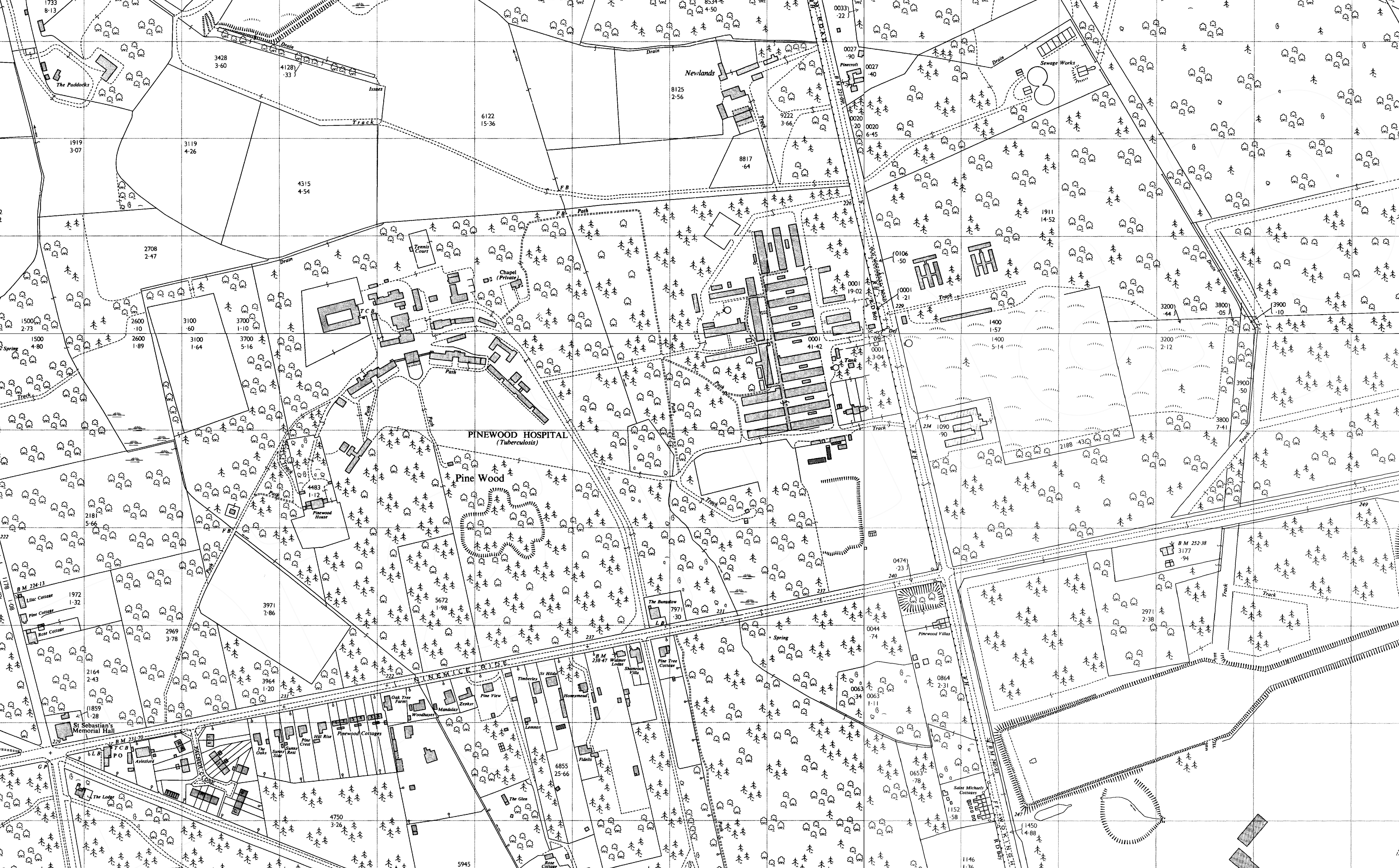
Pinewood on a 1965 Ordnance Survey map.
