= Harry Smith (coach) =

American football coach

Harry Smith served as the strength coach for the Tampa Bay Buccaneers of the National Football League (NFL) from 1976 to 1979.
