= Harold Palmer Smith Jr. =

American academic (1935–2025)

Harold Palmer Smith, Jr.
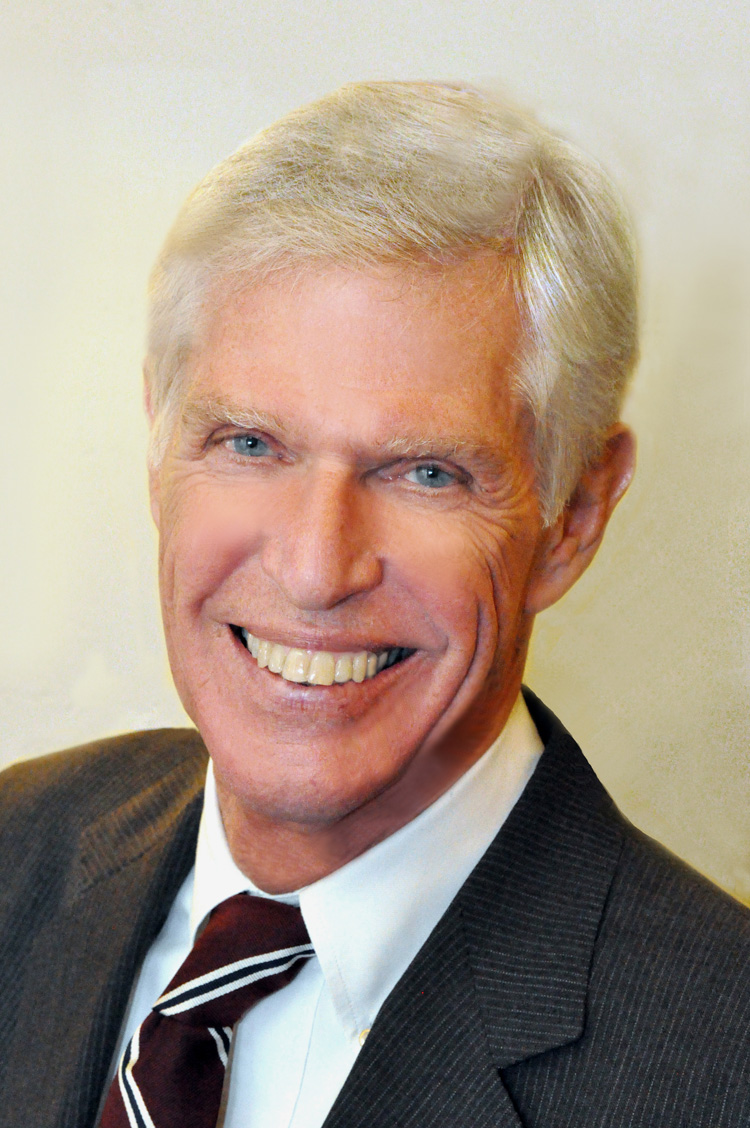
- Born: November 30, 1935; Greensburg, Pennsylvania, U.S.
- Died: August 1, 2025 (aged 89); Piedmont, California, U.S.
- Occupations: Professor, Consultant, DOD Official
- Spouse: Marian Bamford Smith (married c. 1958.)(Passed away January 26, 2022)
- Children: 3

Harold Palmer Smith Jr. (November 30, 1935 – August 1, 2025) was an American professor, consultant, and expert on defense policy. He was Assistant to the Secretary of Defense (Atomic Energy) from June 1993 to March 1996, when the name of the position changed to Assistant Secretary of Defense for Nuclear, Chemical & Biological Defense Programs.

== Career ==
Smith held the appointment of Distinguished Scholar in Residence with the Institute for Governmental Studies at the University of California at Berkeley (UCB) where he was responsible for the Harold Smith Seminar Series focusing on national and international defense policy and was a major participant in its successor series.

Born in Greensburg, Pennsylvania, Smith attended the Massachusetts Institute of Technology (MIT) as a Sloan National Scholar, earning a B.S. degree in mechanical engineering in 1957, an M.S. degree in nuclear engineering in 1958, and a Ph.D in 1960. . His doctoral thesis, Dynamics and control of nuclear rocket engines was conducted under the supervision of Alan H. Stenning.

In 1960, immediately after receiving the Ph.D. degree, he joined the faculty of UCB where he published extensively on the optimal control of nuclear systems and on the interaction of radiation with surfaces. He retired as professor and chairman of the Department of Applied Science in 1976 and formed the Palmer Smith Corporation, a consulting firm specializing in management of high technology programs. The firm was retained by many of the largest defense contractors. He was one of the early principals of SAIC and RDA-Logicon and JAYCOR.

Smith was awarded a White House Fellowship in 1966 and was assigned as a Special Assistant to the Secretary of Defense. Since that time, he served as an advisor on numerous governmental boards on national security policy, giving particular attention to projects requiring a broad range of technical and managerial skills. Of particular note was his chairmanship of the Vulnerability Task Force of the Defense Science Board and a special study for (then) Secretary of Defense James R. Schlesinger on the Airborne Warning and Control System (AWACS); a.k.a., the Smith Report.

In 1993, Smith accepted an appointment with the Clinton Administration as Assistant Secretary of Defense for Nuclear, Chemical, and Biological Defense Programs with responsibilities for reduction and maintenance of the American and NATO arsenals of nuclear weapons, dismantlement of the chemical weapon stockpile, oversight of the chemical and biological defense programs, management of counter-proliferation acquisition, and management of treaties related to strategic weapons. He was responsible for implementation of the Cooperative Threat Reduction (Nunn Lugar) program, which assisted the former Soviet Union in the dismantlement of their weapons of mass destruction and in converting their related industries to commercial production. The Defense Special Weapons Agency and the On-Site Inspection Agency reported to him. He returned to private life in 1998.

He was a Fellow of the American Physical Society, a Commander in the Legion of Honor of France, and three times received the Distinguished Public Service Award, as well as awards by the Military Services and Defense Agencies. He published articles involving national security in Arms Control Today.

An oral history of his career may be found in the Bancroft Library Oral History Center.

== Personal life and death ==
He married Marian Bamford Smith in 1958. They have three children: Natalya (1959), Peter (1960) and Erika (1963). Marian Smith died January 26, 2022, at the age of 86. Smith died on August 1, 2025, at the age of 89.
