= Daisy and Violet Hilton =

U.S. based British conjoined performing twins

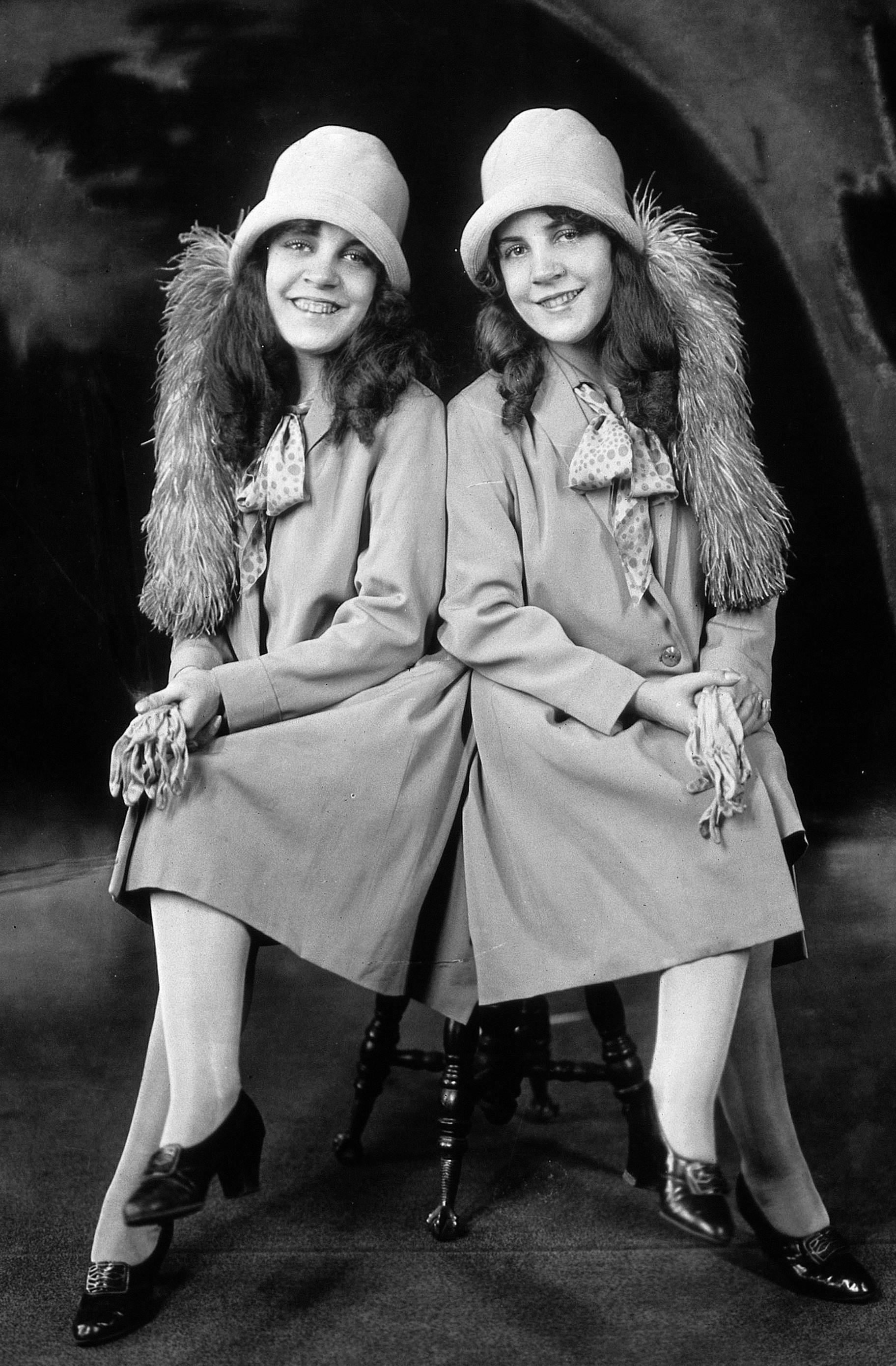
- Hilton twins c. 1927
- Born: 5 February 1908; Brighton, Sussex, England
- Died: 4 January 1969 (aged 60); Charlotte, North Carolina, U.S.
- Occupations: film actresses; vaudevillians; sideshow performers
- Known for: Freaks, Chained for Life
- Spouse(s): Daisy: Harold Estep (1941－1941, 10 days); Violet: James Moore (1936－1946)
- Mother: Kate Skinner

Daisy and Violet Hilton were English-born entertainers who were conjoined twins. They were exhibited in Europe as children, and toured the United States sideshow, vaudeville and American burlesque circuits in the 1920s and 1930s. They were best known for their film appearances in Freaks and the biographic Chained for Life (1951).

The twins were born at 18 Riley Road, Brighton, England. Their mother was Kate Skinner, an unmarried barmaid. The sisters were born joined by their hips and buttocks; they shared blood circulation and were fused at the pelvis but shared no major organs.

They were referred to in the media variously as The Siamese Twins, The Hilton Sisters and The Brighton Twins or The Brighton Conjoined Twins and in the United States as the San Antonio Twins. The sisters performed alongside Bob Hope and Charlie Chaplin. After years of being managed professionally by their legal guardians, in the early 1930s, on the advice of Harry Houdini, they were legally emancipated.

== Early life ==
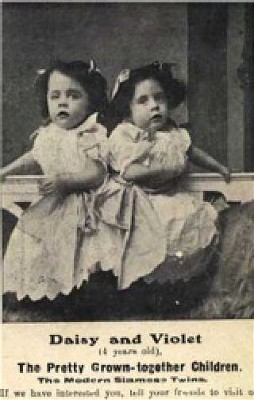
Daisy and Violet, aged four

Daisy and Violet Hilton were born on 5 February 1908 at 18 Riley Road in Brighton, Sussex, England, to Kate Skinner, an unmarried barmaid. They were joined at the hips and buttocks (pygopagus twins), sharing a pelvis and blood circulation but no major organs.

Their birth was attended by physician James Augustus Rooth, who later published a detailed medical description in the British Medical Journal. Rooth reported that the Sussex Medico-Chirurgical Society considered surgically separating the twins but unanimously rejected the operation because their shared circulation made it likely that one or both children would die. He also noted that Daisy and Violet were the first conjoined twins known to have been born in Britain and to survive beyond the first few weeks of life.

Shortly after their birth, Daisy and Violet were separated from their mother under circumstances that remain uncertain. Contemporary and later accounts variously state that Kate Skinner abandoned them, sold them, or was deceived into relinquishing custody. They were subsequently placed in the care of Mary Hilton, Skinner's employer.

During their early childhood, Daisy and Violet lived above the Queen's Arms public house in Brighton before moving to the Evening Star pub.

== Career ==
=== Early careers ===
The Hilton sisters toured first in Britain in 1911 (aged three) as "The Double Bosses".They went through Germany, then to Australia, then in 1916 to the US. In 1926, Bob Hope formed an act called the Dancemedians with the sisters, who had a tap-dancing routine.

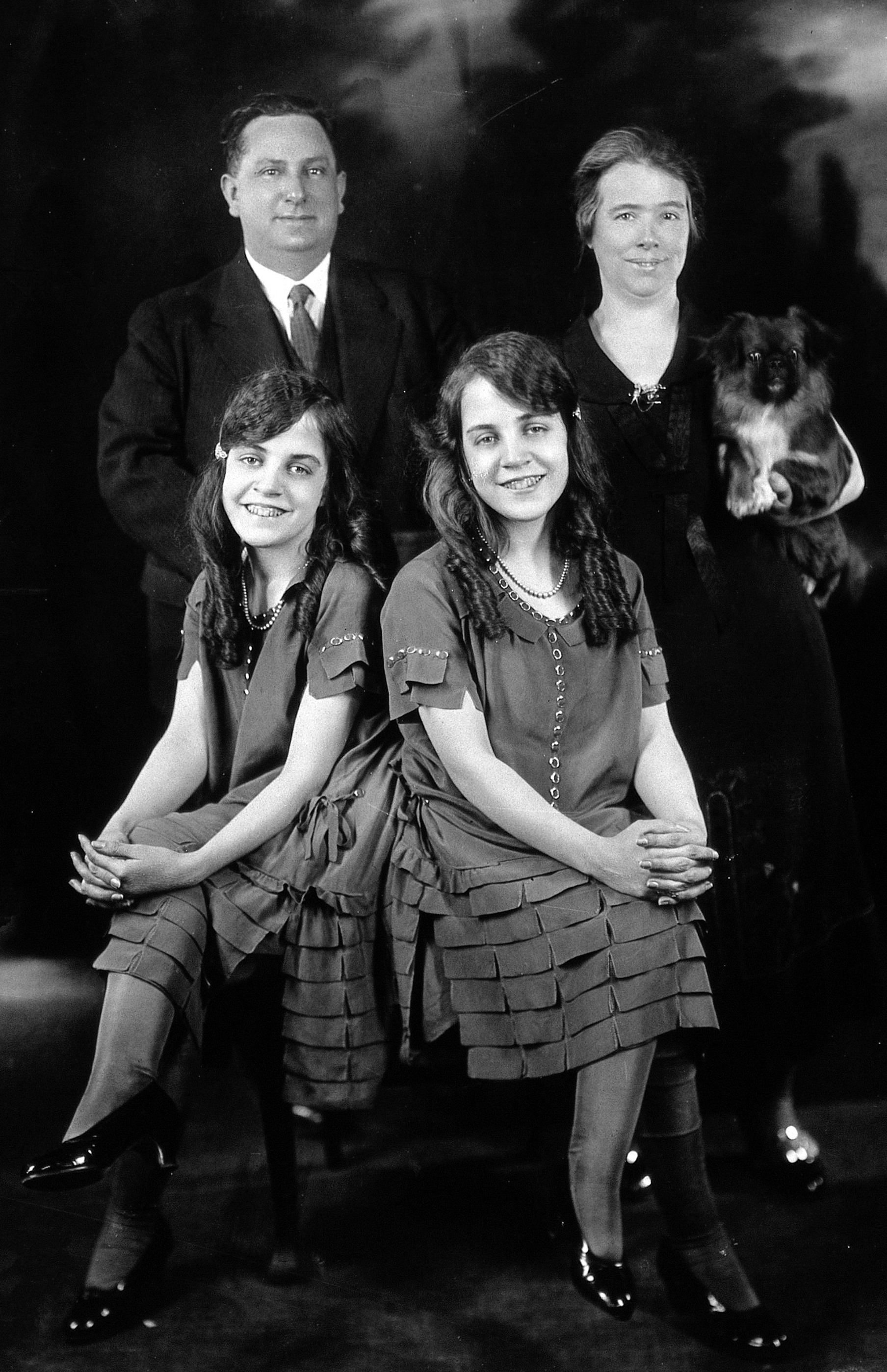
Daisy and Violet with Mr. and Mrs. Meyers c.1927

=== Under the Meyers ===
When Mary died in Birmingham, Alabama, the girls were bequeathed to Mary's daughter Edith Meyers, and Edith's husband Meyer Meyers, a former balloon salesman.

The couple took over management of the twins. Held mostly captive, the girls were punished if they did not do as the Meyers wished. They kept the twins from public view for a while and trained them in jazz music. Violet was a skilled saxophonist and Daisy a violinist. They lived in a mansion in San Antonio, Texas.

In 1931, the sisters sued their managers and were legally emancipated, gaining freedom from their contract and awarded US$100,000 in damages (equivalent to $1,700,000 in 2024).

=== Independent careers ===
Following their emancipation from the Meyers, they went into vaudeville as "The Hilton Sisters' Revue". Daisy dyed her hair blonde and they began to wear different outfits so as to be distinguishable from each other. After vaudeville lost popularity, the sisters performed at burlesque venues.

Shortly after gaining independence from the Meyers, the Hiltons sailed to the UK on the Berengaria in December, 1932. They spent most of 1933 in the UK and returned to the US in October, 1933.

In 1932, the twins appeared in the Metro-Goldwyn-Mayer film Freaks. Afterwards, their popularity faded, and they struggled to make a living in show business.

In 1952, the twins starred in a second film, Chained for Life, an exploitation film loosely based on their lives. Afterwards, they undertook personal appearances at double-bill screenings of their two films.

The Hiltons' last public appearance was in 1961, at a drive-in theater in Charlotte, North Carolina. Without warning, their tour manager abandoned them there with no means of transportation or income.

=== Life after show business ===
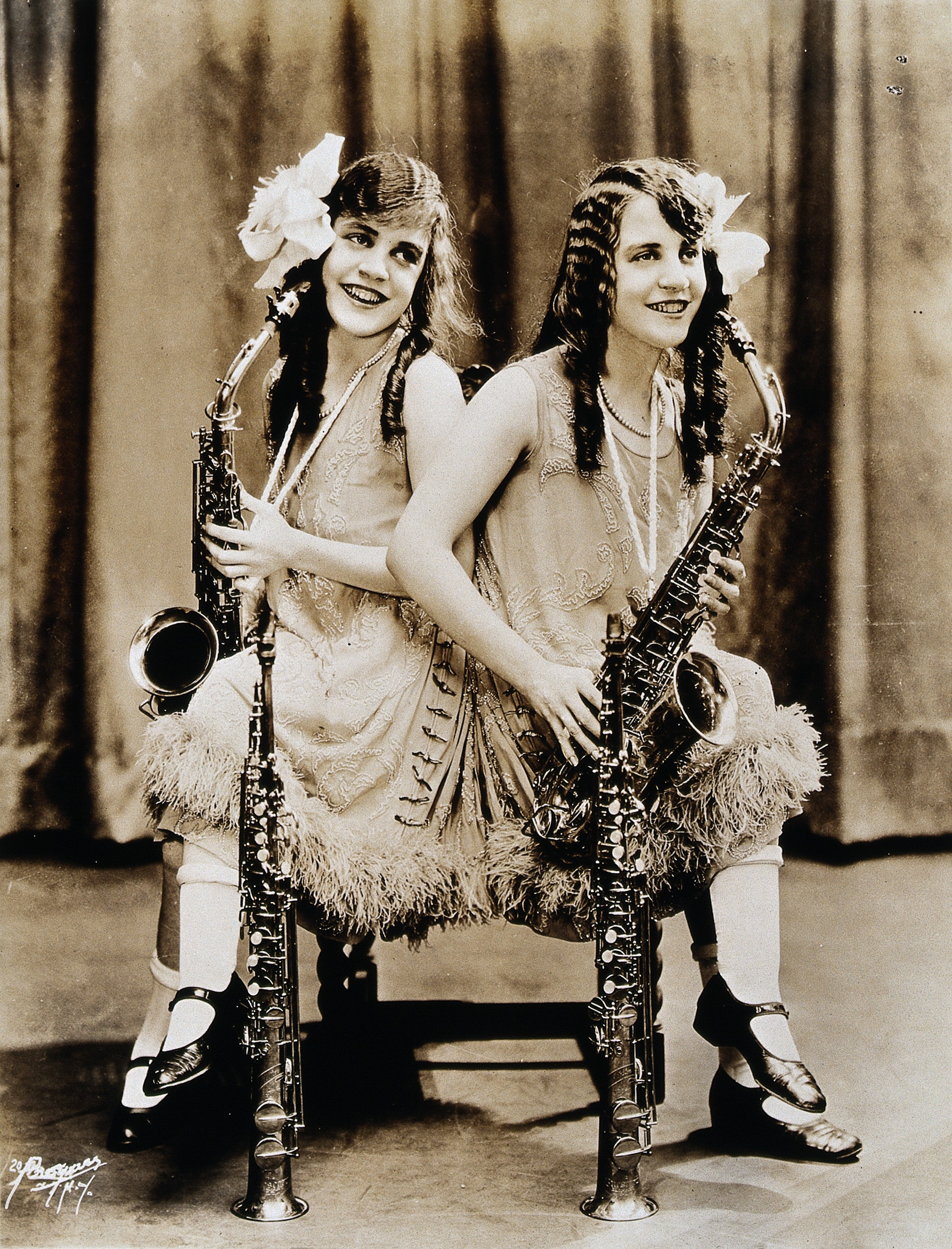
Daisy and Violet Hilton photographed with saxophones, c. 1927.

After their sudden break from their manager, they applied for a job in a nearby grocery store, offering to work for one salary. The owner hired them at two full salaries and designed a discreet two-person cashier station so that customers could not tell the sisters were conjoined.

The Hiltons rented a small two bedroom home courtesy of the shop owner's church, Purcell United Methodist, and settled into a quiet life, involving work and church. During the holidays they remembered fellow employees and favorite customers with Christmas gifts.

== Marriage and relationships ==
Following their legal emancipation in 1931, Daisy and Violet gained greater control over both their careers and their personal lives. Their romantic relationships attracted widespread public attention, while their status as conjoined twins created legal and social barriers to marriage.

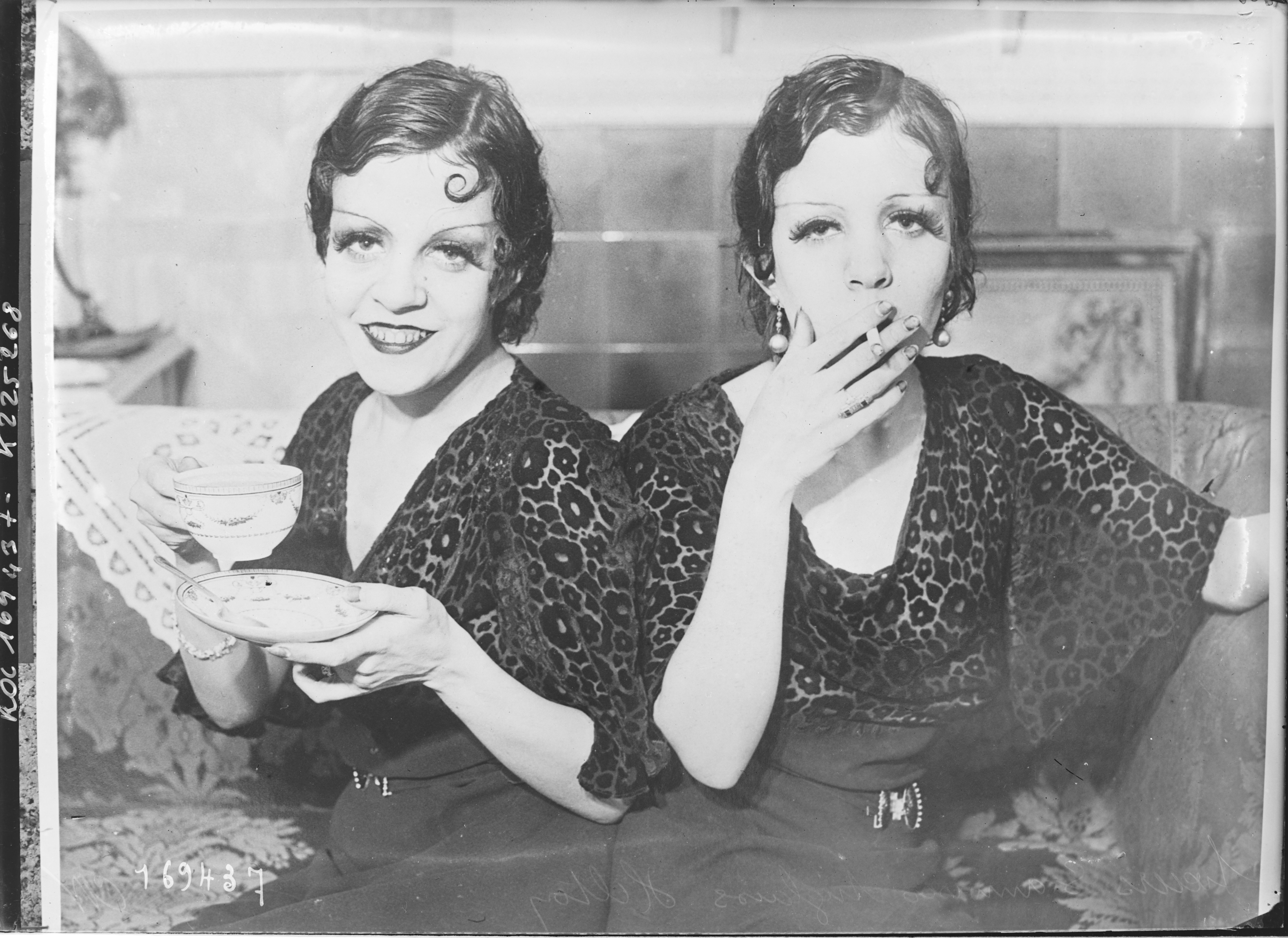
Hilton sisters, circa 1933

In the early 1930s, while in their early twenties, Violet began a relationship with musician Maurice Lambert. The couple applied for marriage licences in 21 U.S. states, but every application was refused.

Later in the decade, Violet became engaged to boxer Harry Mason, although they never married. Mason later began a relationship with her sister, Daisy.

In 1936, at the age of 28, Violet married actor James Moore in a ceremony staged as a publicity event. At the time of the wedding, her sister, Daisy, was visibly pregnant. Daisy later gave birth to a son, who was placed for adoption.

Five years later, in 1941, at the age of 33, Daisy married dancer Harold Estep, better known by his stage name Buddy Sawyer. Their marriage ended after ten days.

== Death ==
On January 4, 1969, after they did not report to work and attempts to reach them by telephone failed, the police were called to investigate. The twins were found dead in their home, victims of the Hong Kong flu. According to the autopsy, Daisy died first; Violet died between two and four days later. Violet had not called for any help.

== Media legacy ==
In 1989, a musical based on the Hilton twins, Twenty Fingers Twenty Toes, with book by Michael Dansicker and Bob Nigro and music and lyrics by Michael Dansicker, premiered at the WPA Theatre and ran for 35 performances. The script can be found in the New York Public Library for the Performing Arts. It began as an accurate portrayal of the twins' early life, but then included a wholly fictitious plot by their keepers to have them surgically separated as adults.

Side Show, a Broadway musical loosely based on the sisters' lives, with lyrics by Bill Russell and music by Henry Krieger, opened at the Richard Rodgers Theater on October 16, 1997. It starred Emily Skinner as Daisy and Alice Ripley as Violet, and received four Tony Award nominations, but closed after 91 performances. In 2014, a substantially rewritten version of the musical was mounted at the Kennedy Center and moved to Broadway, where it opened at the St. James Theater on November 17, 2014, starring Erin Davie as Violet and Emily Padgett as Daisy. Although well-reviewed, the revival closed on 4 January 2015.

In 2012, Leslie Zemeckis filmed a documentary, Bound by Flesh, about the sisters' lives. The Hollywood Reporter called it "scrupulously researched" and a "masterful film". The film won Best Documentary awards at both the 2012 Hollywood Film Festival and the 2013 Louisiana International Film Festival.

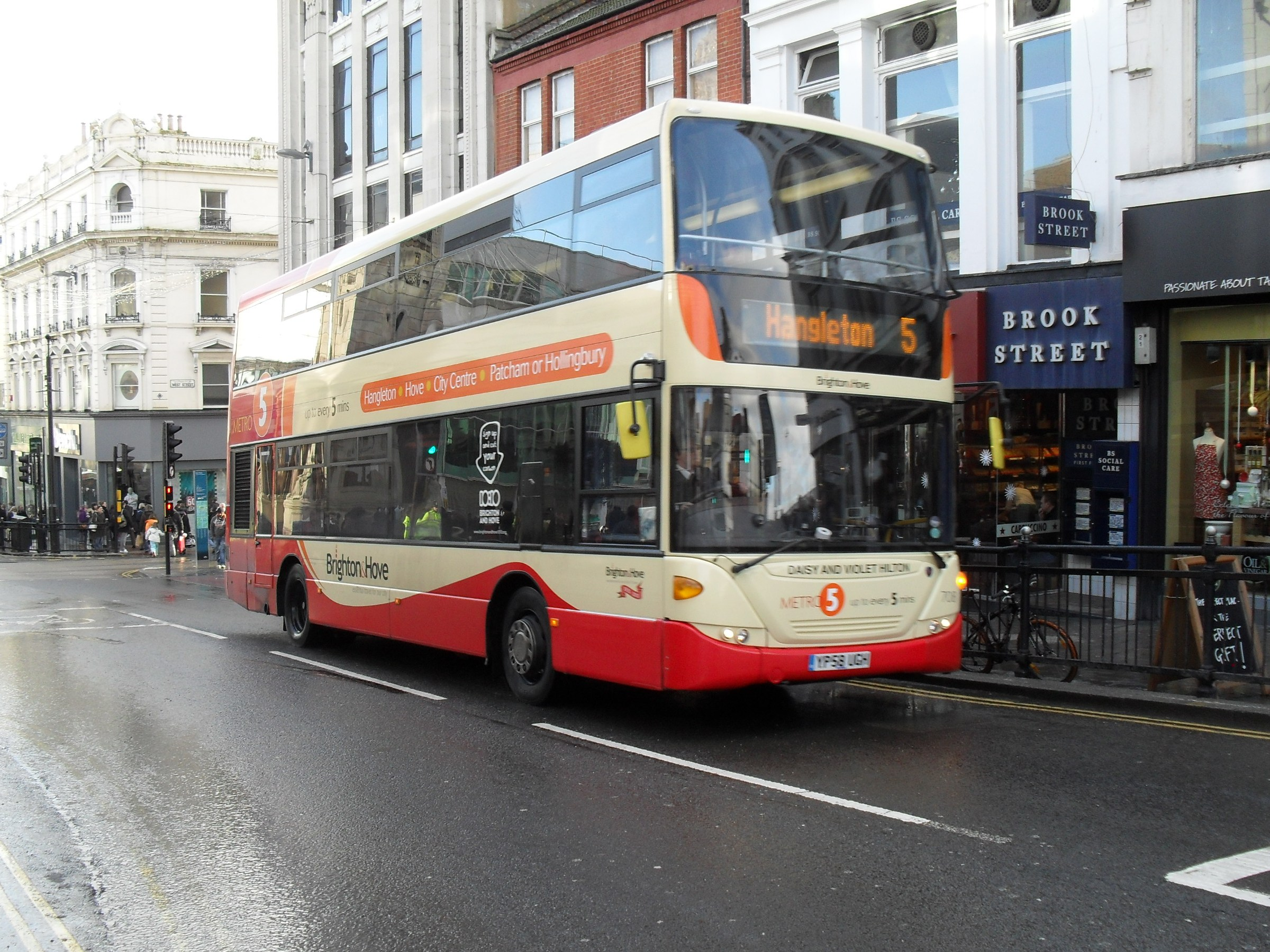
Brighton & Hove no. 708 has been named in their honour

== Other legacy ==
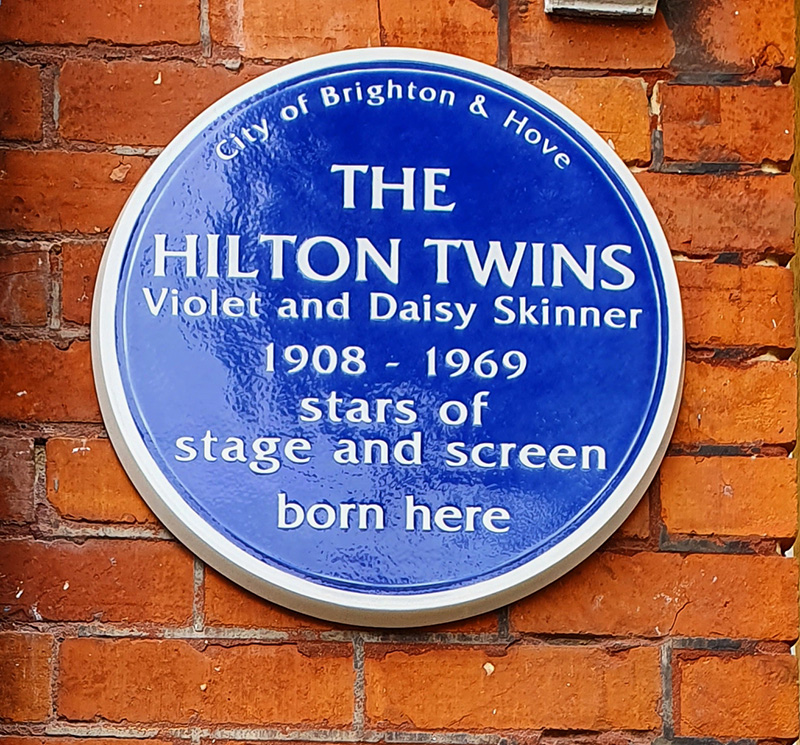
Blue plaque at 18 Riley Road

Brighton & Hove 316 (YX69 NWD), a 2019 Enviro400ER bus that currently operates in their home town, was named in their honour.

In May 2018, it was announced that Brighton and Hove City Council and the current owner of the house in which the twins were born had agreed that a commemorative blue plaque could be erected at the property. On 26 May 2022, a commemorative blue plaque was unveiled at 18 Riley Road, dedicated to them.

The first story in Megan Mayhew Bergman's 2015 short story collection Almost Famous Women, entitled "The Pretty, Grown-Together Children," is based on the Hilton twins.

== Filmography ==
- The Unholy Three (1925)
- Freaks (1932)
- Chained for Life (1952)
