= Harry Smith (footballer, born 1916) =

Australian rules footballer, born 1916

Personal information
- Full name: Henry James Smith
- Born: 9 July 1916; Richmond, Victoria
- Died: 25 February 1983 (aged 66); Little Bay, New South Wales
- Original team: Ormond Amateurs
- Height: 173 cm (5 ft 8 in)
- Weight: 74 kg (163 lb)

Playing career^{1}
Years	Club	Games (Goals)
1938–39	Richmond	19 (2)
- ^{1} Playing statistics correct to the end of 1939.

Henry James Smith (9 July 1916 – 25 February 1983) was an Australian rules footballer who played with Richmond in the Victorian Football League (VFL).
