= Harry Smith (footballer, born 1894) =

English footballer

Personal information
- Full name: Harry Charles Smith
- Date of birth: 1894
- Place of birth: Litchborough, England
- Position: Goalkeeper

Senior career*
Years	Team	Apps	(Gls)
1920–1926	Northampton Town	173	(0)
1926	Higham Town		
Total		173	(0)
- * Club domestic league appearances and goals

Harry Charles Smith (1894–unknown) was an English footballer who played in the Football League for Northampton Town.
