= Henry Smith (priest) =

Henry Smith (1705-1765) was an 18th-century Irish Anglican priest.

Smith was born in County Limerick and educated at Trinity College, Dublin. He was Archdeacon of Glendalough from 1760 to 1764.
