= Henry Smith (attorney) =

Henry Smith was a Bristol attorney-at-law and amateur artist who was forced to flee the country in 1809 after a duel in which he killed his opponent. His travels around Scotland and later Spain and Portugal during the Peninsula War (where he served in the army under Wellington) were recorded in a diary (1809–1810) which is now kept at the University of Kansas. He subsequently returned to the United Kingdom for trial but was discharged without one.

== Early life ==
Henry Smith was born on 28 December 1774 at Queens Square Bristol, the son of Richard Smith, surgeon, and Augusta, the daughter of Rev. Alexander Stopford Catcott and sister of Rev Alexander Catcott.
