= Harry Lester Smith =

Harry Lester Smith was an American Bishop of the Methodist Episcopal Church and The Methodist Church. Smith was elected to this office by the 1920 M.E. General Conference.

== Education and ordination ==
In his youth, H. Lester Smith felt the urge to abandon his early choice of an industrial career in the oil fields of Pennsylvania and turn his steps toward educational preparation for ordained ministry. Harry entered Allegheny College in 1900 and served in a student pastorate.

The Rev. Harry Lester Smith entered the Pittsburgh Annual Conference of the M.E. Church also in 1900 as a Member On Trial. He graduated from college in 1904 with a Phi Beta Kappa. He then entered the Drew Theological Seminary, taking the full three years' course in only two years.

== Marriage and Family ==
Harry married Ida L. Martin, who was an active youth worker in one of the churches he pastored. One son, Edward Marshall, was born to this marriage, who died at the age of thirty-five.

== Ordained ministry ==
The Rev. Harry Lester Smith served as an Associate Pastor of the Methodist Church at Bellevue, near Pittsburgh. After this service he had the unusual distinction of being appointed the Senior Pastor of the same church. After three years service in that appointment, the Rev. Smith was appointed to the Delaware Avenue M.E. Church in Buffalo, New York. After a brief pastorate, he was sent to Detroit to pastor the Central Methodist Church. He filled this appointment for eight years. During this time, his skill and interest in the work of the church was noticed, causing thought that he would be a suitable candidate for bishop.
