= Henry Pember Smith =

American painter

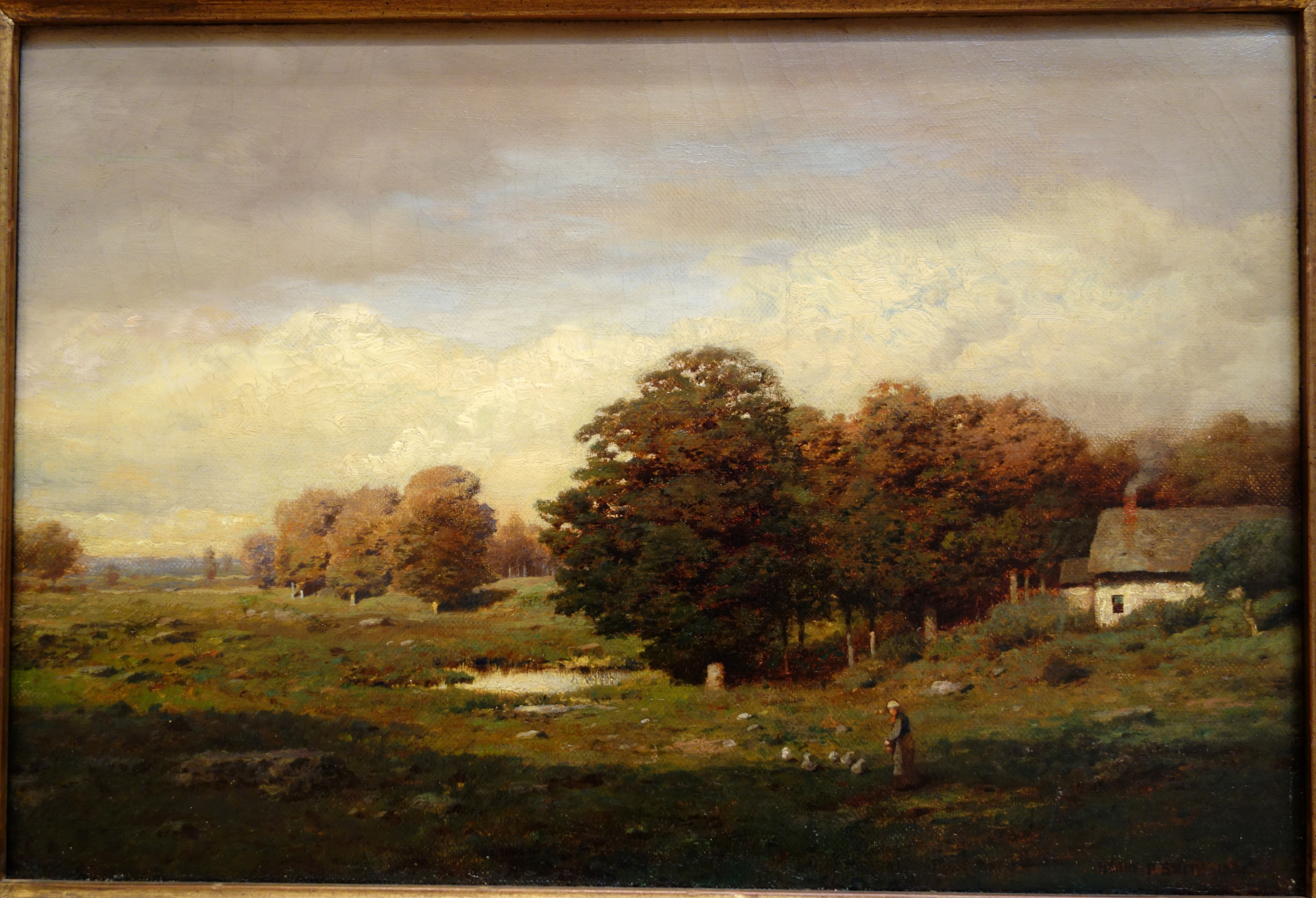
Landscape, undated

Henry Pember Smith (February 20, 1854 – October 16, 1907) was an American painter, best known for his depictions of country cottages and river scenes around Lyme and East Lyme, Connecticut, and paintings of the sea and shore in New Jersey, Rhode Island, and Cape Ann to Maine.

Smith was born in Waterford, Connecticut. During the 1880s, he studied the Old Masters in Paris, Brittany, Normandy, Venice and along the English Cornish coast. He was a member of the Artists' Fund Society and the American Water Color Society, and exhibited at the National Academy of Design from 1877 to 1896, 1899, 1901, 1906; the Brooklyn Art Club (1878-1885, 1892); Boston Art Club (1880-1890); Pennsylvania Academy of Fine Art (1881, 1888); and the Art Institute of Chicago. Smith died of heart disease in Asbury Park, New Jersey.
