= Meadow Bridge =

Meadow Bridge may refer to a location in the United States:

- Meadow Bridge, West Virginia, a town
- Meadow Bridge (Shelburne, New Hampshire), a bridge

== See also ==
- Battle of Meadow Bridge, an 1864 skirmish near Richmond, Virginia, in the American Civil War
