= Howe Township, Pennsylvania =

Howe Township is the name of some places in the U.S. state of Pennsylvania:

- Howe Township, Forest County, Pennsylvania
- Howe Township, Perry County, Pennsylvania
