= Hickory Township, Pennsylvania =

Hickory Township, Pennsylvania may refer to several places in the U.S. state of Pennsylvania:

- Hickory Township, Forest County, Pennsylvania
- Hickory Township, Lawrence County, Pennsylvania
