= Harmony Township, Pennsylvania =

Harmony Township may refer to the following places in the United States:

- Harmony Township, Beaver County, Pennsylvania
- Harmony Township, Forest County, Pennsylvania
- Harmony Township, Susquehanna County, Pennsylvania

== See also ==
- Harmony, Pennsylvania
