= New Sharon Bridge =

- Formerly listed on the U.S. National Register of Historic Places
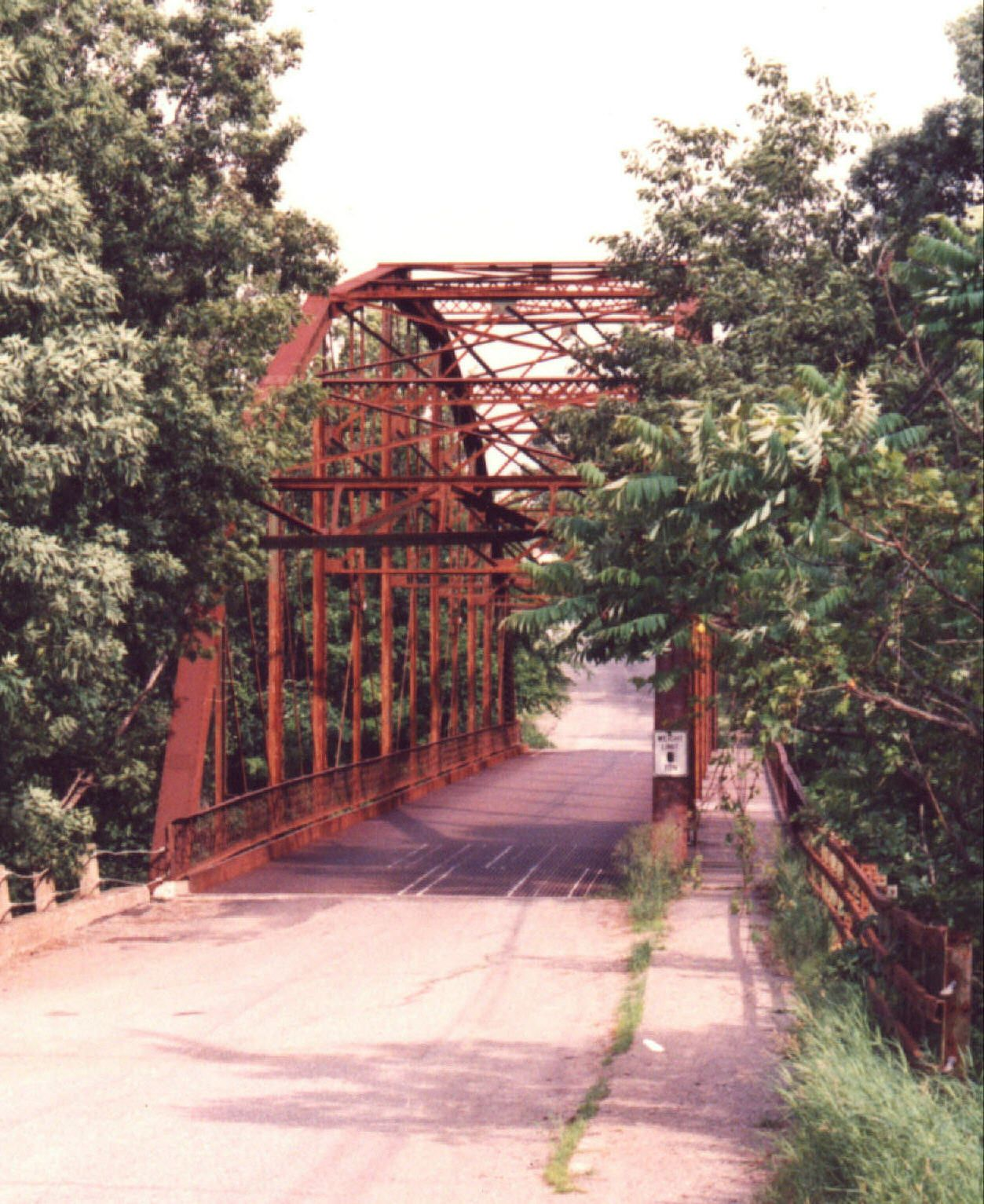
- The bridge in 2001

- Location within Maine
- Location: S of US 2 over Sandy River, New Sharon, Maine
- Coordinates: 44°38′16″N 70°0′56″W
- Area: less than one acre
- Built: 1916
- Architect: Greenwood, E. E.; Groton Bridge Co.
- Architectural style: Pennsylvania Thru Truss
- NRHP reference No.: 99001189

Significant dates
- Added to NRHP: September 24, 1999
- Removed from NRHP: July 14, 2015

The New Sharon Bridge was a single-span iron Pennsylvania truss that carried U.S. Route 2 (US 2) over the Sandy River in New Sharon, Maine. The bridge was built in 1916, closed to traffic in the 1990s, and was demolished on February 27, 2014. It had been listed on the National Register of Historic Places as one of only three pin-connected Pennsylvania truss bridges in the state.

== Description and history ==
The bridge was oriented roughly northwest to southeast, crossing the Sandy River adjacent to the center of New Sharon. It was a single-span, pin-connected, Pennsylvania truss, one of only three such bridges built in the state. The bridge was manufactured by the Groton Bridge Co. and erected in 1916 on concrete abutments with ashlar granite wingwalls. The bridge was 268 feet (82 m) long and had a sidewalk cantilevered over its upstream side. It had a steel grid deck giving a roadway 18.5 feet (5.6 m) in width.

When the current alignment of US 2 was built in 1959, a modern span was built downstream to carry it, and the road this bridge carried was designated Main Street. The bridge was closed by the state in the 1990s because of its deteriorating condition. Further cracking in the abutments over time led to the decision in 2013 to demolish it. The bridge was brought down on February 27, 2014. Explosive charges meant to accomplish the feat failed to do so, apparently because the aging concrete of the abutments absorbed the force of the blast. Large jackhammers were brought in to finish the job.

== See also ==
- National Register of Historic Places listings in Franklin County, Maine
- List of bridges on the National Register of Historic Places in Maine
