= Endeavor, Pennsylvania =

Unincorporated community in Pennsylvania, U.S.

Coordinates: 41°35′22″N 79°23′06″W

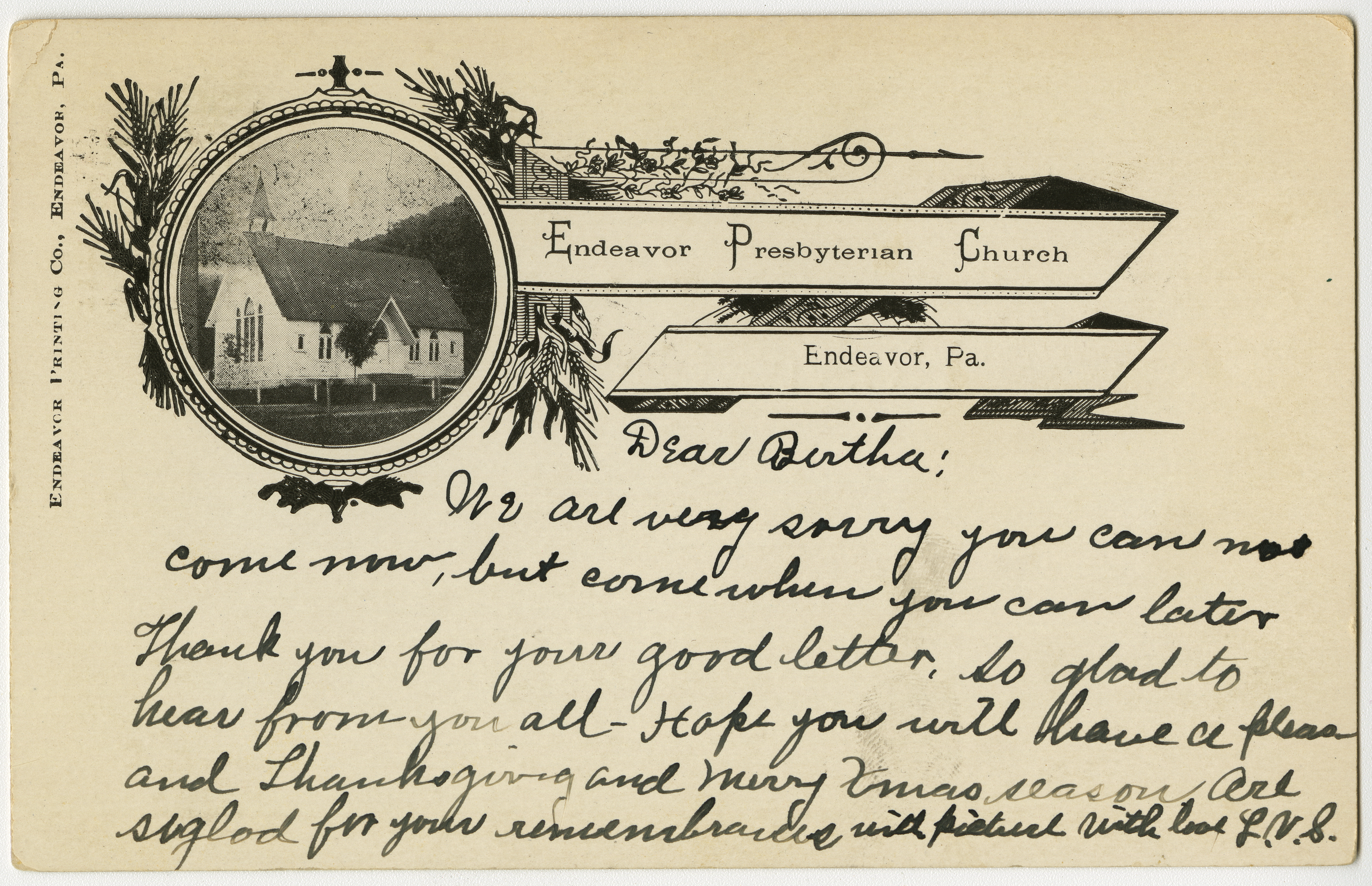
Pre-1923 postcard showing the Endeavor Presbyterian Church, Endeavor, Pennsylvania

Endeavor is a community in Hickory Township, Forest County, Pennsylvania, along Allegheny National Forest, on Pennsylvania Route 666.

== History ==
The community was named after the Christian Endeavor Society, who were the original inhabitants of the town. Before it was called Endeavor, it was called Stowtown.
