= Plata Bridge =

Historic bridge in Bayamón and Naranjito municipalities, Puerto Rico

- U.S. National Register of Historic Places
- Puerto Rico Historic Sites and Zones
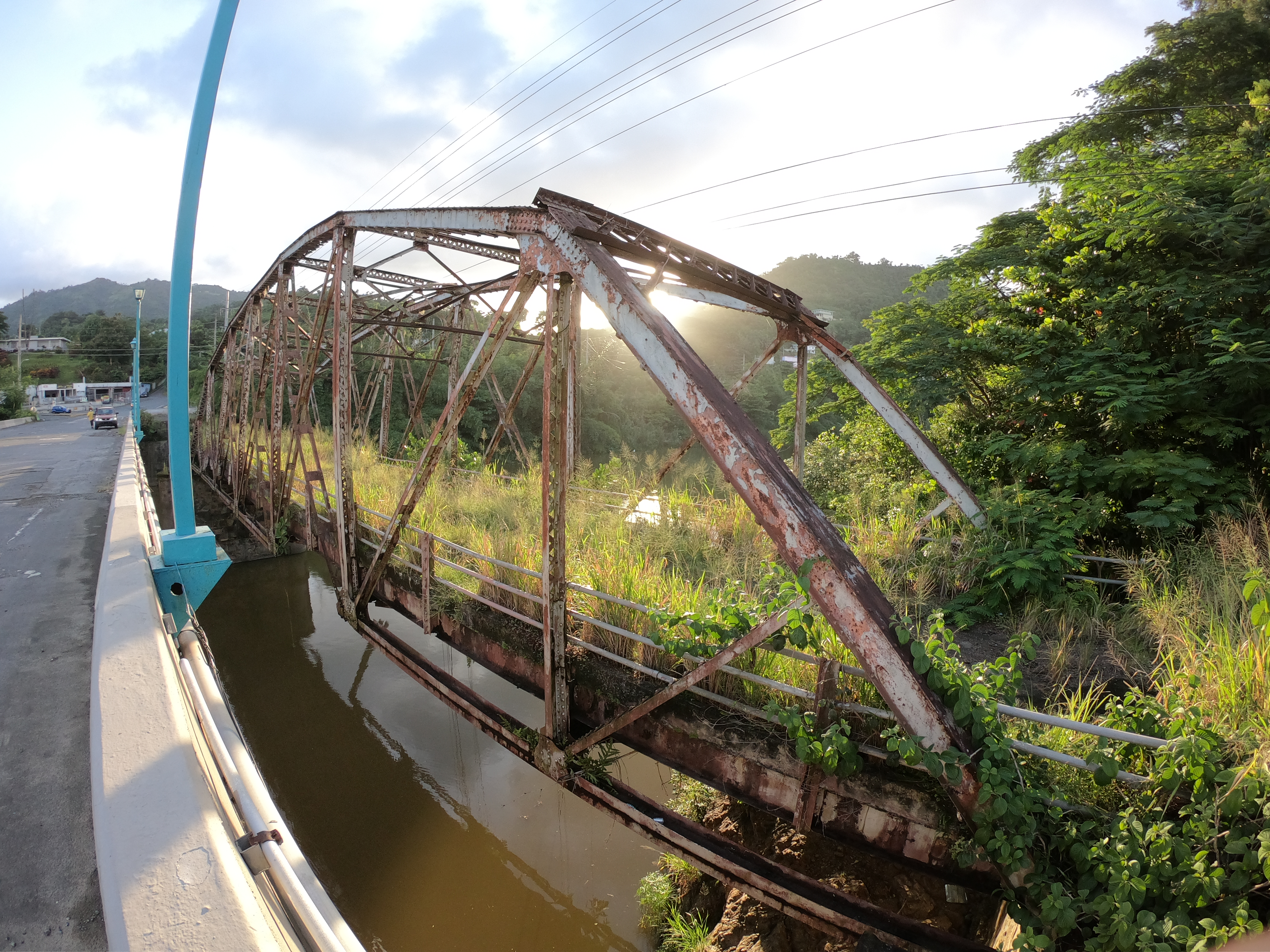

- Location within Puerto Rico
- Location: Bayamón / Naranjito, Puerto Rico
- Coordinates: 18°18′14″N 66°12′41″W
- Built: 1908
- Built by: American Bridge Co., Groton Bridge Co., Jose Lago
- Architectural style: Parker truss
- MPS: Historic Bridges of Puerto Rico MPS
- NRHP reference No.: 95000849
- RNSZH No.: 2000-(RMSJ)-00-JP-SH

Significant dates
- Added to NRHP: July 19, 1995
- Designated RNSZH: February 3, 2000

Plata Bridge (Spanish: Puente Plata), listed in Puerto Rico's bridge inventory as Bridge #374 and now also known as Antiguo Puente Plata, was built in 1908. It is significant as "the only extant large multi span truss bridge in Puerto Rico", according to its nomination document for listing on the National Register of Historic Places. It includes two Parker truss spans and was built in 1908. It brought what is now Puerto Rico Highway 167 across the Rio La Plata, spanning from Bayamon municipality and into Naranjito, and connected several mountain towns to the coastal road along Puerto Rico's north coast.

It consists of two steel Parker trusses, each span of length 42 metres (138 ft), atop massive masonry supports, 40 feet (12 m) tall. The masonry includes ashlar buttresses and relief decoration. A contractor, Jose Lago, built its masonry supports for $9,000. The trusses cost $13,228 and were manufactured by the prolific American Bridge Co. They were installed by American Bridge Co.'s subsidiary Groton Bridge Co. It was one of nine steel bridges built in 1908 that were financed by Puerto Rico's first public works bond issue, of 1906, which raised $1 million.

It was listed on the National Register of Historic Places in 1995 and on the Puerto Rico Register of Historic Sites and Zones in 2000. At the time, the setting was relatively unchanged from its date of construction, although a modern bridge had been built adjacent to it. And it was deemed to have "a high degree of integrity of design, workmanship, feeling, association, materials, and setting." Its condition was then judged "fair".

It is now unused. The modern bridge that carries traffic is on the upstream side of the historic bridge. Faster connection to the coast is now provided by Puerto Rico Highway 5, which crosses the Rio la Plata on the cable-stayed Jesús Izcoa Moure Bridge about 2 miles (3.2 km) downstream. On August 28, 2017 the bridge collapsed, thus being an unstable half of the historic bridge.

== Gallery ==
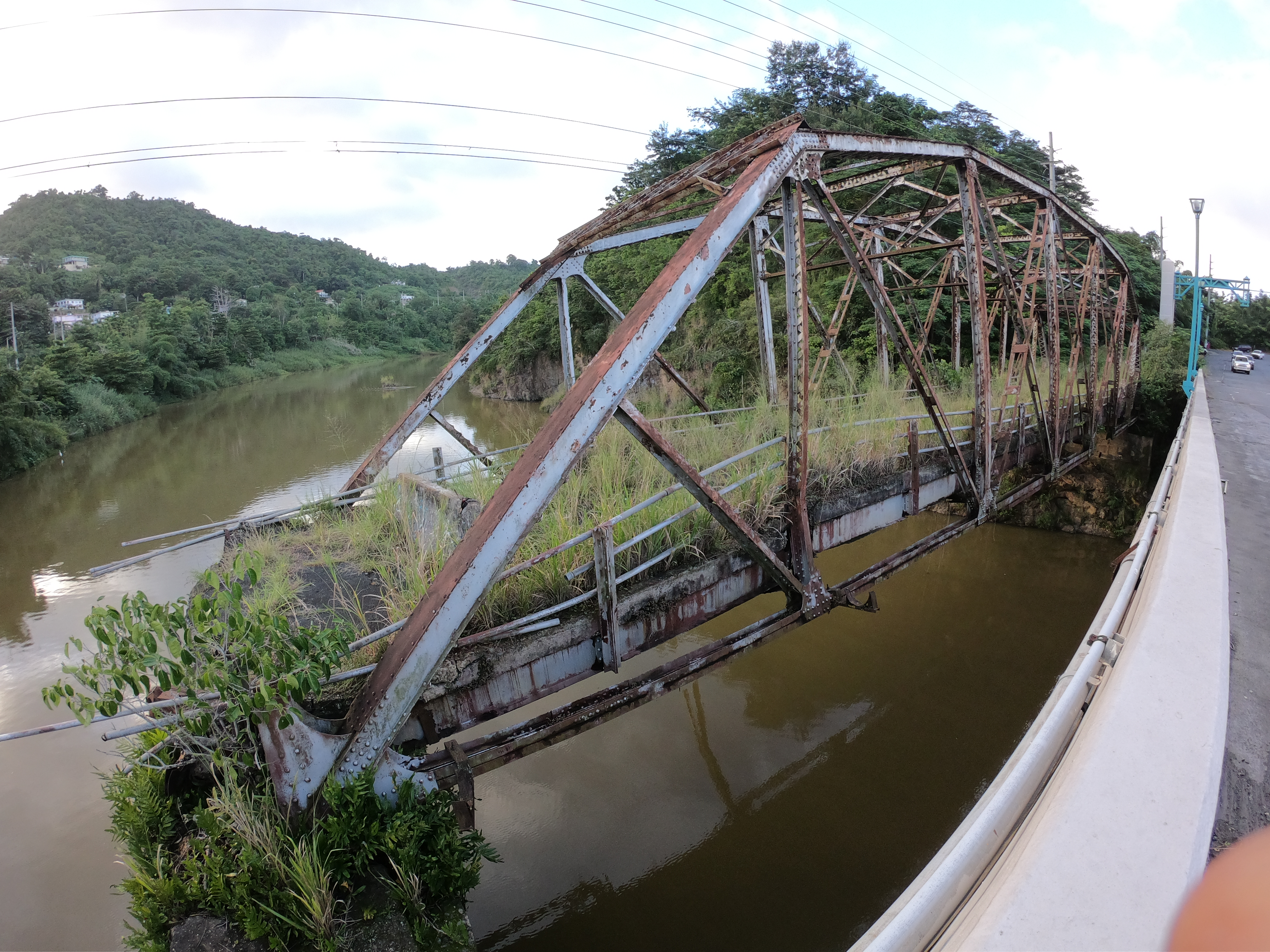
Plata Bridge remains

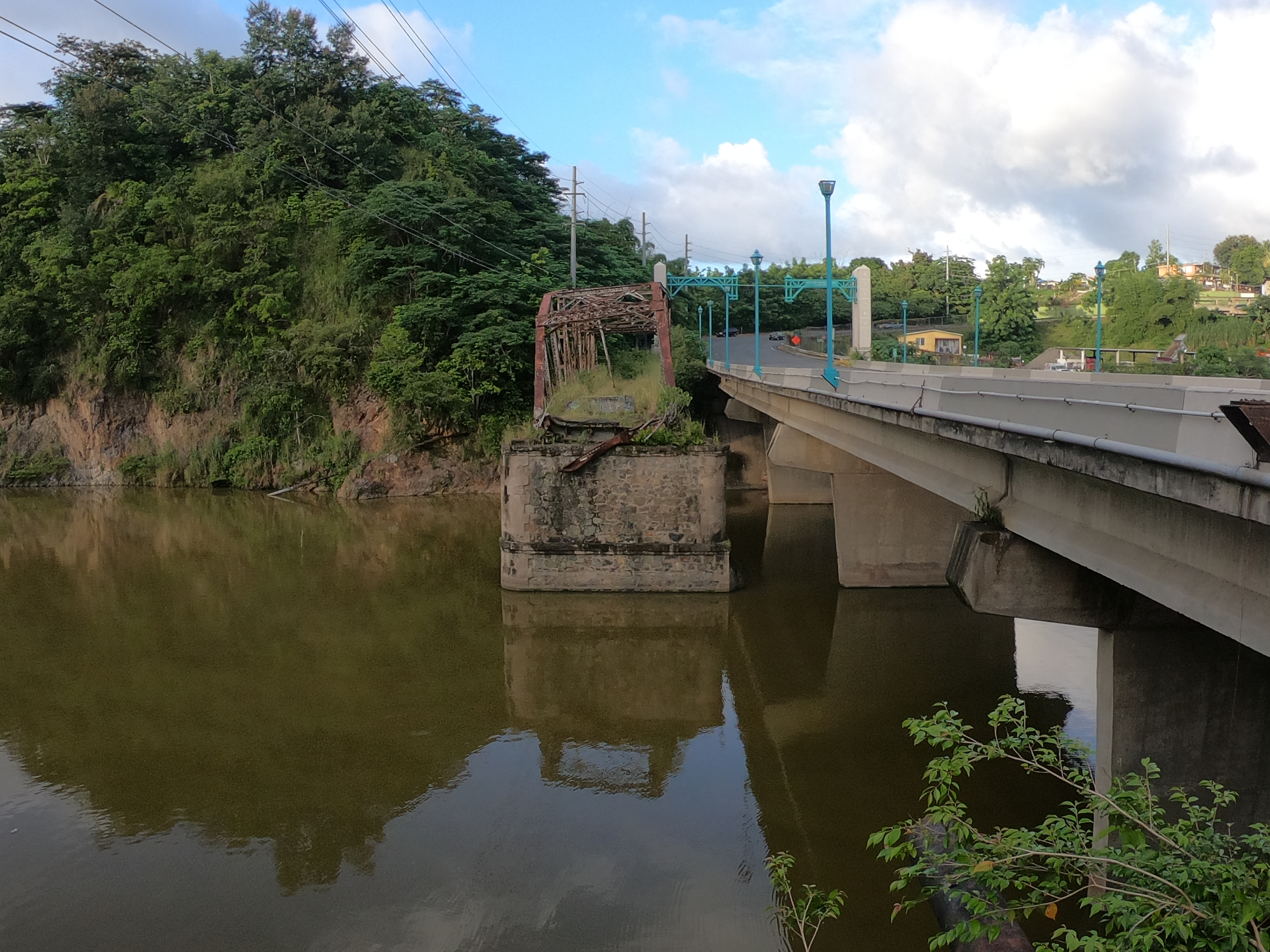
What remains of the Plata Bridge from the shore

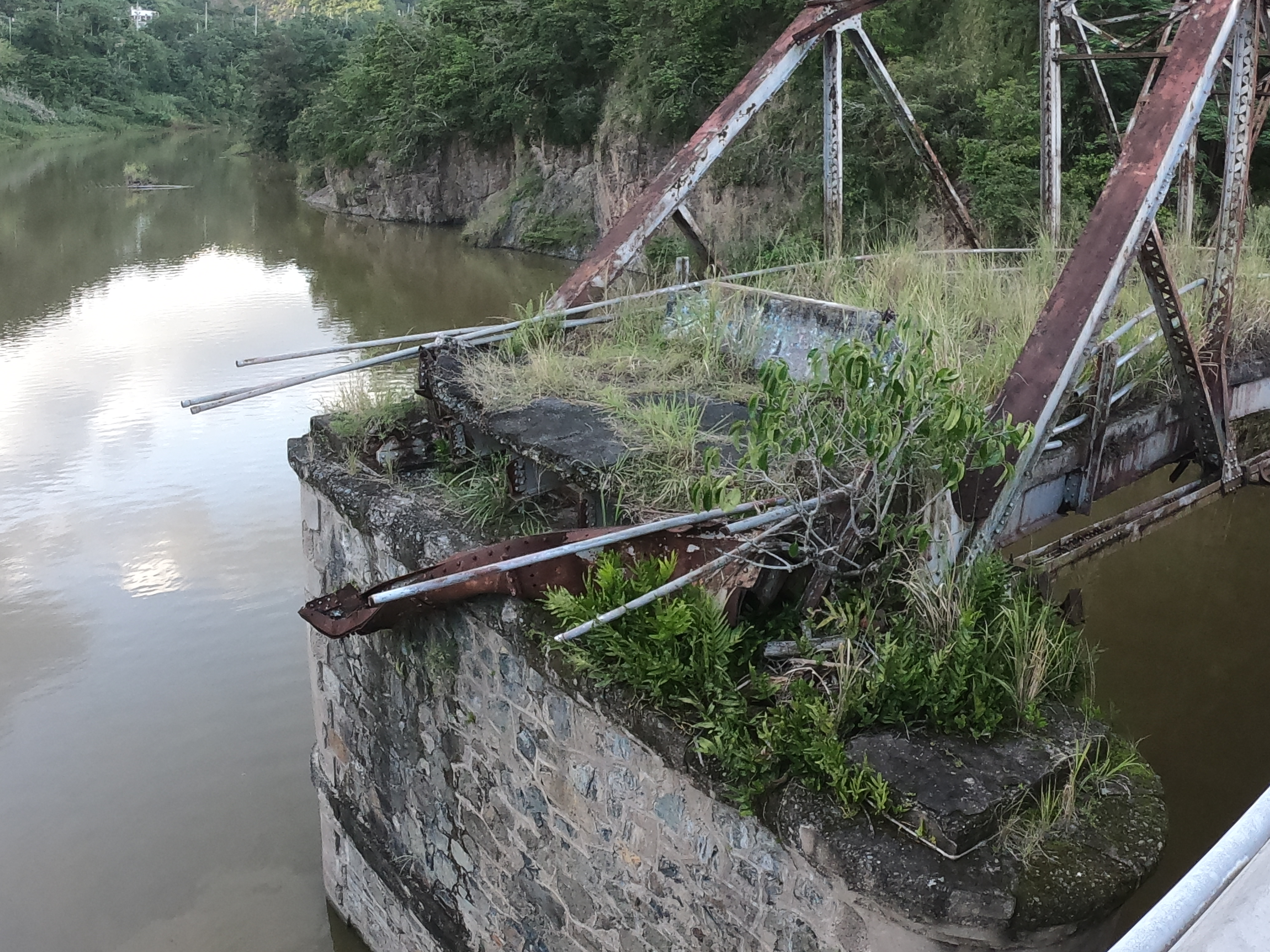
Part of Plata Bridge collapsed
