= Caneadea Bridge =

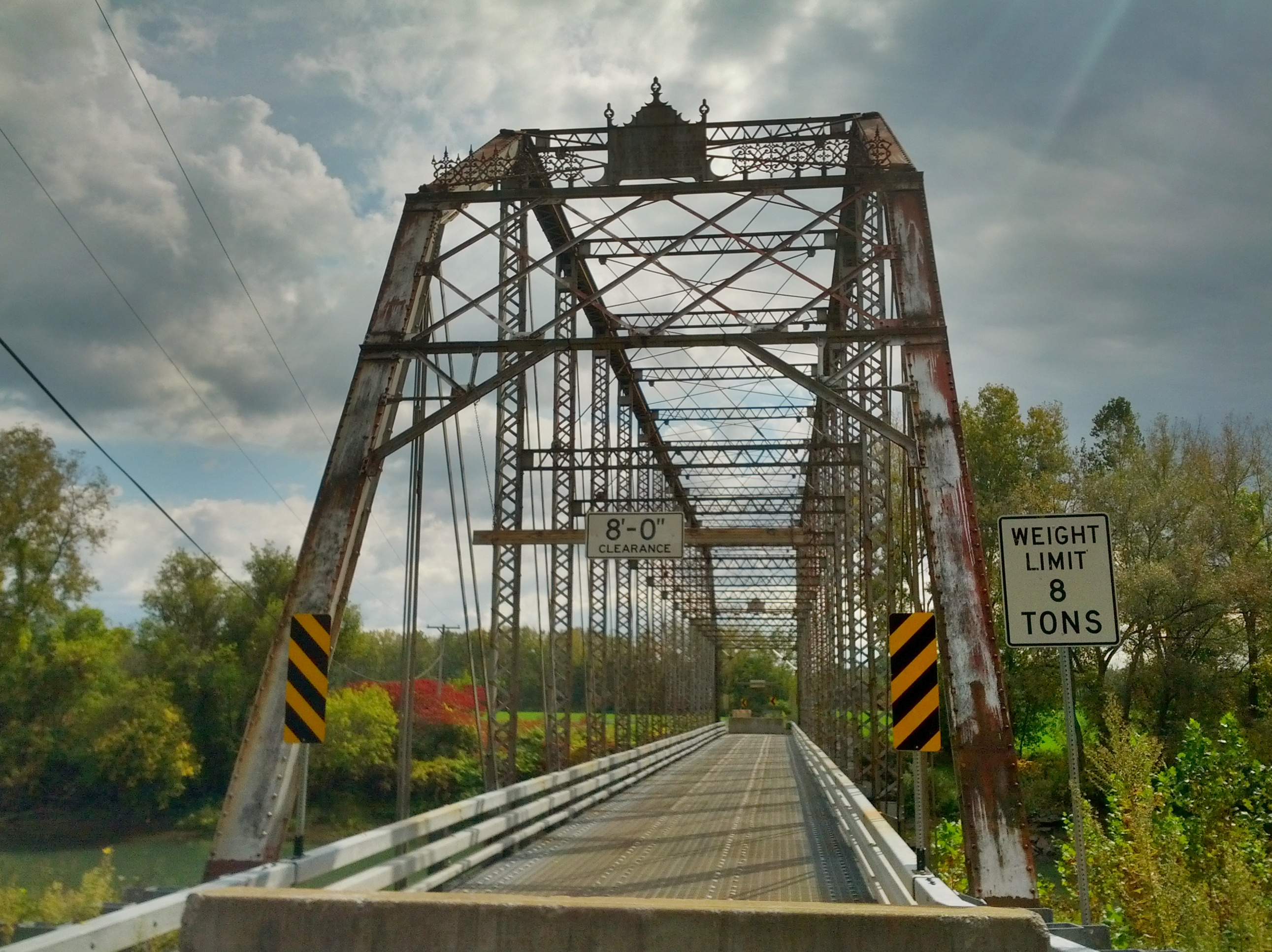
- Caneadea Bridge, September 2012
- Coordinates: 42°23′06″N 78°09′00″W
- Carries: County Road 46
- Crosses: Genesee River
- Locale: Caneadea, New York

Characteristics
- Design: Camel Parker Truss
- Total length: 246 feet (75 m)
- Width: 14 feet (4.3 m)
- Clearance above: about 15 feet (4.6 m)

History
- Designer: Groton Iron Bridge Co.
- Caneadea Bridge
- U.S. National Register of Historic Places
- Location within New York Location within the United States
- Coordinates: 42°23′6″N 78°8′59″W
- Area: 1 acre (0.40 ha)
- NRHP reference No.: 98001388
- Added to NRHP: November 19, 1998

Location
- Interactive map of Caneadea Bridge

Caneadea Bridge, also known as East Hill Road Bridge, is a historic steel truss bridge that carries County Road 46 (locally East Hill Road) over the Genesee River in Caneadea, Allegany County, New York. It is listed on the National Register of Historic Places.

== History ==
In 1902, a catastrophic flood washed away the previous bridge. Shortly after, the town of Caneadea hired the Groton Iron Bridge Company for a replacement span; the new bridge was completed in November 1903.

The bridge was nominated for inclusion on the National Register of Historic Places under Criterion C for its engineering significance as a surviving early twentieth-century bridge. In a NYSDOT survey, it was the oldest and longest of two surviving camelback truss bridges in New York. The bridge was listed on the National Register on November 19, 1998.

In 1993, the Allegany County Department of Public Works declared the bridge unsafe and it was closed because the county could not afford to replace it. The closure was an inconvenience, forcing some drivers to go south and cross the river at Belfast before heading back to Caneadea. The Save the Caneadea Bridge Committee worked for the next fourteen years to raise funds for rehabilitation; an undisclosed sum was raised, plus about $550,000 in state funding. The bridge reopened in 2007, and the remaining $9,037.42 was assigned for maintenance.

The bridge was closed again on June 26, 2012, because of structural deterioration. In August 2012, an engineering firm was hired to study what would need to be done to reopen the bridge to traffic.

== Design ==
The bridge consists of a single-span steel truss, measuring 246 by 14 feet (75.0 by 4.3 m), resting on cut stone abutments. It is a pin-connected, camelback Parker truss design, set about 15 feet (4.6 m) above the river. The ends of the bridge retain the original metal cresting and decorative plates bearing the bridge company name and former town names.

== See also ==
- National Register of Historic Places listings in Allegany County, New York
- List of bridges and tunnels on the National Register of Historic Places in New York
