= West Hickory Bridge =

- Coordinates: 41°34′11″N 79°24′21″W
- Carries: Two lanes of PA 127
- Crosses: Allegheny River
- Locale: Harmony Township and Hickory Township

Characteristics
- Design: Girder bridge
- Total length: 695 ft (212 m)
- Width: 32 ft (9.8 m)

History
- Opened: 2007

Location
- Interactive map of West Hickory Bridge

- West Hickory Bridge
- U.S. National Register of Historic Places
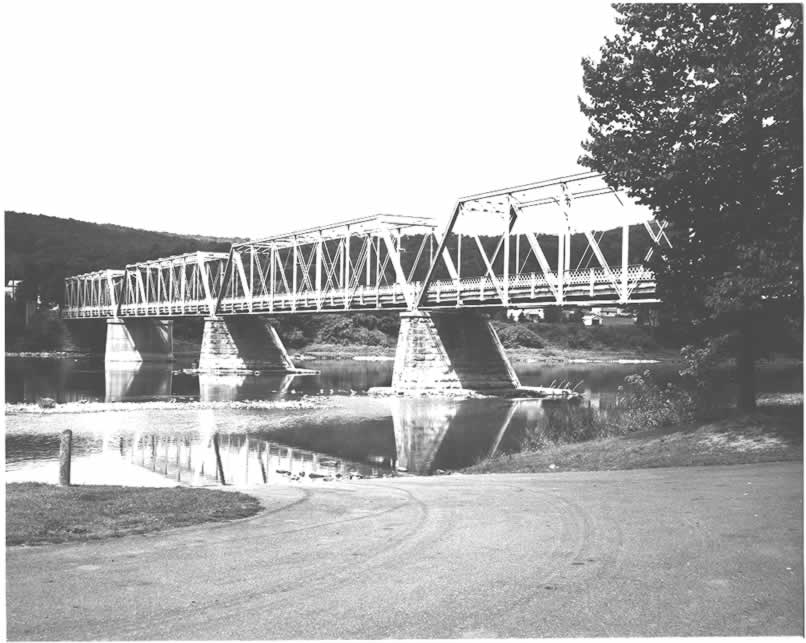
- Old West Hickory Bridge, 1982
- Location: Pennsylvania Route 127 over the Allegheny River at West Hickory, in Hickory Township, Pennsylvania
- Area: less than one acre
- Built: 1896
- Built by: Groton Bridge Co.
- Architectural style: Pratt truss
- MPS: Highway Bridges Owned by the Commonwealth of Pennsylvania, Department of Transportation TR
- NRHP reference No.: 88000835
- Added to NRHP: June 22, 1988

The West Hickory Bridge is a girder bridge that carries Pennsylvania Route 127 across the Allegheny River in rural Forest County, Pennsylvania. Spanning the river between Harmony Township and Hickory Township, it is named for the village of West Hickory.

This 2007 bridge replaced an 1896 one-lane truss bridge, which was designed for non-motorized traffic. It was a multiple span, Pratt truss bridge built by the Groton Bridge Company and measured 695 feet, 6 inches, in length. The old bridge was added to the National Register of Historic Places in 1988. Despite the low use of the bridge (only about 900 drivers per day), it was considered to be in need of replacement.

== See also ==
- List of crossings of the Allegheny River
