= Town Line Bridge =

- U.S. National Register of Historic Places
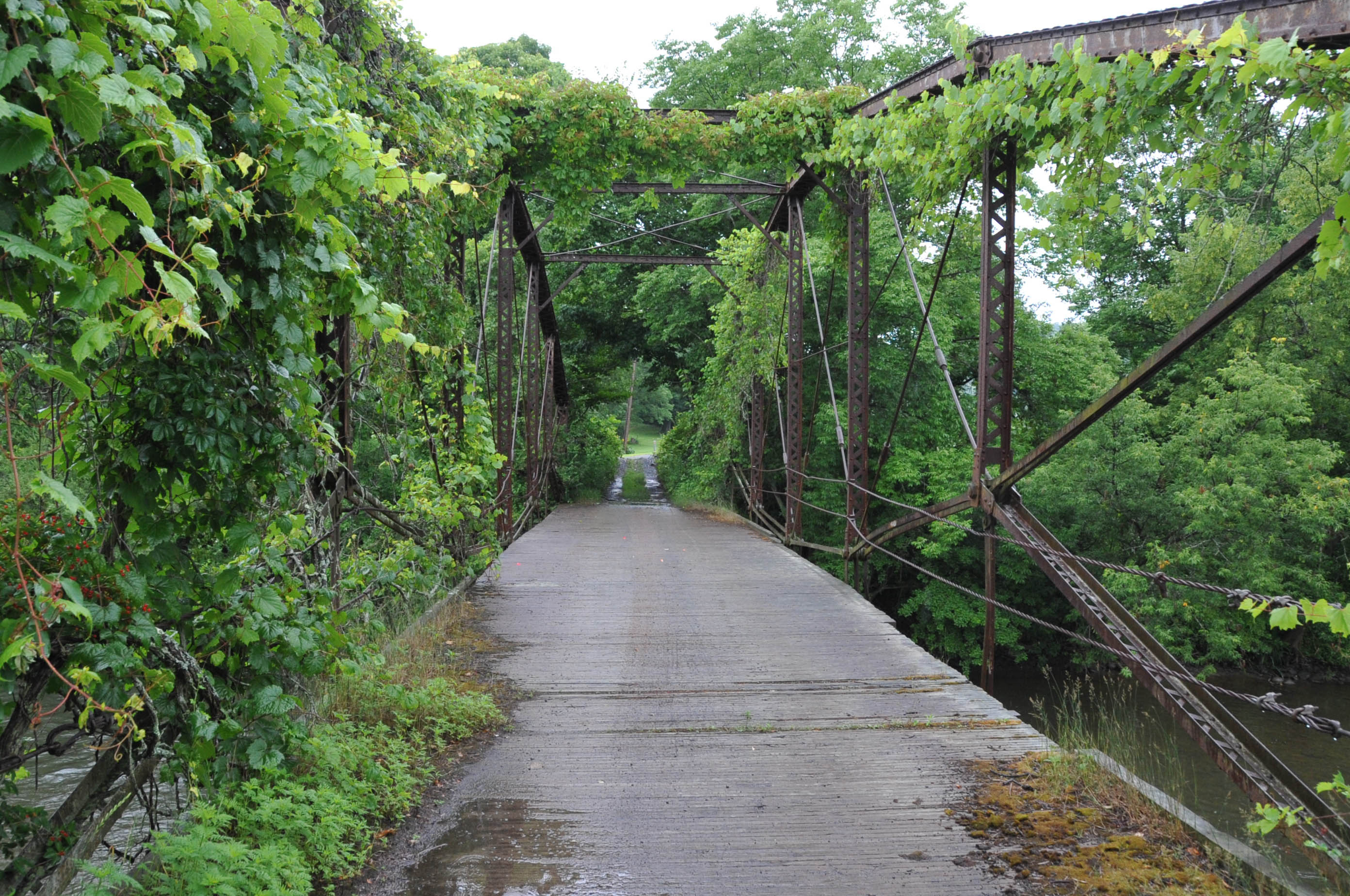

- Location within New York Location within the United States
- Location: Town Line Road, Taylor, New York
- Coordinates: 42°33′57″N 75°52′57″W
- Area: less than one acre
- Built: 1888
- Architect: Berlin Iron Bridge Co.; Groton Bridge Co.
- NRHP reference No.: 08000470
- Added to NRHP: May 29, 2008

Town Line Bridge, also known as Taylor Lenticular Truss Bridge, was a historic bridge located at Taylor in Cortland County, New York. It was constructed in 1888 by the Berlin Iron Bridge Company of East Berlin, Connecticut. It was an 85-foot-long single-span bridge and was built to serve wagon traffic.

The Groton Bridge Co. is also associated with the bridge.

It was listed on the National Register of Historic Places in 2008.

At the time of its NRHP listing, the bridge was believed to be one of only 13 lenticular truss bridges in New York State.

On August 24, 2018, demolition of Town Line Bridge began. By September 12, 2018, the bridge was completely torn down with no plan to replace. It is unknown who authorized the demolition as there is no documentation on the matter currently available other than a brief discussion during a Taylor town meeting held in April 2018.
