= Allenwood River Bridge =

- U.S. National Register of Historic Places
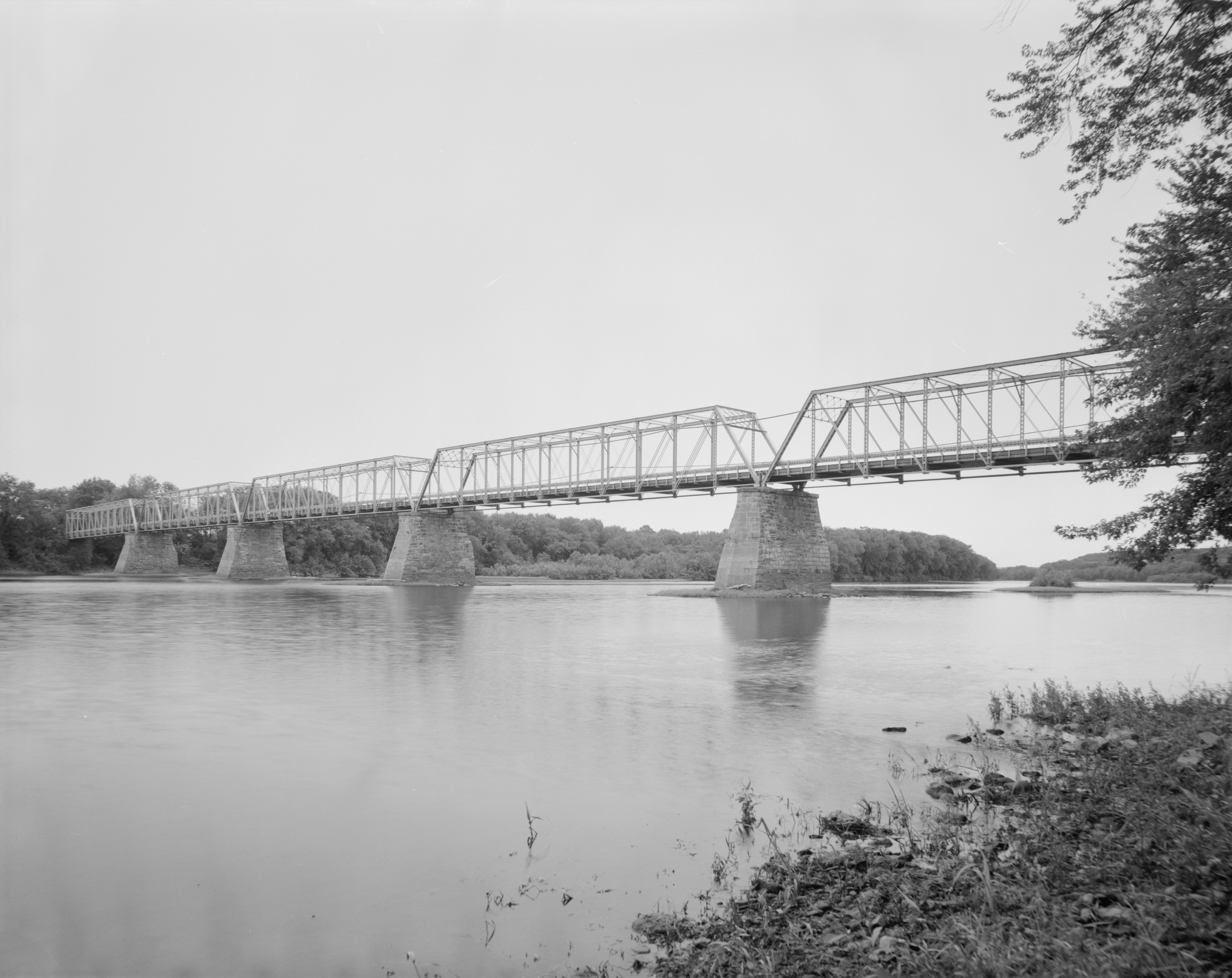
- Allenwood River Bridge, HABS Photo, 1988

- Location within Pennsylvania Location within the United States
- Location: PA 44 over W branch of Susquehanna River, Delaware Township and Gregg Township, Pennsylvania
- Coordinates: 41°6′28″N 76°53′25″W
- Area: 0.9 acres (0.36 ha)
- Built: 1895
- Architect: Groton Bridge & Manufacturing Co.
- Architectural style: Pratt through truss
- MPS: Highway Bridges Owned by the Commonwealth of Pennsylvania, Department of Transportation TR
- NRHP reference No.: 88000865
- Added to NRHP: June 22, 1988

The Allenwood River Bridge was a historic bridge in Delaware Township, Northumberland County, Pennsylvania, and Gregg Township, Union County, Pennsylvania. The two-lane, five-span, pin-connected Pratt through truss bridge carried Pennsylvania Route 44 over the West Branch Susquehanna River. The bridge was one of the oldest and longest spans crossing that river. Its builder, in 1895, was the Groton Bridge and Manufacturing Company, a nationally prominent bridge manufacturer from 1877 through 1920.

It was listed on the National Register of Historic Places in 1988. In 1990 it was replaced with a concrete bridge.

== Gallery ==
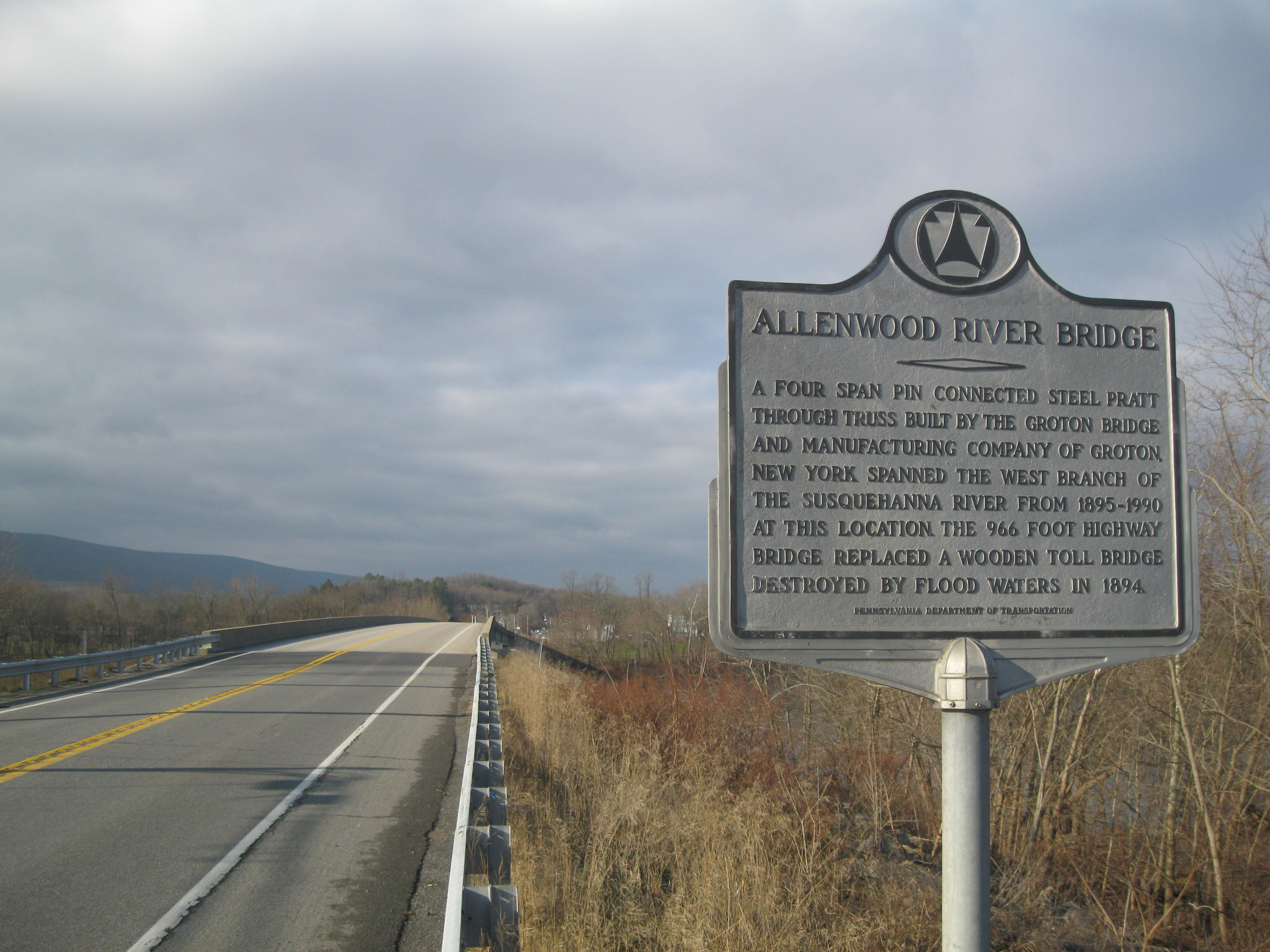
Historical marker near Dewart, with the replacement bridge behind

== See also ==
- List of bridges documented by the Historic American Engineering Record in Pennsylvania
