= Iron Bridge at Howard Hill Road =

- U.S. National Register of Historic Places
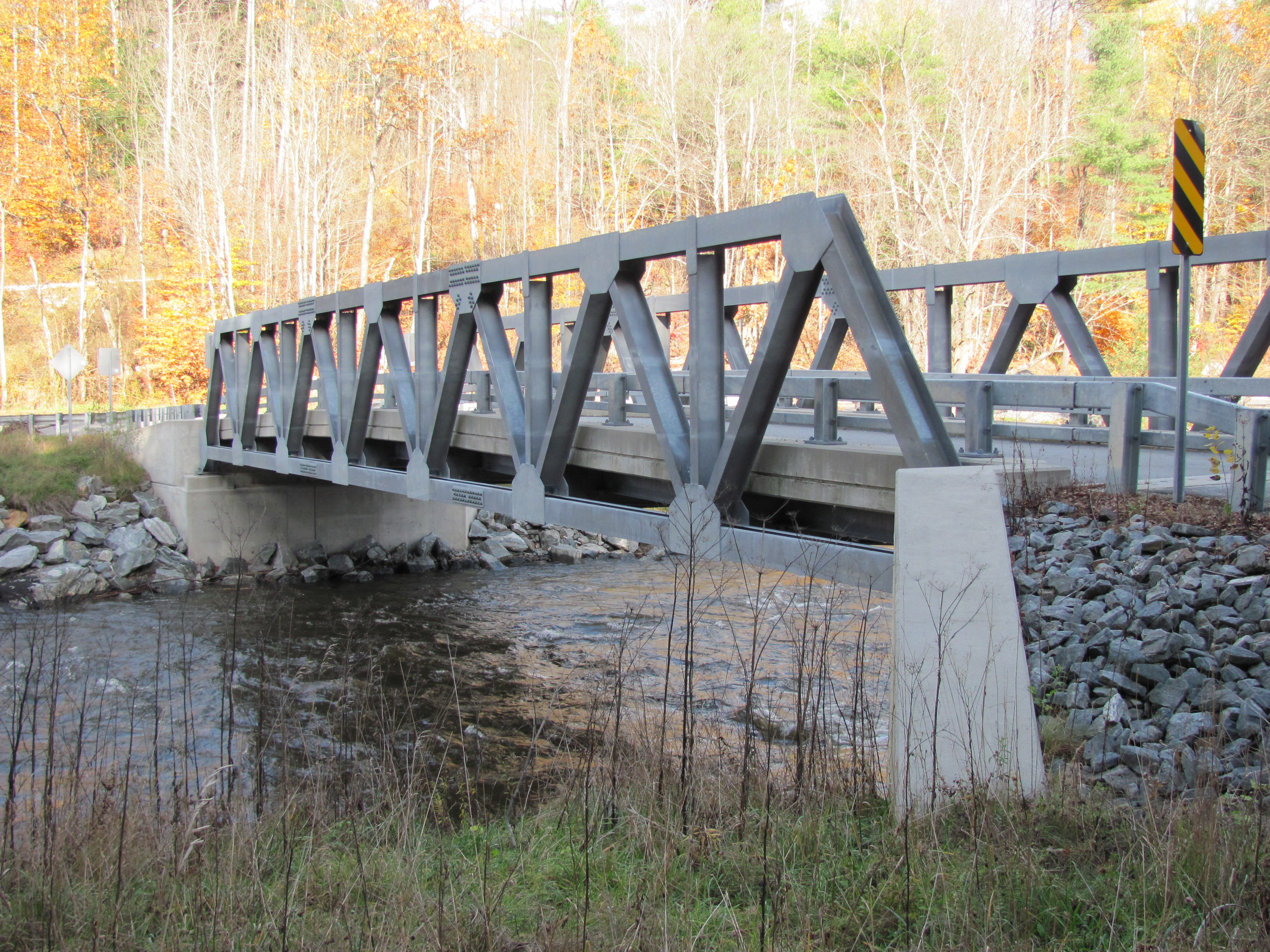

- Location within Vermont
- Location: Howard Hill Rd. and VT 131, Cavendish, Vermont
- Coordinates: 43°24′16″N 72°34′32″W
- Area: 0.3 acres (0.12 ha)
- Built: 1890
- Built by: Groton Bridge and Manufacturing Co.
- Architectural style: Pratt through truss
- NRHP reference No.: 82001711
- Added to NRHP: September 9, 1982

The Iron Bridge at Howard Hill Road is a modern pony truss bridge, carrying Howard Hill Road across the Black River in southeastern Cavendish, Vermont. It is the replacement for a historic 1890 Pratt through truss bridge, which is now in storage. The historic bridge was listed on the National Register of Historic Places in 1982.

== Modern bridge ==
The Howard Hill Road Bridge is located in southeastern Cavendish, just south of Vermont Route 131, which parallels the Black River on its northern bank. The river is at that point flowing roughly eastward, and the bridge is oriented north-south on modern concrete footings. The bridge is a low riveted pony truss structure, serving a few dead-end roads on the south side of the river.

== Historic bridge ==
The historic bridge, in storage as of 2012, was a single-span Pratt through truss built out of wrought and cast iron with elements connected by pins. The bridge was 88 feet (27 m) in length, with a roadway width of 14 feet (4.3 m) (one lane), and a portal height of 11.5 feet (3.5 m). It was set on uncoursed fieldstone abutments.

The bridge was built in 1890 by the Groton Bridge Co., and is one of a small number of 19th-century pin-connected truss bridges in the state. The bridge was dismantled in 2007, and is in storage held by the Historic Bridges Program of the state, which is seeking a suitable location to place it.

== See also ==
- National Register of Historic Places listings in Windsor County, Vermont
- List of bridges on the National Register of Historic Places in Vermont
