= Kingsley Township, Pennsylvania =

Township in Pennsylvania, United States

Coordinates: 41°29′30″N 79°27′29″W

Kingsley Township, Forest County, Pennsylvania
- Township
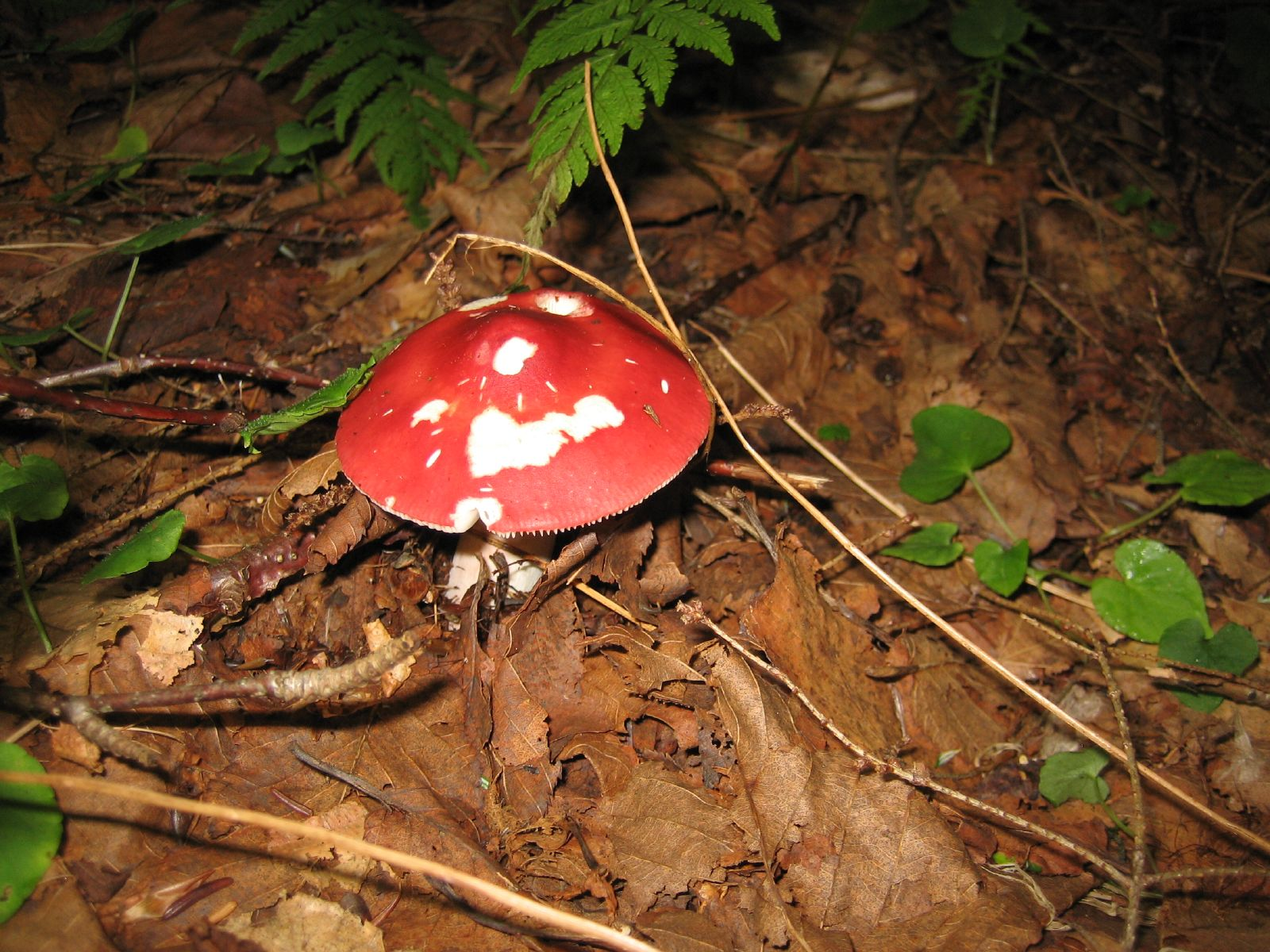
- Forest scene

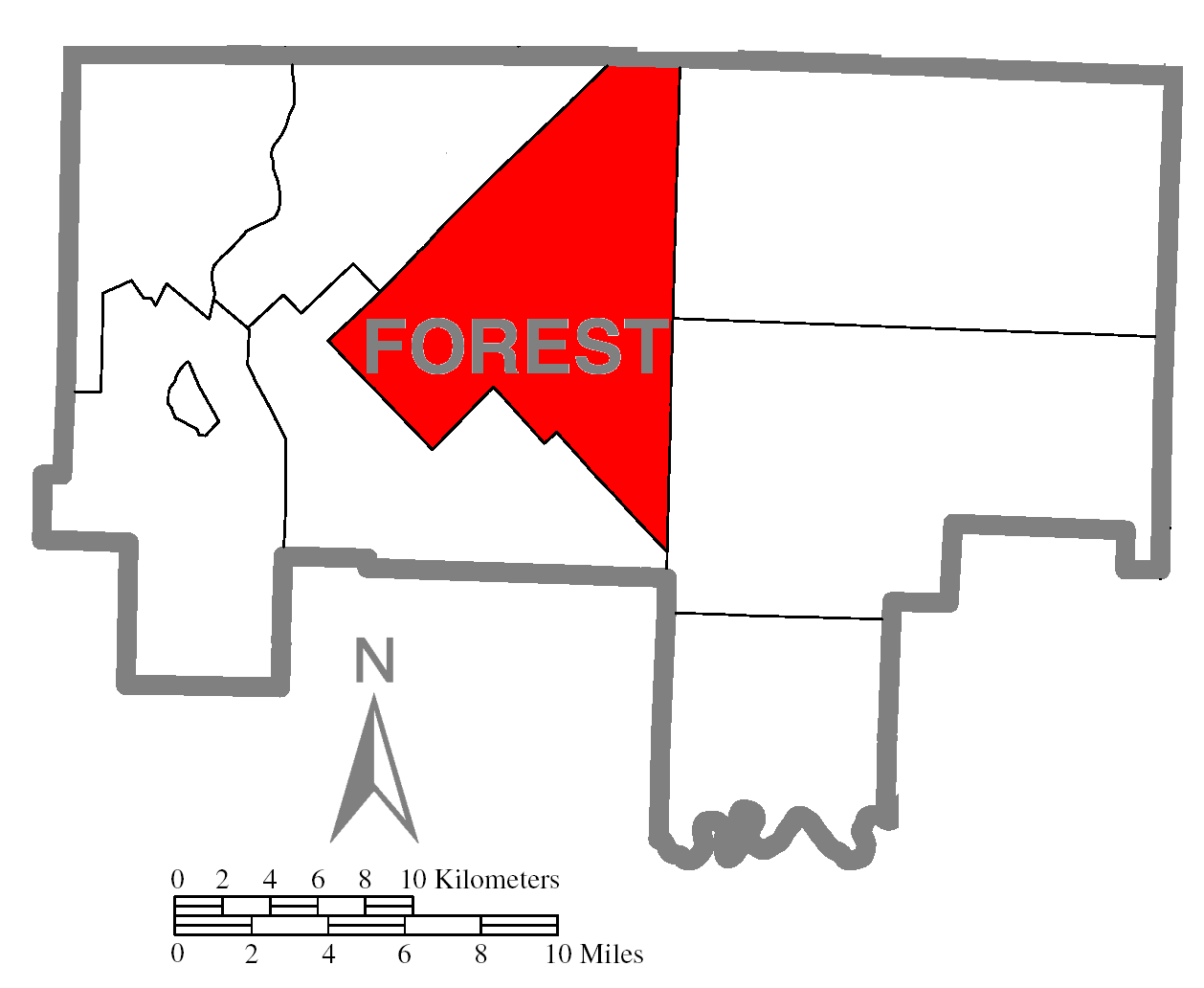
- Map of Forest County, Pennsylvania highlighting Kingsley Township

- Map of Forest County, Pennsylvania
- Country: United States
- State: Pennsylvania
- County: Forest
- Settled: 1860
- Incorporated: 1866

Government
  - Type: Board of Supervisors

Area
  - Total: 61.26 sq mi (158.65 km^{2})
  - Land: 60.83 sq mi (157.54 km^{2})
  - Water: 0.43 sq mi (1.11 km^{2})

Population (2020)
  - Total: 264
  - Estimate (2023): 257
  - Density: 4.34/sq mi (1.68/km^{2})
- Time zone: UTC-5 (Eastern (EST))
  - Summer (DST): UTC-4 (EDT)
- Area code: 814
- FIPS code: 42-053-39760

Kingsley Township is a township that is located in Forest County, Pennsylvania, United States. The population was 264 at the time of the 2020 census, which was a decrease from the total of 363 documented in 2010. The 2010 figure reflected an increase from the 261 residents counted during the 2000 census.

== Geography ==
The township is located in the center of Forest County, extending north to the Warren County line and reaching south to a point just north of the Clarion County line. Tionesta Creek, a tributary of the Allegheny River, crosses the township from northeast to southwest and is partially followed by Pennsylvania Route 666.

Unincorporated communities in the township include Mayburg, Whig Hill, Kellettville, Crystal Springs, and Starr.

According to the United States Census Bureau, the township has a total area of 61.3 square miles (158.7 km^{2}), of which 60.8 square miles (157.5 km^{2}) is land and 0.4 square miles (1.1 km^{2}), or 0.70%, is water.

== Demographics ==
Historical population
Census	Pop.	Note	%±
2000	261		—
2010	363		39.1%
2020	264		−27.3%
2023 (est.)	257		−2.7%

As of the census of 2000, there were 261 people, 119 households, and 79 families residing in the township.

The population density was 4.2 people per square mile (1.6/km^{2}). There were 1,294 housing units at an average density of 21.1/sq mi (8.1/km^{2}).

The racial makeup of the township was 97.32% White, 0.38% African American, 0.77% Native American, 0.38% from other races, and 1.15% from two or more races. Hispanic or Latino of any race were 0.77% of the population.

There were 119 households, out of which 21.8% had children under the age of eighteen living with them; 61.3% were married couples living together, 4.2% had a female householder with no husband present, and 32.8% were non-families. 29.4% of all households were made up of individuals, and 14.3% had someone living alone who was sixty-five years of age or older.

The average household size was 2.19 and the average family size was 2.70.

Within the township, the population was spread out, with 19.9% who were under the age of eighteen, 1.9% who were aged eighteen to twenty-four, 24.5% who were aged twenty-five to forty-four, 31.8% who were aged forty-five to sixty-four, and 21.8% who were sixty-five years of age or older. The median age was forty-eight years.

For every one hundred females, there were 110.5 males. For every one hundred females who were aged eighteen or older, there were 113.3 males.

The median income for a household in the township was $23,646, and the median income for a family was $24,167. Males had a median income of $31,563 compared with that of $18,333 for females.

The per capita income for the township was $12,307.

Approximately 9.4% of families and 14.2% of the population were living below the poverty line, including 28.6% of those who were under the age of eighteen and 2.5% of those who were aged sixty-five or older.
