= Groton Bridge Company =

American construction company

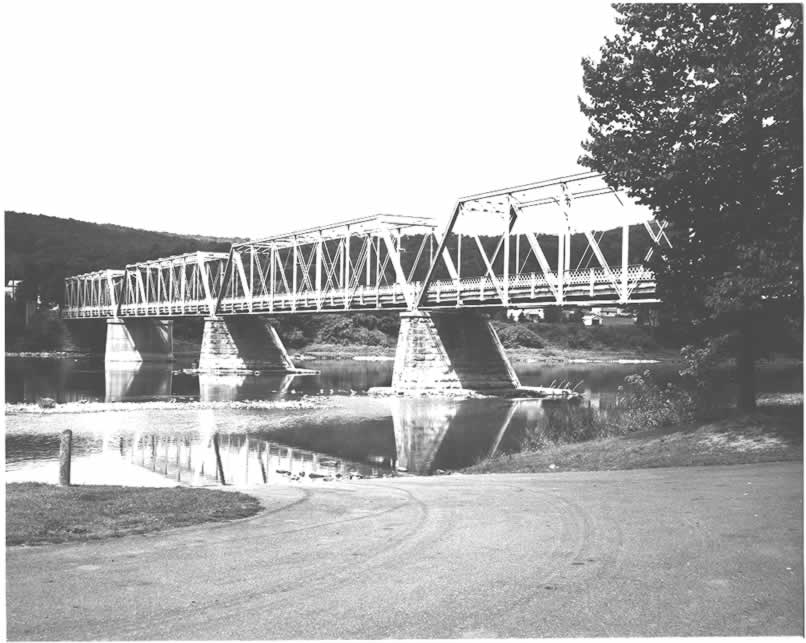
Old West Hickory Bridge, in 1982

The Groton Bridge Co. was an American construction company, based in Groton, New York.

== History ==
The company was founded in 1877 as Groton Iron Bridge Company, by merger of two firms. It was reorganized and became the Groton Bridge and Manufacturing Company in 1887. It was purchased by the American Bridge Company in 1899 but was separated in 1902 as Groton Bridge Co. and survived under that name until the 1920s.

The firm was believed to be a subsidiary of American Bridge Co. in 1908 when it installed two Parker truss spans manufactured by American Bridge Co. to complete the Plata Bridge in Puerto Rico.

== Notable projects ==
A number of its works are listed on the U.S. National Register of Historic Places.

- Cherokee Bridge, over Tennessee River, built for $69,000.
- Allenwood River Bridge, LR 460 over W branch of Susquehanna River, Allenwood, PA and Union, PA (Groton Bridge & Manufacturing Co.), NRHP-listed
- Blackford Bridge, Chestnut Rd (Rte 652), Lebanon, Virginia (Groton Bridge and Manufacturing Co), NRHP-listed
- Caneadea Bridge, Cty. Rd. over Genesee R., Caneadea, New York (Groton Iron Bridge Co.), NRHP-listed
- Goshen Land Company Bridge, built 1890, E of Goshen on VA 746, Goshen, Virginia (Groton Bridge Co.), NRHP-listed
- Iron Bridge at Howard Hill Road, Howard Hill Rd. and VT 131, Cavendish, Vermont (Groton Bridge and Manufacturing C), NRHP-listed
- Meadow Bridge, spur of North Rd. in Ahelburne across the Androscoggin R., Shelburne, New Hampshire (Groton Bridge and Manufacturing Co.), NRHP-listed
- New Sharon Bridge, S of ME 2 over Sandy River, New Sharon, Maine (Groton Bridge Co.), NRHP-listed
- Plata Bridge, near Naranjito, Puerto Rico, (Groton Bridge Co.), NRHP-listed
- Rorig Bridge, Water St. at Chautauqua Creek, Westfield, New York (Groton Bridge Co.), NRHP-listed
- Town Line Bridge, Town Line Rd., Taylor, New York (Groton Bridge Co.), NRHP-listed
- West Hickory Bridge, LR 598 over Allegheny River, West Hickory, Pennsylvania (Groton Bridge Co.), NRHP-listed
- West Woodstock Bridge, Town Hwy. 50 over the Ottauquechee R., West Woodstock, Vermont (Groton Bridge & Manufacturing Co.), NRHP-listed
