= Hickory Township, Forest County, Pennsylvania =

Township in Pennsylvania, United States

Coordinates: 41°37′31″N 79°22′59″W

- Township
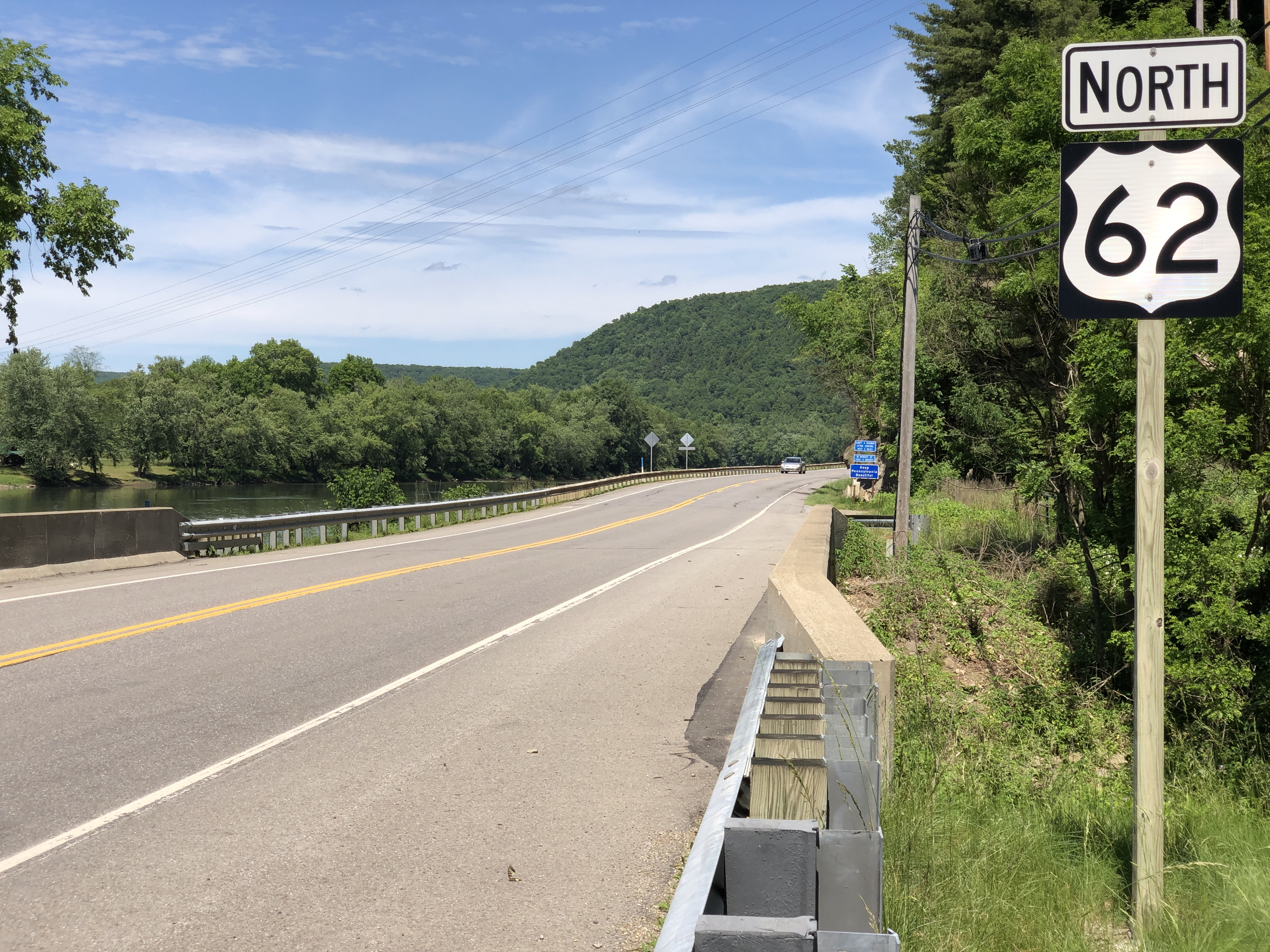
- US 62 in Hickory Township

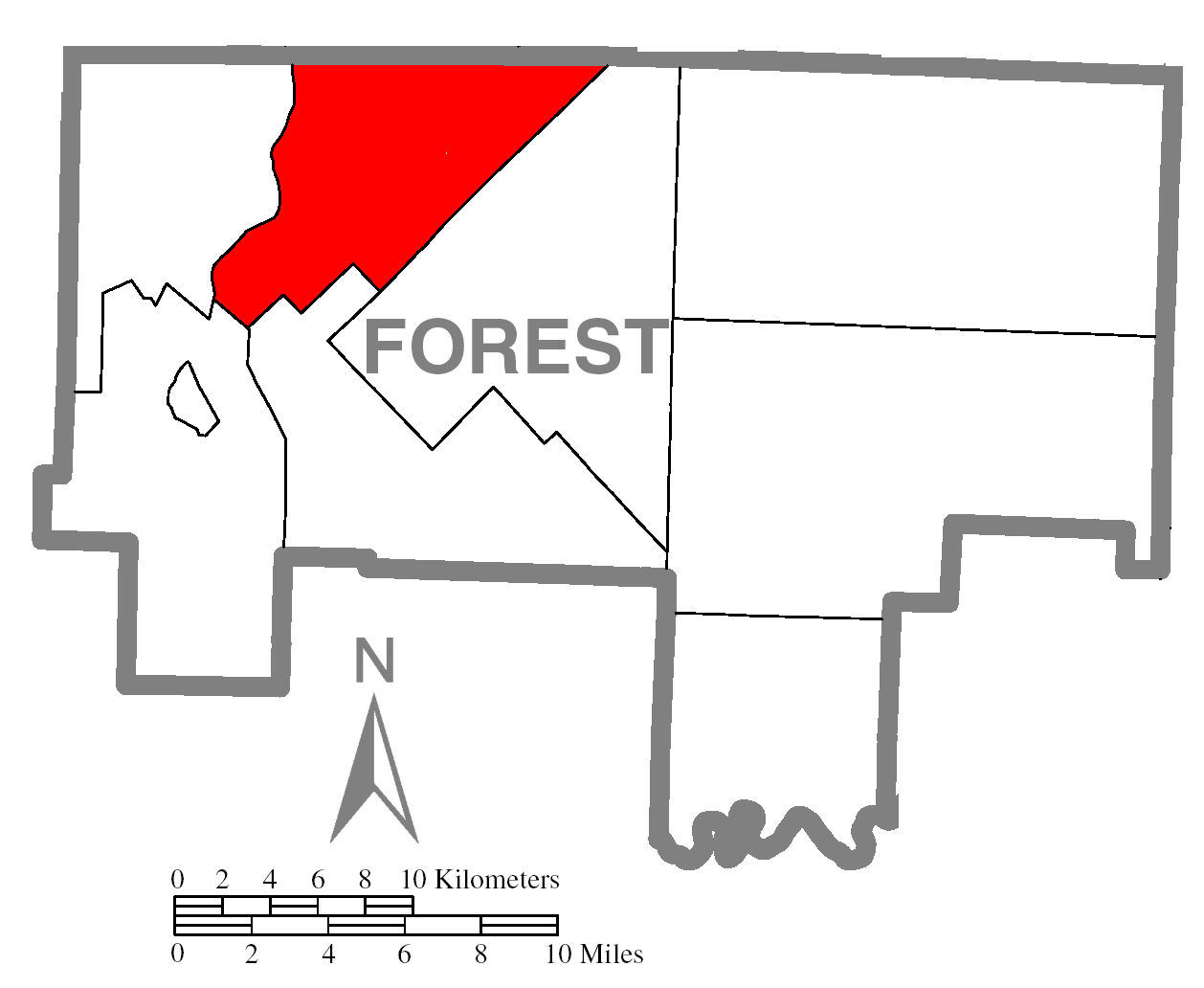
- Map of Forest County, Pennsylvania highlighting Hickory Township

- Map of Forest County, Pennsylvania
- Country: United States
- State: Pennsylvania
- County: Forest
- Incorporated: 1866

Government
  - Type: Board of Supervisors

Area
  - Total: 38.02 sq mi (98.47 km^{2})
  - Land: 37.60 sq mi (97.38 km^{2})
  - Water: 0.42 sq mi (1.09 km^{2})

Population (2020)
  - Total: 416
  - Estimate (2023): 401
  - Density: 11.1/sq mi (4.27/km^{2})
- Time zone: UTC-5 (Eastern (EST))
  - Summer (DST): UTC-4 (EDT)
- Area code: 814
- FIPS code: 42-053-34240

Hickory Township is a township in Forest County, Pennsylvania, United States. As of the 2020 census, the township population was 416, a decline from 558 in 2010.

== History ==
The West Hickory Bridge was listed on the National Register of Historic Places in 1988.

== Geography ==
Hickory Township is located in northwestern Forest County, and is bordered to the north by Warren County. The Allegheny River forms the western boundary of the township. U.S. Route 62 follows the east side of the river through the township, leading north to Warren and south to Tionesta. Pennsylvania Route 666 crosses the township from US-62 at East Hickory in the west to Kellettville in neighboring Kingsley Township.

In addition to East Hickory, unincorporated places in Hickory Township include Queen, Endeavor, Church Hill, and Little Hickory.

According to the United States Census Bureau, Hickory Township has a total area of 38.0 square miles (98.5 km^{2}), of which 37.6 square miles (97.4 km^{2}) is land and 0.42 square miles (1.1 km^{2}), or 1.11%, is water.

== Demographics ==
Historical population
Census	Pop.	Note	%±
2000	525		—
2010	558		6.3%
2020	416		−25.4%
2023 (est.)	401		−3.6%

As of the census of 2000, there were 525 people, 226 households, and 150 families residing in the township.

The population density was 14.0 people per square mile (5.4/km^{2}). There were 1,017 housing units at an average density of 27.1 per square mile (10.5/km^{2}).

The racial makeup of the township was 98.10% White, 0.19% African American, 0.76% Native American, 0.38% Asian, and 0.57% from two or more races.

There were 226 households, out of which 25.7% had children under the age of eighteen living with them; 53.5% were married couples living together, 6.6% had a female householder with no husband present, and 33.2% were non-families. 26.1% of all households were made up of individuals, and 12.4% had someone living alone who was sixty-five years of age or older.

The average household size was 2.32 and the average family size was 2.82.

In the township the population was spread out, with 20.2% under the age of eighteen, 5.0% from eighteen to twenty-four, 27.2% from twenty-five to forty-four, 29.1% from forty-five to sixty-four, and 18.5% who were sixty-five years of age or older. The median age was forty-four years.

For every one hundred females, there were 105.1 males. For every one hundred females who were aged eighteen or older, there were 105.4 males.

The median income for a household in the township was $28,750, and the median income for a family was $36,964. Males had a median income of $27,361 compared with that of $17,500 for females.

The per capita income for the township was $15,856.

Roughly 7.5% of families and 9.6% of the population were living below the poverty line, including 9.0% of those who were under the age of eighteen and 16.5% of those who were aged sixty-five or older.
