= Porkey, Pennsylvania =

Unincorporated community in Pennsylvania, US

- Unincorporated community
- Location within Pennsylvania Location within the United States
- Coordinates: 41°36′43″N 79°09′56″W
- Country: United States
- State: Pennsylvania
- County: Forest
- Township: Howe
- Elevation: 1,207 ft (368 m)
- Time zone: UTC-5 (Eastern (EST))
  - Summer (DST): UTC-4 (EDT)
- GNIS feature ID: 1209901

Porkey is an unincorporated community in Howe Township, Forest County, Pennsylvania, United States.

The settlement is located within the Allegheny National Forest along Pennsylvania Route 666, next to Tionesta Creek.

== History ==
The early settlement contained three lumber mills and was described as "a small but active little town".

Porkey was a stop on the Sheffield and Tionesta Railway, a now-abandoned 40-mile-long (64 km) railway that began operating in 1900.

A wagon bridge was built across Tionesta Creek at Porkey in 1918.
