= Meadow Bridge (Shelburne, New Hampshire) =

- U.S. National Register of Historic Places
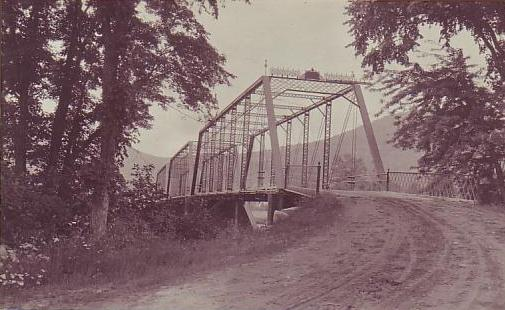
- The bridge c. 1920

- Location within New Hampshire Location within the United States
- Location: Spur of North Rd. in Shelburne across the Androscoggin R., Shelburne, New Hampshire
- Coordinates: 44°24′17″N 71°4′3″W
- Area: less than one acre
- Built: 1897
- Architect: Groton Bridge and Manufacturing Co.
- Architectural style: Multiple Steel Truss
- NRHP reference No.: 03001284
- Added to NRHP: December 10, 2003

The Meadow Bridge was a historic bridge across the Androscoggin River located on a spur of North Road in Shelburne, New Hampshire. It was a multi-span pin-connected truss bridge that was the first on its site when it was built in 1897 by the Groton Bridge and Manufacturing Co. The bridge consisted of three central through Pratt trusses, one pony Pratt truss, and one steel girder section. The ends of the bridge rested on stone abutments, while the interior spans were supported by circular steel piers filled with concrete and anchored in place by timber piles. The bridge was bypassed in 1984 by a modern bridge. In 2004 it was dismantled and stored on the banks of the river for future rehabilitation.

The bridge's total length was about 504 feet (154 m), and it was just over 18 feet (5.5 m) wide. Its three central spans were identical Pratt trusses, 133'4" long and 20' tall. The pony truss connected the main span to the southwestern shore, and measured 73'10". It was inclined at a 3% grade. The northern approach was a steel span with stringers 24' long over a 21'3" span. This approach was inclined at a 2% grade.

When the bridge was built, the river normally meandered in a channel that could be as wide as 400 feet. Silting and gravel deposits over time have altered the river's course, and it now is rarely wider than 250 feet. The main course of the river has been shifted northward, and the northernmost pier had been shored up to prevent it from being undermined. The bridge was one of the longest bridges of its type built in the state.

The bridge was listed on the National Register of Historic Places in 2003.

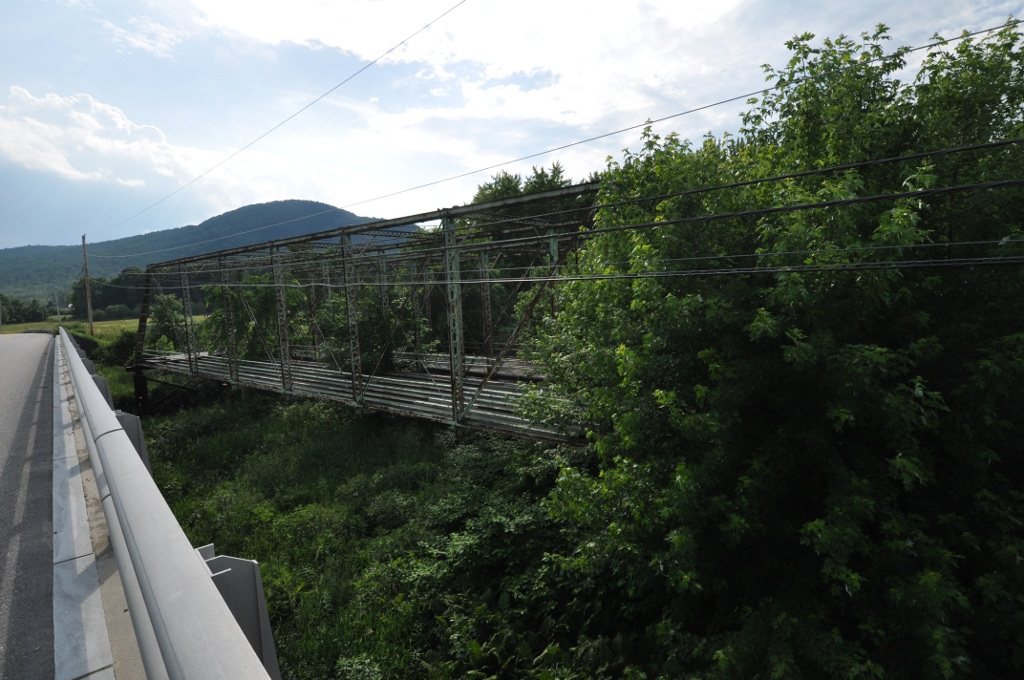
Trusses lying on the south side of the river

== See also ==
- National Register of Historic Places listings in Coos County, New Hampshire
- List of bridges on the National Register of Historic Places in New Hampshire
