= Howe Township, Forest County, Pennsylvania =

Township in Pennsylvania, United States

Coordinates: 41°35′00″N 79°03′59″W

- Township
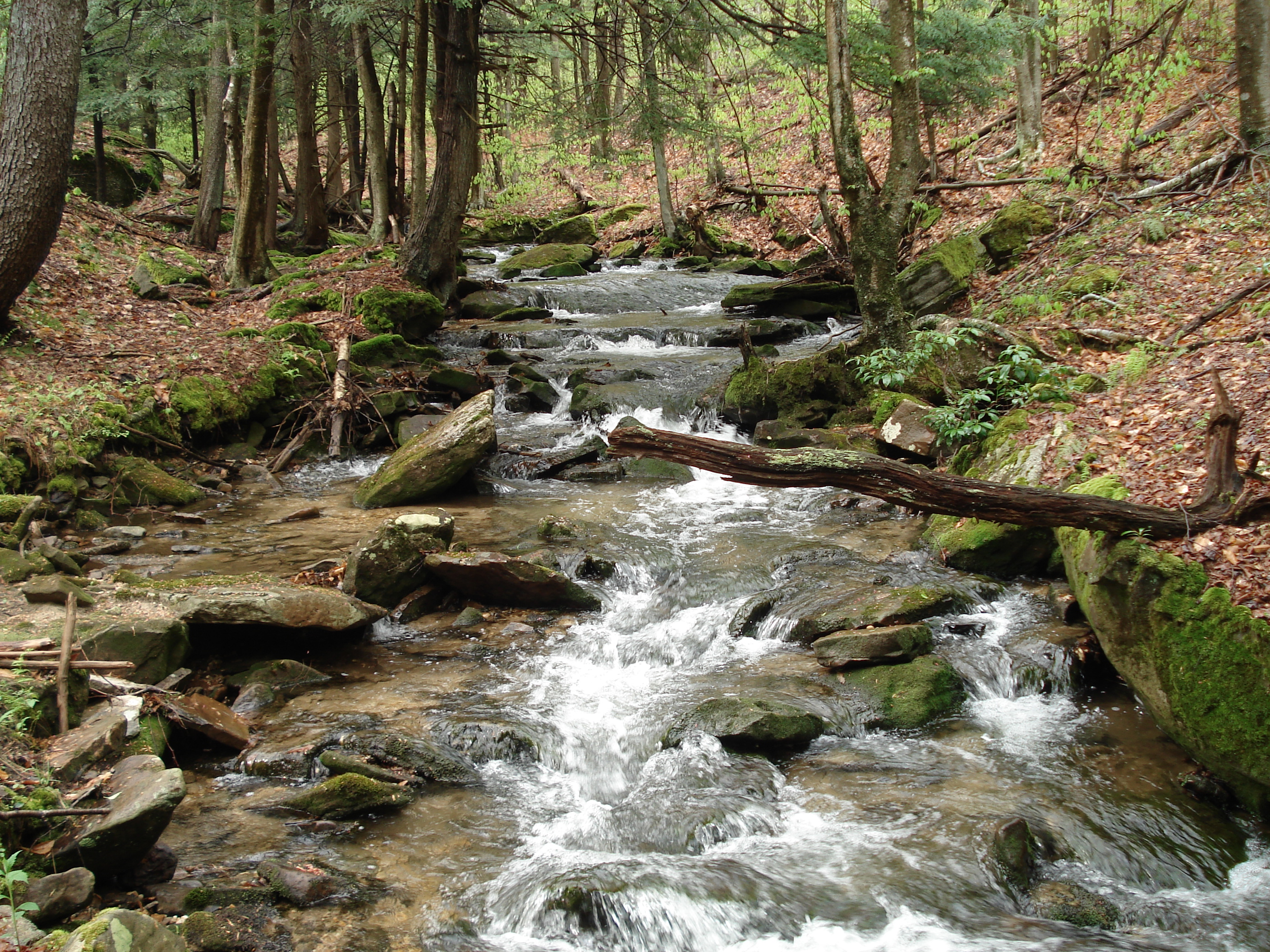
- Minister Creek passes through the Allegheny National Forest in Howe Township

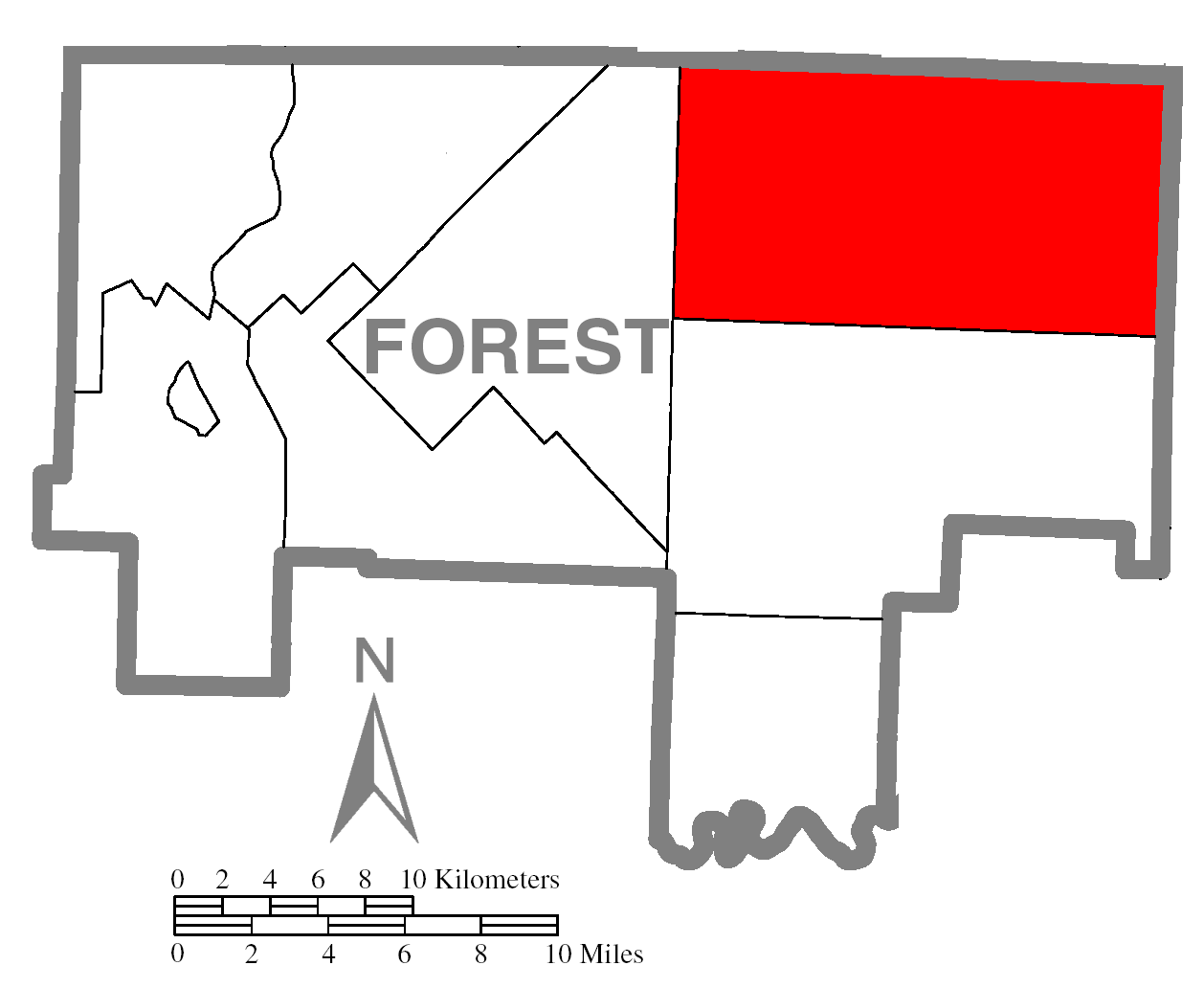
- Map of Forest County, Pennsylvania highlighting Howe Township

- Map of Forest County, Pennsylvania
- Country: United States
- State: Pennsylvania
- County: Forest
- Incorporated: 1867

Government
  - Type: Board of Supervisors

Area
  - Total: 87.51 sq mi (226.65 km^{2})
  - Land: 87.51 sq mi (226.65 km^{2})
  - Water: 0 sq mi (0.00 km^{2})

Population (2020)
  - Total: 201
  - Estimate (2023): 197
  - Density: 2.30/sq mi (0.887/km^{2})
- Time zone: UTC-5 (Eastern (EST))
  - Summer (DST): UTC-4 (EDT)
- Area code: 814
- FIPS code: 42-053-35992
- Website: howetwp.org

Howe Township is a township in Forest County, Pennsylvania, United States. The population was 201 at the 2020 census, down from 405 in 2010.

== Geography ==
The township occupies the northeastern corner of Forest County. It is bordered to the north by Warren County, to the east by Elk County, and at its northeast corner by McKean County. Tionesta Creek, a westward-flowing tributary of the Allegheny River, crosses the northern part of the township. Pennsylvania Route 666 follows the creek through the township, passing the unincorporated communities of Mayburg, Balltown, Porkey, Minister, Truemans, and Lynch. Pennsylvania Route 948 crosses the northeastern corner of the township, following the South Branch of Tionesta Creek and passing through the unincorporated community of Brookston. Pennsylvania Route 66 crosses the southeastern part of the township, passing through the settlement known as Pigeon near the southern border.

According to the United States Census Bureau, the township has a total area of 87.5 square miles (226.6 km^{2}), all land.

== Population ==
Historical population
Census	Pop.	Note	%±
2000	417		—
2010	405		−2.9%
2020	201		−50.4%
2023 (est.)	197		−2.0%

Howe Township houses the Cornell Abraxas juvenile detention facility, a 274-bed long-term correctional institution for substance abusers. Because the residents of this facility are counted as Howe Township residents by the U.S. Census Bureau, most statistics about the township are heavily skewed and not representative of the non-institutionalized population. Of the 405 people in the township at the 2010 census, 227 were between the ages of 15 and 19.

Thus, Howe Township variously arises on lists that rank Pennsylvania's municipalities by characteristics (income, demographics, etc.) as the "most" or "least" in a category. For instance, according to raw census data, Howe Township is both the state's poorest municipality when judged by per capita income and one of the youngest, with a median age of 18.6.

== Demographics ==
As of the census of 2000, there were 417 people, 68 households, and 36 families residing in the township. The population density was 4.7 people per square mile (1.8/km^{2}). There were 677 housing units at an average density of 7.7/sq mi (3.0/km^{2}). The racial makeup of the township was 65.71% White, 24.46% African American, 0.72% Native American, 0.72% Asian, 7.91% from other races, and 0.48% from two or more races. Hispanic or Latino of any race were 10.07% of the population.

There were 68 households, out of which 19.1% had children under the age of 18 living with them, 42.6% were married couples living together, 5.9% had a female householder with no husband present, and 45.6% were non-families. 32.4% of all households were made up of individuals, and 14.7% had someone living alone who was 65 years of age or older. The average household size was 2.07 and the average family size was 2.65.

In the township the population was spread out, with 53.2% under the age of 18, 18.9% from 18 to 24, 7.2% from 25 to 44, 14.9% from 45 to 64, and 5.8% who were 65 years of age or older. The median age was 18 years. For every 100 females, there were 504.3 males. For every 100 females age 18 and over, there were 242.1 males.

The median income for a household in the township was $25,972, and the median income for a family was $25,625. Males had a median income of $26,250 versus $13,750 for females. The per capita income for the township was $5,223. None of the families and 63.3% of the population were living below the poverty line, including none under 18 and none of those over 64.
