= Harmony Township, Forest County, Pennsylvania =

Township in Pennsylvania, United States

Coordinates: 41°35′00″N 79°30′59″W

- Township
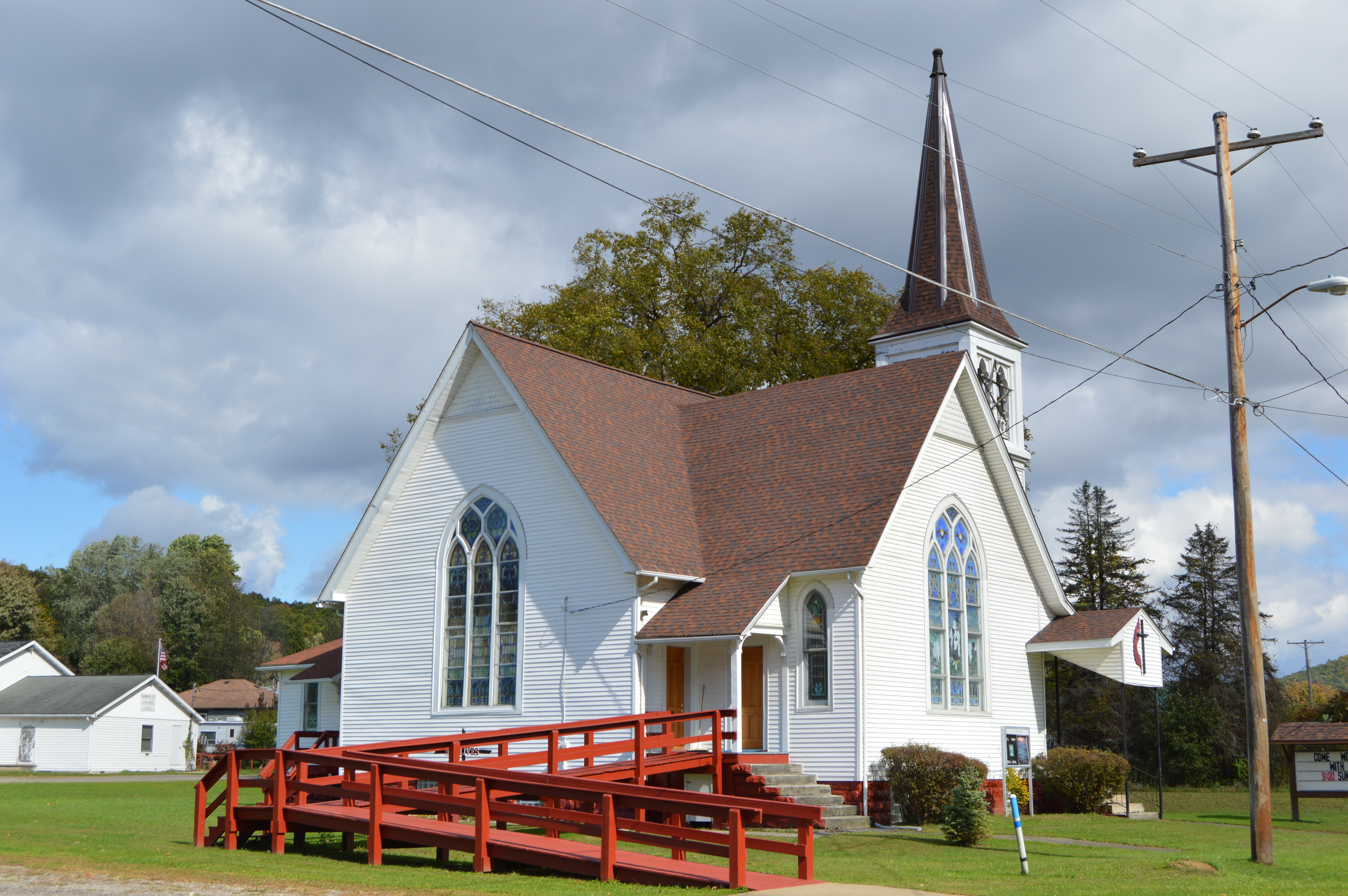
- Methodist church in West Hickory

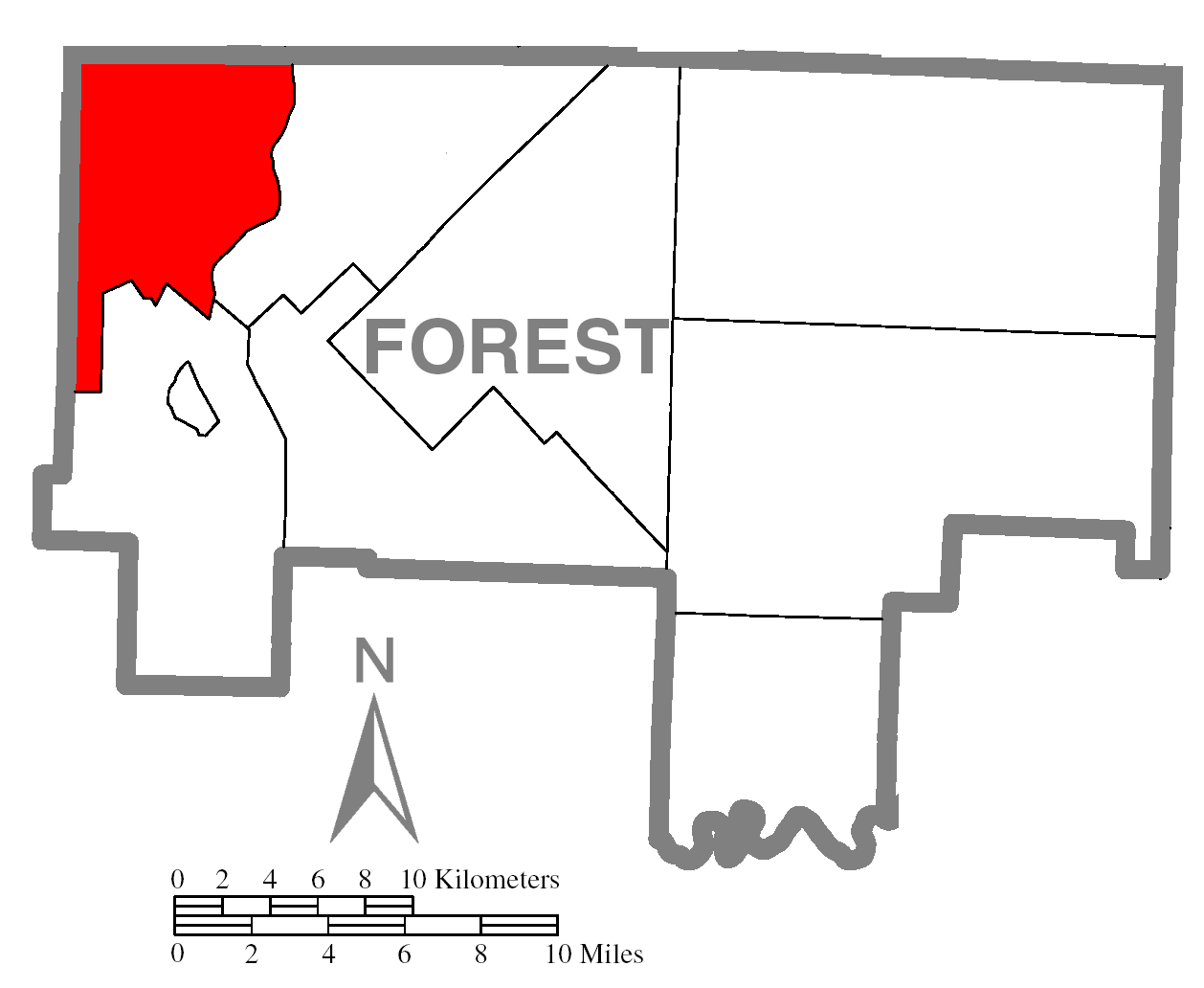
- Map of Forest County, Pennsylvania highlighting Harmony Township

- Map of Forest County, Pennsylvania
- Country: United States
- State: Pennsylvania
- County: Forest
- Settled: 1855
- Incorporated: 1866

Government
  - Type: Board of Supervisors
  - Chairman: Frank L. Donato
  - Vice-chairman: Derrick D. Beach
  - Roadmaster: William R. Hall

Area
  - Total: 34.51 sq mi (89.38 km^{2})
  - Land: 34.07 sq mi (88.24 km^{2})
  - Water: 0.44 sq mi (1.14 km^{2})

Population (2020)
  - Total: 466
  - Estimate (2023): 449
  - Density: 13.7/sq mi (5.28/km^{2})
- Time zone: UTC-5 (Eastern (EST))
  - Summer (DST): UTC-4 (EDT)
- Area code: 814
- FIPS code: 42-053-32704
- Website: www.harmony-township.org

Harmony Township is a township in Forest County, Pennsylvania, United States. The population was 466 at the 2020 census, down from 666 in 2010, a figure which was, in turn, an increase from 511 as of the 2000 census.

== History ==
The West Hickory Bridge was listed on the National Register of Historic Places in 1988.

== Geography ==
Harmony Township occupies the northwestern corner of Forest County; it is bordered to the north by Warren County and to the west by Venango County. The Allegheny River forms the eastern boundary of the township. (It is the only township in Forest County that is entirely west of the river.) The unincorporated communities of West Hickory, Neilltown, Trunkeyville, and Stewart Run are in the township.

According to the United States Census Bureau, the township has a total area of 34.5 square miles (89.4 km^{2}), of which 34.1 square miles (88.2 km^{2}) is land and 0.42 square miles (1.1 km^{2}), or 1.27%, is water.

== Demographics ==
Historical population
Census	Pop.	Note	%±
2000	511		—
2010	666		30.3%
2020	466		−30.0%
2023 (est.)	449		−3.6%

As of the census of 2000, there were 511 people, 217 households, and 144 families residing in the township. The population density was 15.0 people per square mile (5.8/km^{2}). There were 892 housing units at an average density of 26.1 per square mile (10.1/km^{2}). The racial makeup of the township was 98.63% White, 0.59% Native American, and 0.78% from two or more races. Hispanic or Latino of any race were 0.20% of the population.

There were 217 households, out of which 20.3% hid children under the age of 18 living with them, 52.5% were married couples living together, 8.3% had a female householder with no husband present, and 33.2% were non-families. 27.6% of all households were made up of individuals, and 13.8% had someone living alone who was 65 years of age or older. The average household size was 2.35 and the average family size was 2.83.

In the township the population was spread out, with 18.8% under the age of 18, 6.7% from 18 to 24, 22.9% from 25 to 44, 30.7% from 45 to 64, and 20.9% who were 65 years of age or older. The median age was 46 years. For every 100 females, there were 109.4 males. For every 100 females age 18 and over, there were 109.6 males.

The median income for a household in the township was $24,861, and the median income for a family was $28,500. Males had a median income of $23,036 versus $19,231 for females. The per capita income for the township was $11,831. About 15.4% of families and 17.8% of the population were below the poverty line, including 19.8% of those under age 18 and 16.1% of those age 65 or over.
