= Pennsylvania Route 666 =

State highway in Forest and Warren counties in Pennsylvania, United States

Pennsylvania Route 666

Route information
- Maintained by PennDOT
- Length: 33.6 mi (54.1 km)
- Existed: 1928–present

Major junctions
- West end: US 62 in Hickory Township
- East end: US 6 in Sheffield

Location
- Country: United States
- State: Pennsylvania
- Counties: Forest, Warren

Highway system
- Pennsylvania State Route System; Interstate; US; State; Scenic; Legislative
← PA 664	→ PA 669

Pennsylvania Route 666 (PA 666) is an east–west state route located in northwest Pennsylvania. The western terminus of the route is at U.S. Route 62 (US 62) in the Hickory Township municipality of East Hickory, and its eastern terminus is at US 6 in the hamlet of Sheffield. Most of its route is within Allegheny National Forest, and therefore it is sparsely populated, with the largest settlement along the road being Endeavor. Its official name is the David Zeisberger Memorial Highway.

The route was assigned in the 1928 numbering of State Routes in Pennsylvania. The highway originally ended in the town of Nebraska until being extended southward along other streets. The route was realigned in 1946 onto its present routing. The highway has remained the same since.

== Route description ==
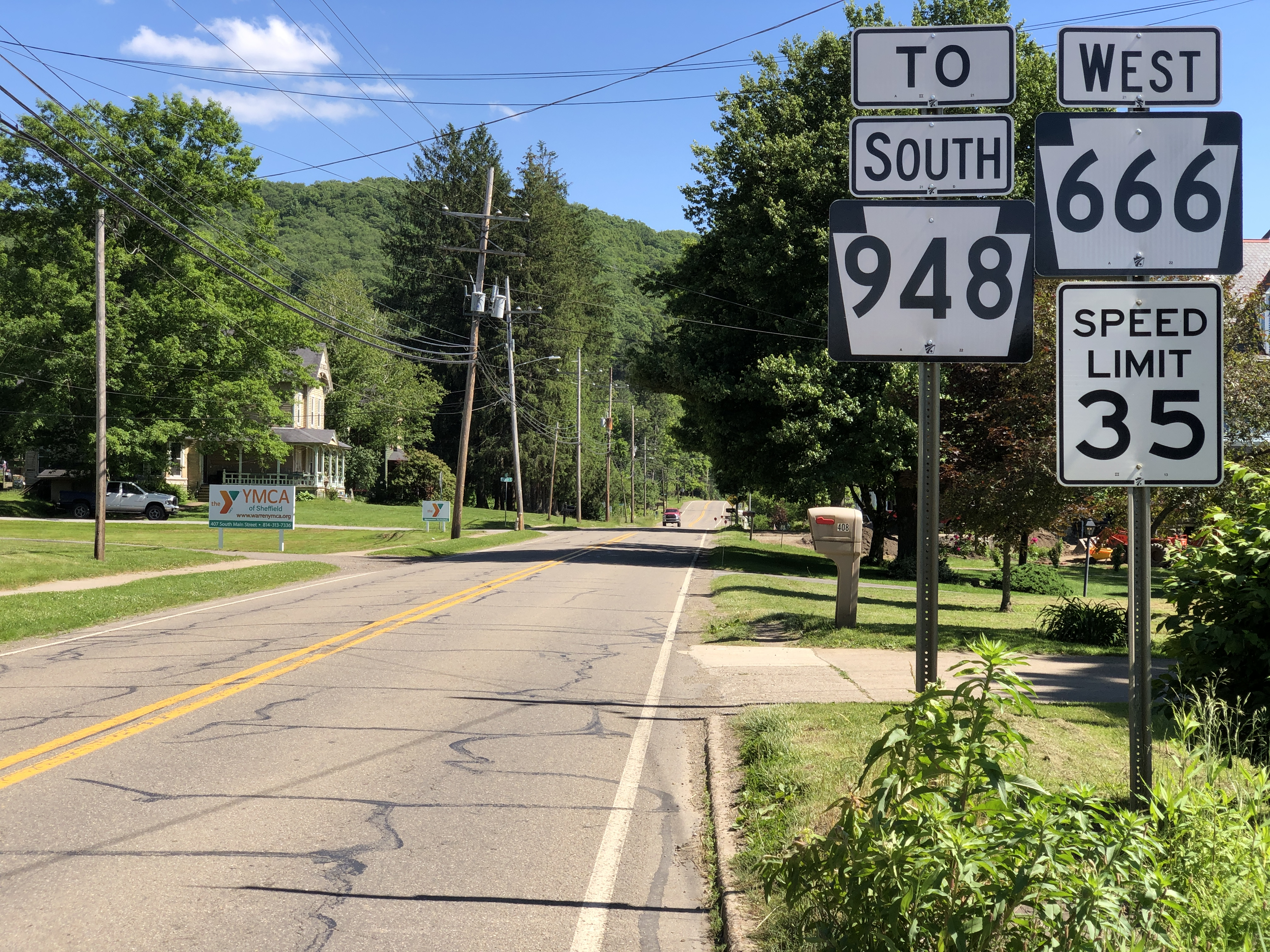
PA 666 westbound in Sheffield

=== East Hickory to Old PA 666 ===
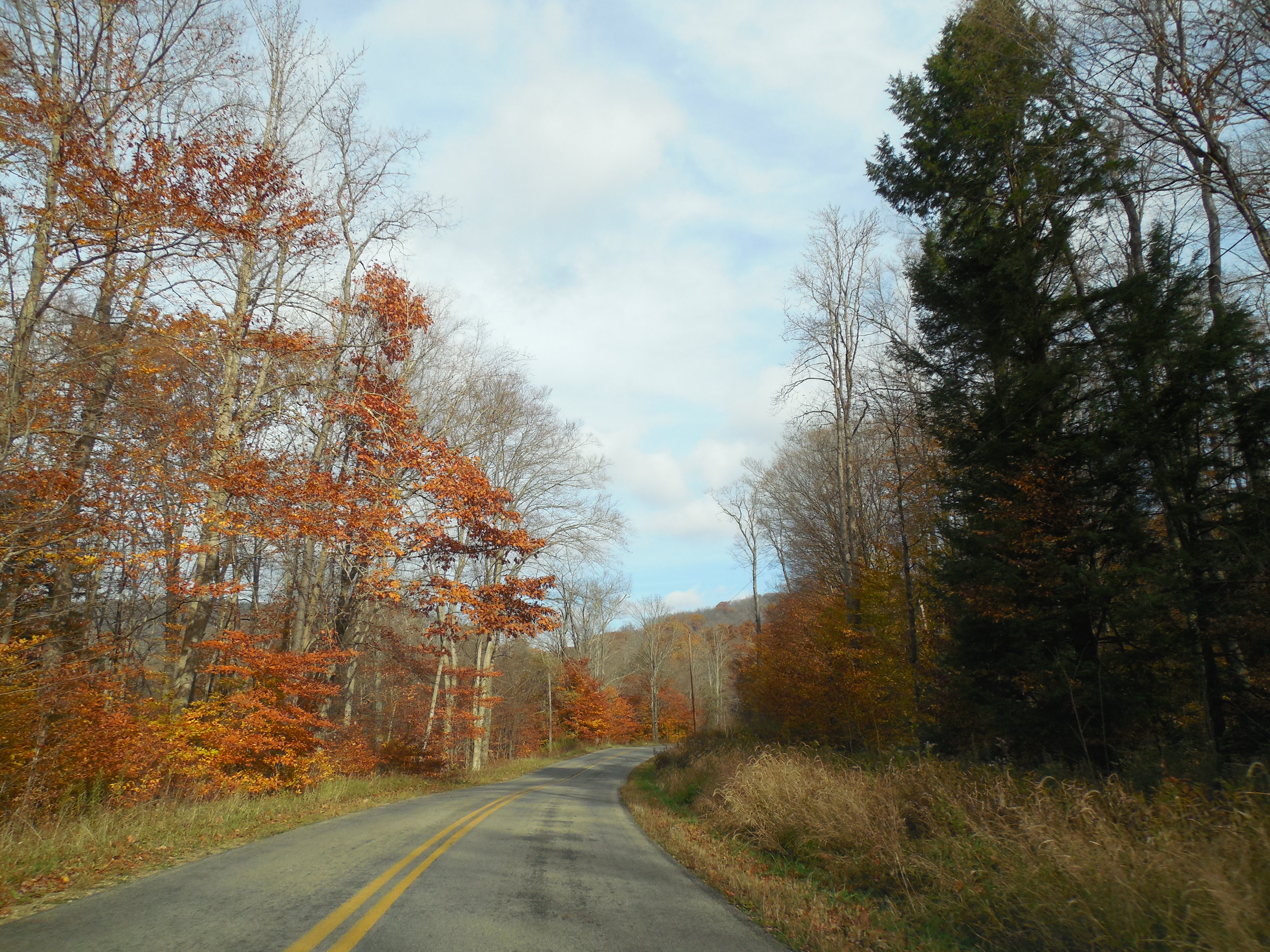
PA 666 in Hickory Township

PA 666 begins at an intersection with US 62 along the banks of the Allegheny River in East Hickory. The route progresses eastward, intersecting with East Hickory Road, a dead end street that is part of old US 62. With trees and some homes surrounding the highway, PA 666 continues out of East Hickory and into Hickory Township. The highway heads into Queen, intersecting with two dead-end streets before turning to the southeast. The route quickly leaves Queen, entering a heavily forested area. The trees around the highway are very dense and surround the highway for several miles. The southeastern motion that PA 666 was following becomes a steady east, with the highway making several changes in its direction. There is an intersection with a local road, Yellow Hammer Road, which has access to a small amount of civilization. The road however, is a loop, and merges in soon after. The route continues farther through the dense forestry, intersecting with a woods road. PA 666 continues farther to the southeast, entering a break in the dense forestry.

The break in forestry is short, and PA 666 continues, now fully to the south. There is another break as the highway approaches the intersection of Balltown Road and Dutch Hill Road. Hazelton Hill Road parallels to the south along the eastern-direction highway and both turn southward soon afterward. When PA 666 turns back into the heavily forested area, Hazleton Hill Road turns in the other direction and the parallel ends. There is a small break in the forestry, for some homes, and the highway then begins to make its loop to the north. Paralleling the Tionesta Creek PA 666 intersects with some local roads, Pierson Hill and Salmon Creek Roads. After the bend in Kettlettville, PA 666 follows a short segment of an old alignment, deemed on maps as Old PA-666. PA 666 now makes a steady path to the northeast along the creekbanks, and the dense forests return. The northeastern progression begins to change, and the highway begins a more northward direction. Continuing through the forestry, PA 666 begins to change to a more eastern direction, and in the process, leaving the creekbanks.

=== Old PA 666 to Sheffield ===
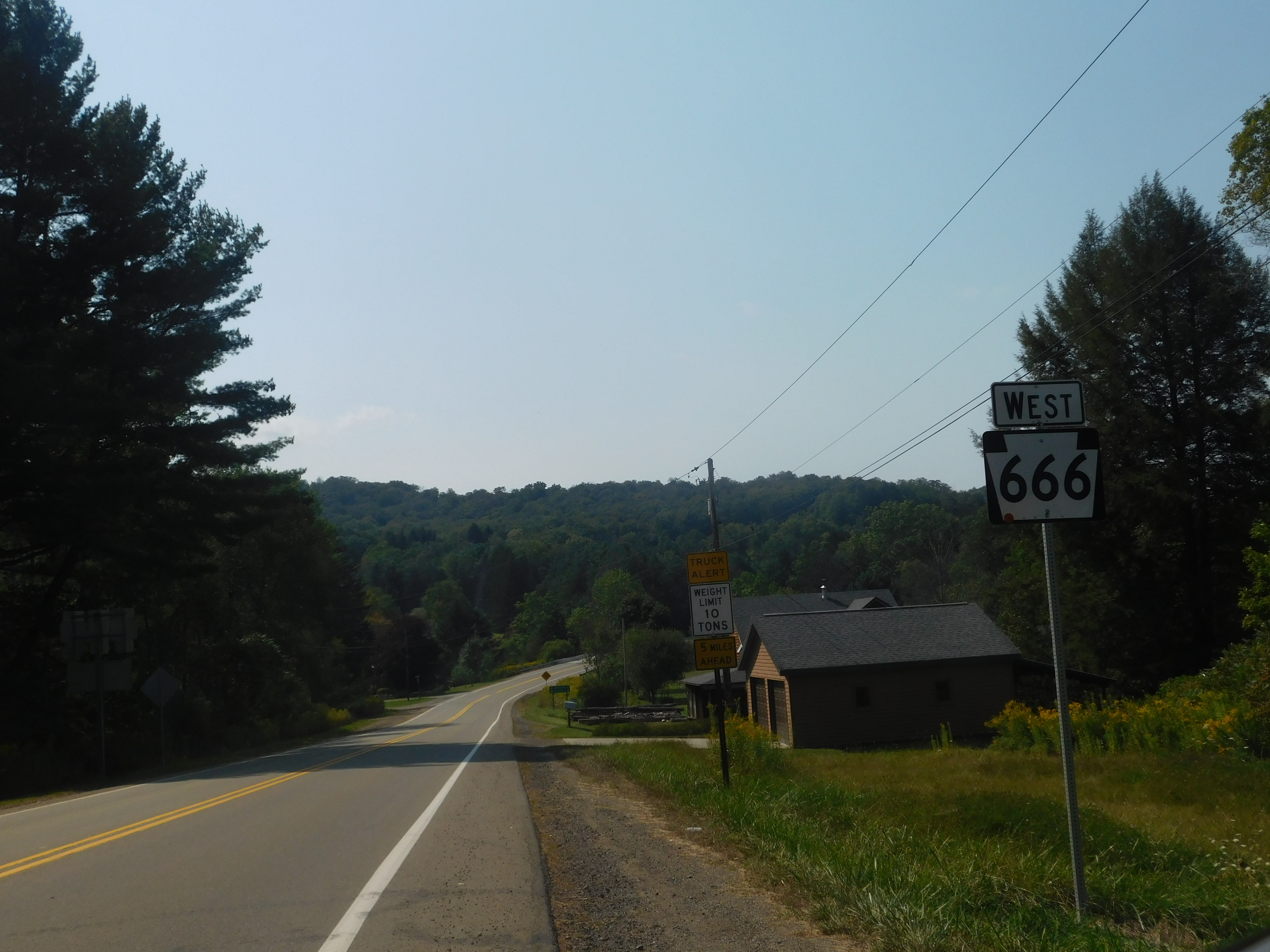
PA 666 in Barnes

The eastern progression begins to convert to another northeastern one, eventually moving into Balltown. In Balltown, there is a break in the forestry for a small area of civilization. The route heads northward, running along the riverbanks once again, and enters the small municipality of Porkey, Pennsylvania. PA 666 leaves Porkey and makes a U-shaped turn through the forestry. In the U is the municipality of Minister. Afterwards, the route's progression is mainly eastward. The route, running along the riverbanks, turns to the southward, until turning eastward once again. The route continues into Howe Township and quickly leaves, turning to the northeast and into the dense forestry. Several miles later, the route actually makes a northwestern progression, but it is for a short time, and the highway goes back to a normal northeastern progression.

There are more and more gaps in the forestry and the highway enters Barnes. In Barnes, PA 666 intersects with PA 948's northern terminus. After Barnes, the route becomes more civilized, and the highway passes more homes. Nearing its end, PA 666 re-enters the forested area, leaving quickly. The highway terminates in Sheffield, at an intersection with US 6.

== History ==
PA 666 was assigned in the mass numbering of state routes in 1928. This routing of PA 666 from Barnes to Nebraska, small municipalities in Forest and Warren Counties. After remaining intact for thirteen years, the highway was extended to Newmansville to terminate at PA 36 and PA 208. This southern extension is now Newmansville Road, three quadrant routes, and two township roads. In 1946, PA 666 was extended westward to East Hickory, with the extension to Newmansville being decommissioned.

Several highways numbered "666" have experienced high rates of sign theft. According to a 2008 report, this appears to not be the case with PA 666 with a PennDOT spokesperson saying few signs have been stolen.

== Major intersections ==
County	Location	mi	km	Destinations	Notes
Forest	Hickory Township	0.000	0.000	US 62 – Tionesta, Warren	Western terminus
Warren	Sheffield Township	31.197	50.207	PA 948 south – Ridgway	Northern terminus of PA 948
Warren	Sheffield Township	33.557	54.005	US 6 – Warren, Kane	Eastern terminus
1.000 mi = 1.609 km; 1.000 km = 0.621 mi
