= Tanbark Trail =

Hiking trail in Pennsylvania, United States

Coordinates: 41.675576°N 79.227000°W

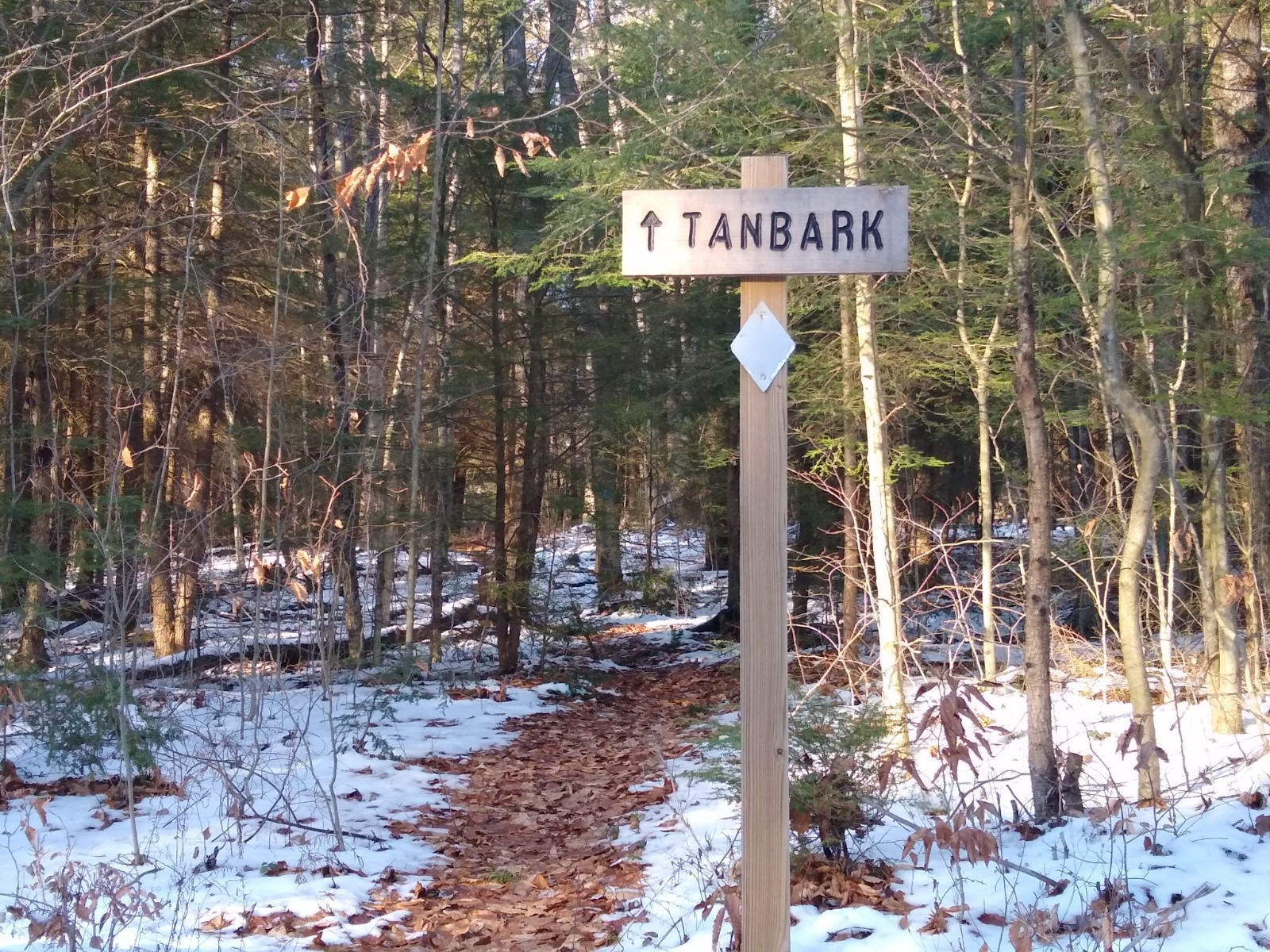
- The Tanbark Trail south of Hearts Content Scenic Area
- Length: 8.8 mi (14.2 km)
- Location: Warren County, Pennsylvania, US
- Trailheads: U.S. Route 62, Warren County
- Use: Hiking
- Elevation change: Moderate
- Difficulty: Moderate
- Season: Year-round
- Hazards: Uneven and rocky terrain, rattlesnakes, mosquitoes, ticks, black bears

The Tanbark Trail is an 8.8-mile (14.2 km) hiking trail in Allegheny National Forest in northwestern Pennsylvania, which is usually described as a spur of the North Country Trail. It is known for visiting some of the least disturbed areas of the National Forest, as well as several large rock formations and scenic glens along small streams.

== Route ==
At its southern end, the Tanbark Trail departs from the North Country Trail near that trail's crossing of Forest Road 116 in southern Warren County. A short segment at the southern end of the trail is within Hickory Creek Wilderness. Trending to the northwest, the Tanbark Trail skirts Hearts Content Scenic Area and can be accessed from that attraction's day-hiking trails. The Tanbark Trail then passes near the eastern end of the Hickory Creek Trail, after which the hiking is mostly level across a high plateau area. At about five miles the trail enters the territory of Allegheny National Recreation Area. At about seven miles, the trail begins a lengthy and occasionally steep descent into the valley formed by the Allegheny River, and ends across from a small parking lot on U.S. Route 62, within sight of the river and about 7.2 miles south of that road's junction with U.S. Route 6.
