= Twin Lakes Trail =

Hiking trail in Pennsylvania, United States

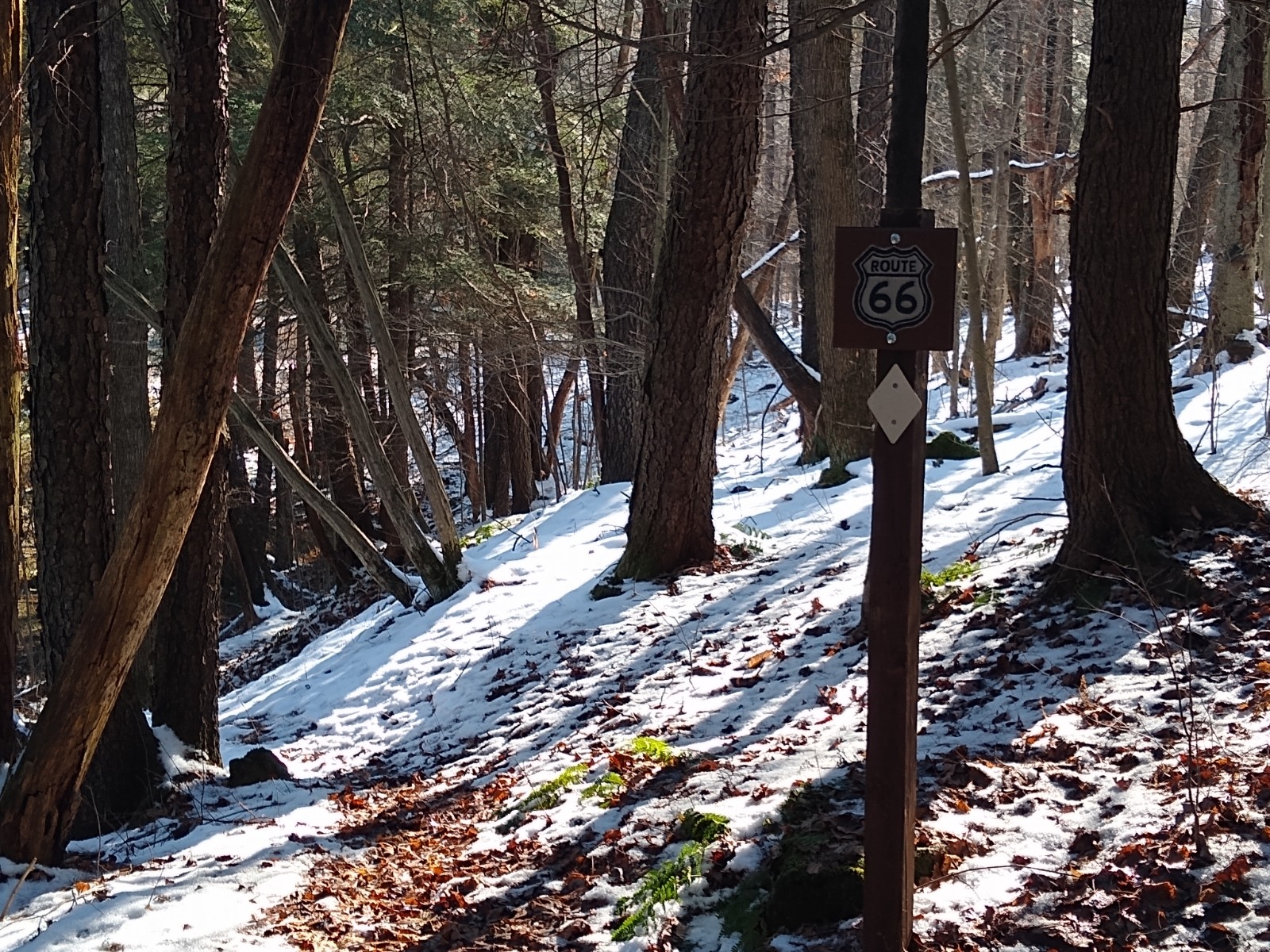
- The Twin Lakes Trail approaching its crossing of PA Route 66
- Length: 15.8 mi (25.4 km)
- Location: Elk County, Forest County, and Warren County, Pennsylvania, US
- Trailheads: Twin Lakes Recreation Area, northern Elk County
- Use: Hiking
- Elevation change: Moderate
- Difficulty: Moderate
- Season: Year-round
- Hazards: Uneven and rocky terrain, rattlesnakes, mosquitoes, ticks, black bears

The Twin Lakes Trail is a 15.8-mile (25.4 km) hiking trail in Allegheny National Forest in northwestern Pennsylvania. It is often described as a connection between Twin Lakes Recreation Area in Elk County and the North Country Trail. The Twin Lakes Trail is accessed from the recreation area via a short interpretive trail. It also visits Tionesta Scenic Area. In its eastern and central sections, the Twin Lakes Trail traverses some of the more developed areas of Allegheny National Forest, passing many old oil drilling sites and more recent fracking installations.

== Route ==
From a parking lot in Twin Lakes Recreation Area, near Pennsylvania Route 321 in northern Elk County, reach the Twin Lakes Trail by hiking 0.7 mile on the Black Cherry Interpretive Trail. The Twin Lakes Trail then departs to the west through Allegheny National Forest. At about 1.2 miles, pass a junction with the Mill Creek Trail, which heads to the south. The Twin Lakes Trail continues to the west, and at about 1.8 miles begins a lengthy walk alongside Wolf Run. At 4.1 miles, the trail trends away from Wolf Run, jogs briefly on Pennsylvania Route 66 (with parking area), and rises up the side of the valley.

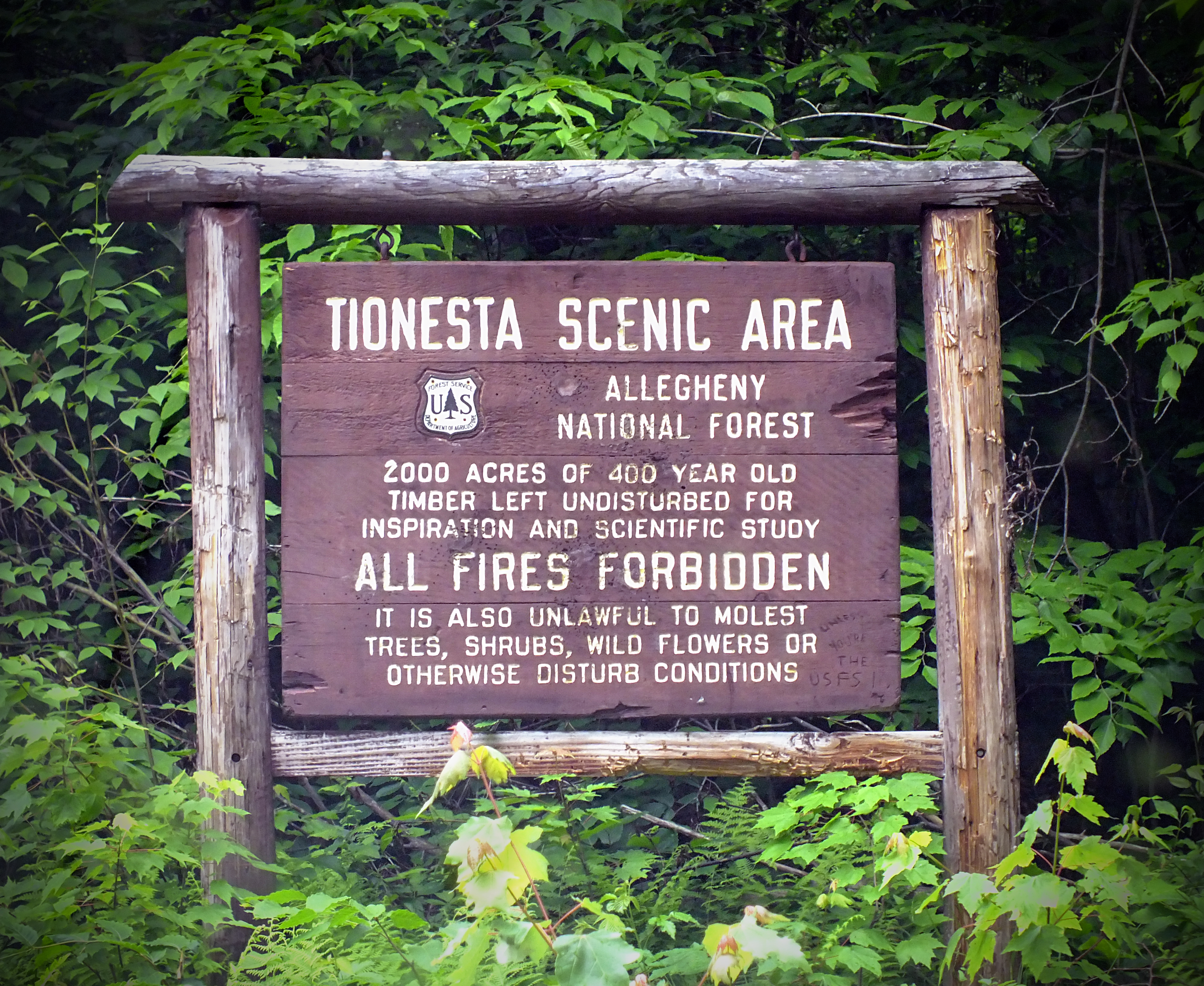
The Twin Lakes Trail passes through a corner of Tionesta Scenic Area.

The trail remains on high ground for several miles then descends alongside a small stream until crossing Forest Road 152 at 7.3 miles. The trail reaches Wolf Run again and follows it for another lengthy stretch. At 9.2 miles, cross the incoming Coon Run; that stream and Wolf Run converge to form the south branch of Tionesta Creek. The trail follows this creek for about a mile, including a wide crossing at a spot where an old footbridge failed and was never replaced. The trail, now trending to the northwest, climbs gradually away from the creek, crosses Crane Run, and at 12.9 miles crosses Forest Road 443 east of the small village of Brookston. Now heading north, the trail wraps around the "four corners" point of Elk, Forest, Warren, and McKean Counties, passing through parts of three of those (not including McKean) in less than one mile. The trail passes near Tionesta Wild Area, crosses two branches of Fork Run, and then crosses the border into the southern reaches of Tionesta Scenic Area, ending after 15.8 miles at the North Country Trail.
