= Chapman Lake (Pennsylvania) =

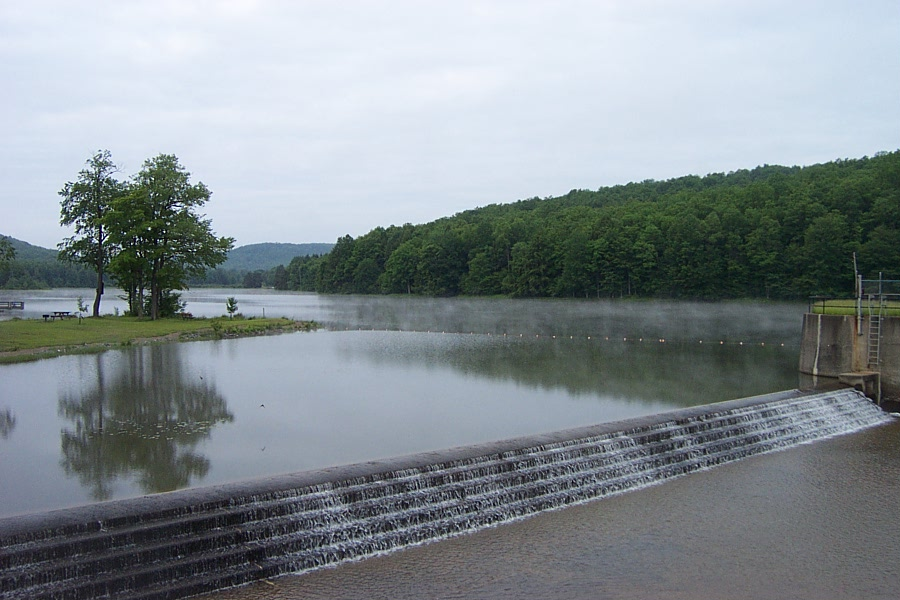

- Location within Pennsylvania Location within the United States
- Location: Chapman State Park, Warren County, Pennsylvania
- Coordinates: 41°45′12″N 079°10′17″W
- Type: reservoir
- Primary inflows: West Branch of the Tionesta Creek
- Primary outflows: West Branch of the Tionesta Creek
- Basin countries: United States
- Surface area: 66 acres (27 ha)
- Surface elevation: 1,424 ft (434 m)

Chapman Lake is a reservoir located in Warren County, Pennsylvania entirely within the Chapman State Park. Chapman State Park is a 862-acre (349 ha) state park that opens from sunrise to sunset.

The lake is formed by the disbandment of the West Branch of the Tionesta Creek. The lake spans 68 acres (28 ha) and has fishing for both warm-water and cold-water fish. The park is off US 6, near the town of Clarendon. The nearest hospital is Warren General Hospital.

== See also ==
- List of lakes in Pennsylvania
