= R. Thompson's Island =

Island in Warren County, Pennsylvania

Coordinates: 41°45′21″N 79°17′38″W

R. Thompson's Island is a 30-acre (120,000 m^{2}) alluvial island in the upper Allegheny River. It is located in Watson Township, Warren County, Pennsylvania, and is part of the Allegheny Islands Wilderness.

Most of the trees on R. Thompson Island were destroyed during a local tornado in 1975.
