= Chapman State Park =

State park in Pennsylvania, United States

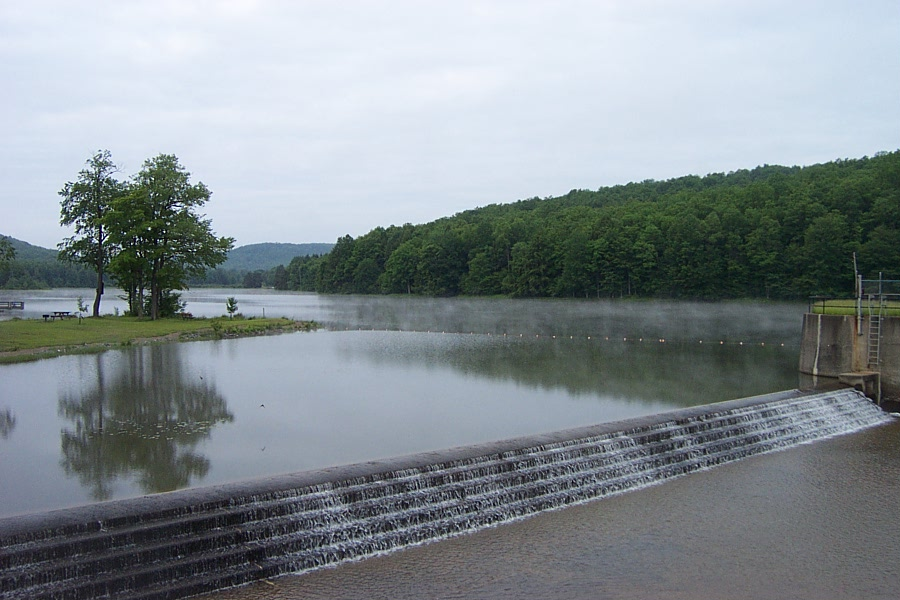
- Chapman Lake

- Location within Pennsylvania Location within the United States
- Interactive map of Chapman State Park
- Location: Warren County, Pennsylvania, United States
- Coordinates: 41°45′27″N 79°10′16″W
- Area: 862 acres (349 ha)
- Elevation: 1,526 ft (465 m)
- Established: 1951
- Administrator: Pennsylvania Department of Conservation and Natural Resources
- Named for: Dr. Leroy E. Chapman
- Website: Official website
- Pennsylvania State Parks

Chapman State Park is a 862-acre (349 ha) Pennsylvania state park in Pleasant Township, Warren County, Pennsylvania near Clarendon, in the United States. The man-made Chapman Lake covers 68 acres (28 ha) of the park. Chapman State Park is named in honor of Dr. Leroy E. Chapman. Dr. Chapman was a state senator from 1929 until 1963. He was part of several civic groups that pushed for the creation of a state park in Warren County. Chapman State Park, opened in 1951, is adjacent to Allegheny National Forest and State Game Land 29 just off U.S. Route 6.

== Recreation ==
Chapman State Park is open for year-round recreation. Chapman Lake is open for swimming, boating, and fishing. A large picnic area is near the beach and overlooks the lake. Five pavilions are available by reservation or first-come, first-served. A rustic, wooded campground is open mid-April through mid-December. One hundred and twenty miles (190 km) of trails are open to hiking. Chapman State Park is also open to hunting and fishing in the streams as well as the lake. The park stays open in the winter for cross-country skiing, snowmobiling and ice fishing.

The unguarded, sand beach is open from 8:00 AM until sunset daily from the Friday before Memorial Day through Labor Day, each summer. A concession is available in the beach area offering snacks, beverages, and ice cream treats.

Gas powered boats are prohibited on Chapman Lake. Electric powered and non powered boats must have a current registration with any state, a launch permit from the Pennsylvania Fish and Boat Commission, or a mooring or launch permit from Pennsylvania Bureau of State Parks. A concession is available adjacent to the beach for renting canoes and kayaks.

Chapman lake provides a habitat for warm water and cold water fish. Fishermen may catch brook and brown trout, bluegill, sunfish, yellow perch, largemouth bass, and sucker. Chapman Lake and the West Branch Tionesta Creek above and below the lake are stocked with trout several times a year.

Visitors to Chapman State Park have several choices for overnight accommodations. The rustic campground in a wooded area has 81 campsites, with two shower houses, and water hydrants. Many campsites offer 30 Amp or 50 Amp electric service. Approximately half the sites are pet friendly. Three cottages are available to rent. The cottages sleep up to five people in single and double bunks. Each cottage has wooden floors, a porch, electric heat, lights, and outlets. The cottages also have a picnic table and fire ring in the yard area. In addition to the more traditional cottages two Mongolian style yurts are available to rent. These round structures are mounted on a wooden platform and have a cooking stove, refrigerator, tables, chairs, countertop, electric lights, heat and outlets. Picnic tables and fire rings are in the yard area.

Chapman State Park is a trailhead for an extensive network of trails in the 517,000 acres (209,000 ha) Allegheny National Forest. All backpackers are asked to register at the park office and leave word about where they plan to hike and when they plan to return. Hikers are also encouraged to take a map and compass.

Over 450 acres (180 ha) of Chapman State Park are open to hunting. Hunters may park their vehicle in the park to gain access to the surrounding state game lands and Allegheny National Forest. Common game species are white-tailed deer, American black bear, wild turkey, eastern gray squirrel, and ruffed grouse. All hunters are expected to follow the rules and regulations of the Pennsylvania Game Commission.
