= King Island =

King Island, Kings Island or King's Island may refer to:

Australia

- King Island (Queensland)
- King Island, at Wellington Point, Queensland
- King Island (Tasmania)
  - King Island Council, the local government area that contains the Tasmanian island

Canada

- King Island (British Columbia)
- King Island (Nunavut)
- King Island (Saskatchewan)
- King Island, Newfoundland and Labrador, a settlement

United States

- King Island (Alaska)
- King Island (California)
- Kings Island (California)
- King's Island (Connecticut)
- King's Island (Pennsylvania)
- Kings Island, amusement park in Mason, Ohio

Elsewhere

- Kadan Kyun, formerly known as King Island, in Myanmar's Mergui Archipelago
- King Island (New Zealand), island off the north coast of the North Island
- King's Island, Limerick, Ireland, an area of Limerick city
- King Peninsula, Antarctica, originally believed to be an island ("King Island") but later discovered to be a peninsula
