= Mill Creek Trail =

Hiking trail in Pennsylvania, United States

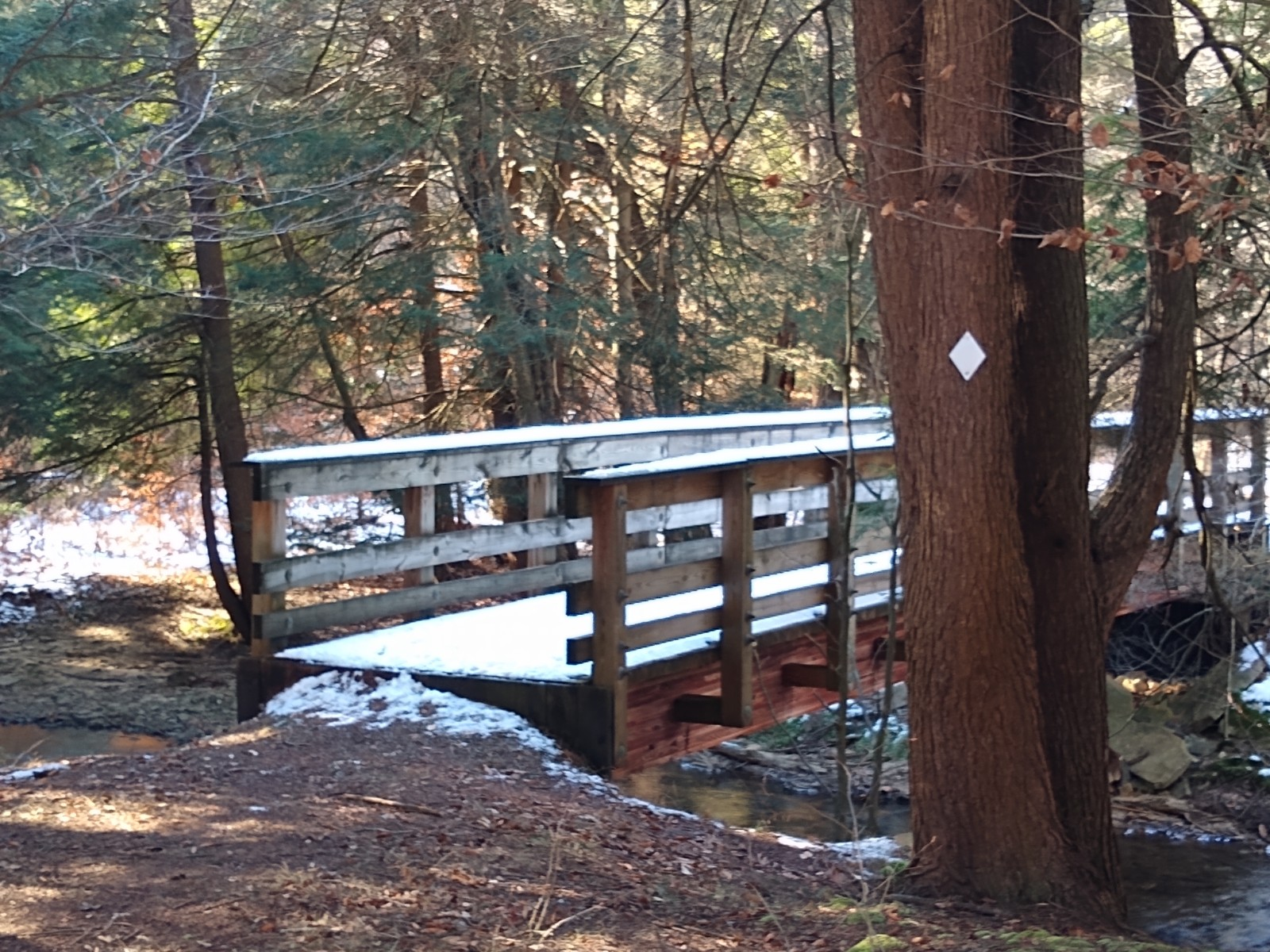
- Footbridge that carries the Mill Creek Trail over Big Mill Creek
- Length: 5.6 mi (9.0 km)
- Location: Elk County, Pennsylvania, US
- Trailheads: Pennsylvania Route 948, northwestern Elk County
- Use: Hiking
- Elevation change: Low
- Difficulty: Moderate
- Season: Year-round
- Hazards: Uneven and rocky terrain, rattlesnakes, mosquitoes, ticks, black bears

The Mill Creek Trail is a 5.6-mile (9.0 km) hiking trail in Allegheny National Forest in northwestern Pennsylvania, and is usually described as a spur of the Twin Lakes Trail.

== Route ==
The Mill Creek Trail begins at a small parking lot and rest area on Pennsylvania Route 948, about 10 miles north of Ridgway; the lot also serves the Brush Hollow Cross Country Ski Trail. The two trails depart northbound from the parking area and share the same path for about 0.2 of a mile to a junction, where the Mill Creek Trail turns right, crosses Big Mill Creek, and then turns north and follows that creek's valley upstream. The trail crosses several incoming tributary streams and traverses a variety of forest ecosystems. Near its northern end it passes through Kane Experimental Forest. After 5.6 miles, the Mill Creek Trail ends at the Twin Lakes Trail, about 1.2 miles west of Twin Lakes Recreation Area; the trail junction is near a small parking lot on Forest Road 138.
