= No-Name Island =

No Name Island could refer to:

- No-Name Island (Pennsylvania)
- No Name Island, Bermuda
