= Hickory Creek Trail =

Hiking trail in Pennsylvania, United States

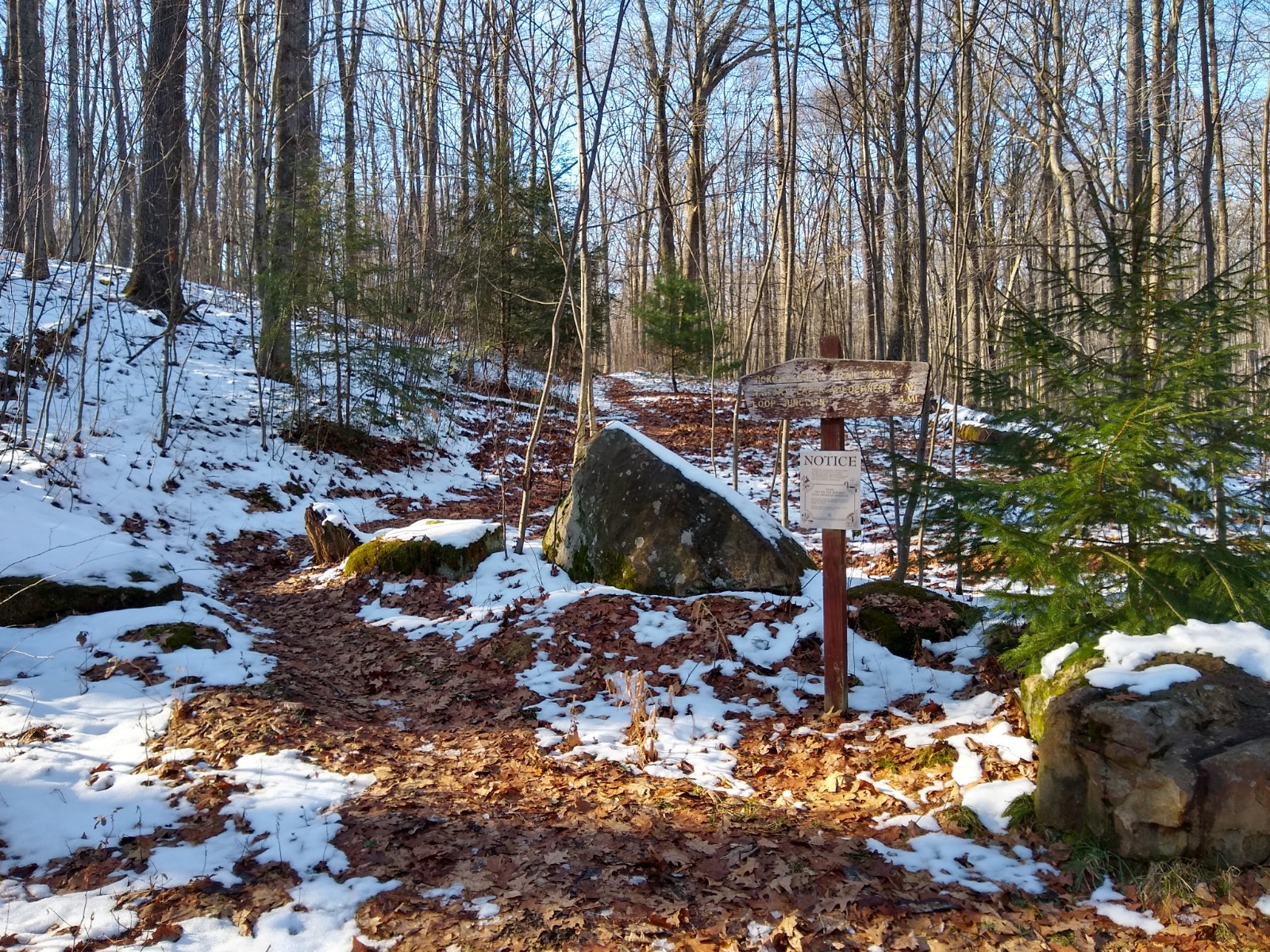
- The trailhead for the Hickory Creek Trail, a short distance before it enters Hickory Creek Wilderness
- Length: 11.6 mi (18.7 km)
- Location: Warren County, Pennsylvania, US
- Trailheads: Hearts Content Road, Warren County
- Use: Hiking
- Elevation change: Moderate
- Difficulty: Moderate
- Season: Year-round
- Hazards: Uneven and rocky terrain, rattlesnakes, mosquitoes, ticks, black bears

The Hickory Creek Trail is an 11.6-mile (18.7 km) hiking trail in Allegheny National Forest in northwestern Pennsylvania. The trail traverses remote areas of the Hickory Creek Wilderness; its route includes a large loop and a short entrance trail that must be completed in both directions.

The trail has been routed to avoid many of the human developments that are visible elsewhere in the National Forest, and except for occasional blazes the trail is left in a largely primitive state per the rules of the federal Wilderness Area. Trail maintenance efforts are designed to minimize environmental damage. While often completed as a day hike, the Hickory Creek Trail is also promoted as an overnight hike for backpackers who are new to the hobby.

== Route ==
The Hickory Creek Trail begins on Hearts Content Road, a short distance north of the driveway to the parking lot for Hearts Content Scenic Area. The entrance trail heads west from the road and meets the main loop at 0.5 mile. To follow the loop clockwise, the hiker turns to the south and reaches a tributary of Hickory Creek at 1.5 miles. The trail soon turns to the northwest and ascends and descends moderately several times along the edge of a plateau until reaching Coon Run at 3.8 miles. This area features many meadows and areas of uncommonly open woods, and the trail walks through an old artillery range where cannons were tested during World War I.

Now trending to the north, the trail follows an old railroad grade alongside Jacks Run for a considerable distance. At about 7.8 miles the trail climbs over a saddle between two watersheds, turns to the east, and passes some views over the valley formed by East Hickory Creek. The trail ascends and descends another edge of the plateau several times until reaching the junction with the entrance trail at 11.1 miles, after which the hiker repeats that trail eastbound to the terminus.
