= Courson Island =

Island in Pennsylvania, U.S.

Coordinates: 41°40′55″N 79°22′45″W

Courson Island is a 61.5-acre (249,000 m^{2}) alluvial island in the upper Allegheny River. It is located in the Borough of Tidioute and in Limestone Township in Warren County, Pennsylvania, and is part of the Allegheny Islands Wilderness in Allegheny National Forest.

The island is a prime location for old growth, virgin, and river bottom forests.
