= Crull's Island =

Island in Warren County, Pennsylvania

Coordinates: 41°49′13″N 79°16′17″W

Crull's Island is a 96.2-acre (389,000 m^{2}) alluvial island in the upper Allegheny River. It is located in Pleasant Township, Pennsylvania, and is part of the Allegheny Islands Wilderness in Allegheny National Forest.

The lower third of Crull's Island was briefly farmed, but was abandoned when it proved to be unprofitable. It is now a prime location for old growth, virgin, and river bottom forests. The forests contain Silver Maple, Sugar Maple, American Sycamore, and Slippery Elm.

== See also ==
- List of old growth forests
