= Baker Island (Pennsylvania) =

Island in Forest County, Pennsylvania, United States

Coordinates: 41°31′35″N 79°26′23″W

Baker Island is a 66.9-acre (271,000 m^{2}) alluvial island in the upper Allegheny River. It is located in Tionesta Township and Harmony Township in Forest County, Pennsylvania, and is part of the Allegheny Islands Wilderness in Allegheny National Forest.

Most of the trees on Baker Island were destroyed by a 1985 tornado. Though the island does host many large American Sycamore, including the tallest American Sycamore in Pennsylvania. The tree measured 148 ft in June 2009.
