= Watson Township, Pennsylvania =

Watson Township is the name of some places in the U.S. state of Pennsylvania:

- Watson Township, Lycoming County, Pennsylvania
- Watson Township, Warren County, Pennsylvania
