= Thompson's Island (disambiguation) =

Several islands have been named Thompson's Island:

- Thompson's Island is a small alluvial island in the upper Allegheny River.
- In the 18th century, Possession Island (Namibia) was also known as Thompson's Island.
- On 25 March 1822, Lt. Commander Matthew C. Perry claimed Cayo Hueso (Key West), naming it Thompson's Island for US Secretary of the Navy Smith Thompson.
- Thompson Island (Massachusetts) is an island in Boston Harbor.
