= Wheeler and Dusenbury Lumber Company =

Between 1887 and 1938, railroads built and owned by the Wheeler & Dusenbury Co., Endeavor, Pennsylvania, formed one of the largest logging rail networks in Northwest Pennsylvania. A logging railroad network sprawled over Warren County, Pennsylvania and Forest County, Pennsylvania fed two large band mills at Endeavor, Pennsylvania, hosted rod and geared steam locomotives, and for a time, even connected the Collins Pine empire to the outside world as the Hickory Valley Railroad. The railroad featured an entry in the Official Railway Guide, a formal timetable, and the only rail bridge across the Allegheny River between Oil City and Warren to connect the empire to the Pennsylvania Railroad at West Hickory.

W&D's policies of widespread selective tract cutting resulted in the logging railroads being active until the 1930s, supplying the Mayburg Chemical Company with chemical wood on second-growth tracts, and contributing to the survival of the Sheffield & Tionesta Railroad until World War II. W&D's legacy can also be seen at Hearts Content National Scenic Area, where a tract of virgin timber was saved and is a public recreation area today. Even in 1906, W&D was known for saving virgin tracts of timber.

== See also ==
- Forest railway
