= Hickory Creek Wilderness =

Wilderness area in Pennsylvania, United States

- IUCN category Ib (wilderness area)
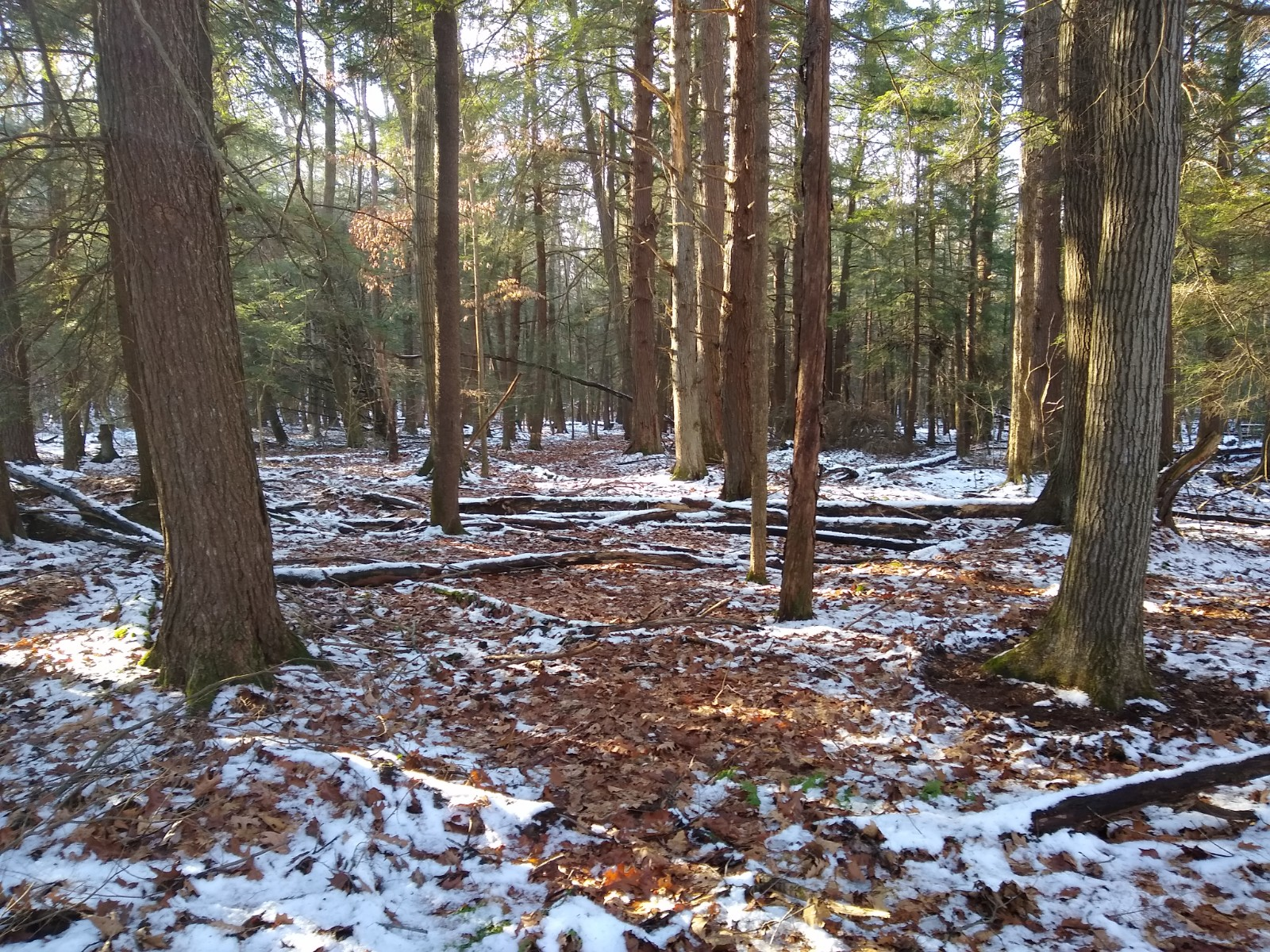
- An old gravel road that has been reclaimed by the forest, near the eastern border of Hickory Creek Wilderness

- Location within the United States
- Location: Warren County, Pennsylvania, USA
- Coordinates: 41°40′29″N 079°17′29″W
- Area: 8,663 acres (3,505.8 ha)
- Established: 1984
- Governing body: U.S. Forest Service
- Website: www.fs.usda.gov/r09/allegheny/recreation

The Hickory Creek Wilderness is a 8,663-acre (3,505.8 ha) wilderness area located in the Bradford Ranger District of the Allegheny National Forest in Warren County, Pennsylvania. It is one of only two designated wilderness areas in the forest and was created in October 1984.

== Topography ==
Elevation in Hickory Creek Wilderness ranges from 1,273 feet (388 m), where East Hickory Creek exits the wilderness, to a plateau at 1,900 feet (580 m). The gentle to moderate terrain is drained by East Hickory Creek and Middle Hickory Creek.

== Flora and fauna ==
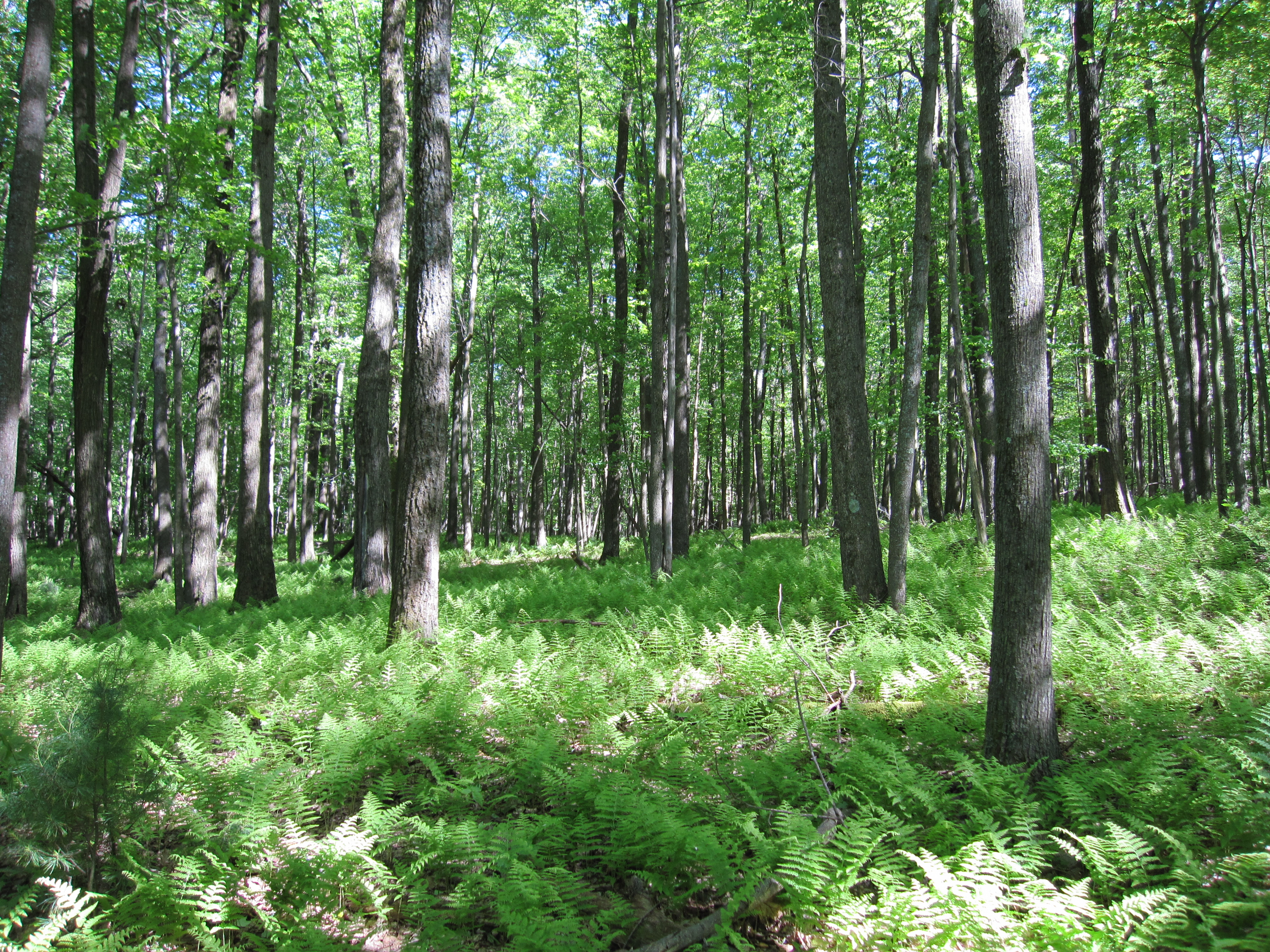
Hickory Run Wilderness, June 2011

Hickory Creek Wilderness is primarily characterized by black cherry and beech, with scattered hemlock and clumps of oak, maple and birch, with an understory of abundant flowers, ferns, shrubs, and mosses. Large white pine can be found scattered in open areas. American black bear, white-tailed deer, wild turkey, barred owl, and pileated woodpecker are common in the Wilderness. Small native brook trout can be found in both East Hickory and Middle Hickory Creeks.

== Hiking trails ==
The Hickory Creek Wilderness contains several unofficial and unblazed trails, largely on old railroad grades, mostly along the scenic Middle and East Forks of Hickory Creek, though a 1985 tornado has made some sections impassable. The area also includes the maintained Hickory Creek Trail, an 11.6-mile loop, which mostly traverses high ground between the two branches of the creek. While maintained by volunteers, that trail is left in a largely primitive state per the rules of the federal Wilderness Area. A short segment of the Tanbark Trail crosses the eastern corner of the wilderness area.

== See also ==
- List of wilderness areas of the United States
- Wilderness Act
