= Allegheny Islands Wilderness =

Protected wilderness area in Pennsylvania, United States

- IUCN category Ib (wilderness area)
- Location within the United States
- Location: Warren / Forest counties, Pennsylvania, USA
- Coordinates: 41°45′05″N 79°18′56″W
- Area: 368 acres (149 ha)
- Established: 1984
- Governing body: U.S. Forest Service

The Allegheny Islands Wilderness is located in the Allegheny National Forest. It comprises seven islands in the Allegheny River, totaling 368 acres (149 ha). All are alluvial origin. The islands are located between Buckaloons Recreation Area and Tionesta, Pennsylvania.

The Allegheny Islands Wilderness was created by Congress in 1984 as part of the National Wilderness Preservation System. It is one of the smallest wilderness areas of the United States.

== Flora ==
These islands are characterized by river bottom forest types such as willows, American sycamore, shagbark hickory, green ash, and silver maple. Crull's and Thompson's Island contain 156 acres (63 ha) of mature and old-growth forests.

== Fauna ==
Bald eagles have returned to the area, and otters have been re-introduced. The area is home to ospreys, soft-shelled turtles, great blue herons, kingfishers, common mergansers, mallards, and beavers.

The Allegheny River is home to a variety of freshwater mussels.

The islands are home to the federally endangered clubshell mussel (Pleurobema clava) and the Northern riffleshell (Epioblasma torulosa rangiana).

They are also home to rare fishes, including the bluebreast darter (Etheostoma camurum), and the spotted darter (Etheostoma maculatum).

== List of islands ==
- Crull's Island
- Thompson's Island
- R. Thompson's Island
- Courson Island
- King's Islands
- Baker Islands
- No-Name Island

== In popular culture ==
The area was featured in "Brian Finch's Black Op", the November 3, 2015 episode of Limitless.

== See also ==
- List of wilderness areas of the United States
- Wilderness Act
