= King's Island (Pennsylvania) =

Island in Allegheny River, Forest County

Coordinates: 41°33′23″N 79°25′41″W

King Island is a 35.7-acre (144,000 m^{2}) alluvial island in the upper Allegheny River. It is located in Harmony Township, Forest County, Pennsylvania, and is part of the Allegheny Islands Wilderness in Allegheny National Forest.

King Island is one of the more accessible of the seven islands in the Allegheny River Wilderness Islands. It is a prime location for old growth, virgin, and river bottom forests. The waters of the Allegheny River around the northwest side Island are a riffle habitat, a prime location for freshwater mussels.

Two abandoned oil wells can be found on the island.
