= Thompson's Island =

Alluvial island

Coordinates: 41°47′35″N 79°17′04″W

Thompson's Island is a 60-acre (240,000 m^{2}) alluvial island in the upper Allegheny River. It is located in Pleasant Township, Pennsylvania, and is part of the Allegheny Islands Wilderness in Allegheny National Forest.

The island's forests contain old growth Silver Maple, Sugar Maple, American Sycamore, and Slippery Elm.

Thompson's Island is the site of the only American Revolutionary War battle in Northwest Pennsylvania. Colonel Daniel Brodhead defeated the Senecas in 1779.

== See also ==
- List of old growth forests
- Possession Island (Namibia)
