= Watson Township, Warren County, Pennsylvania =

Township in Pennsylvania, United States

Coordinates: 41°42′00″N 79°15′59″W

Watson Township
- Township
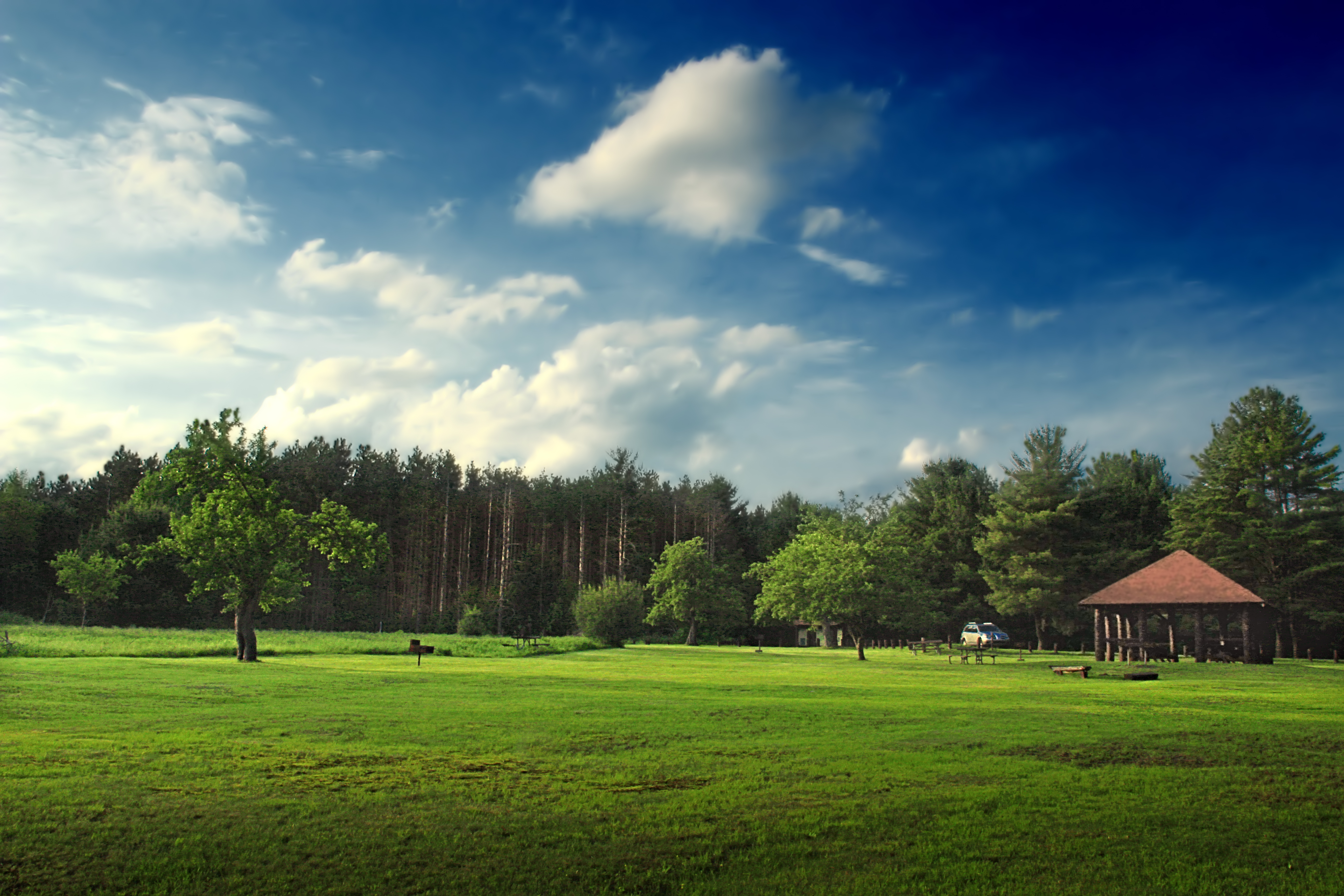
- Hearts Content Scenic Area

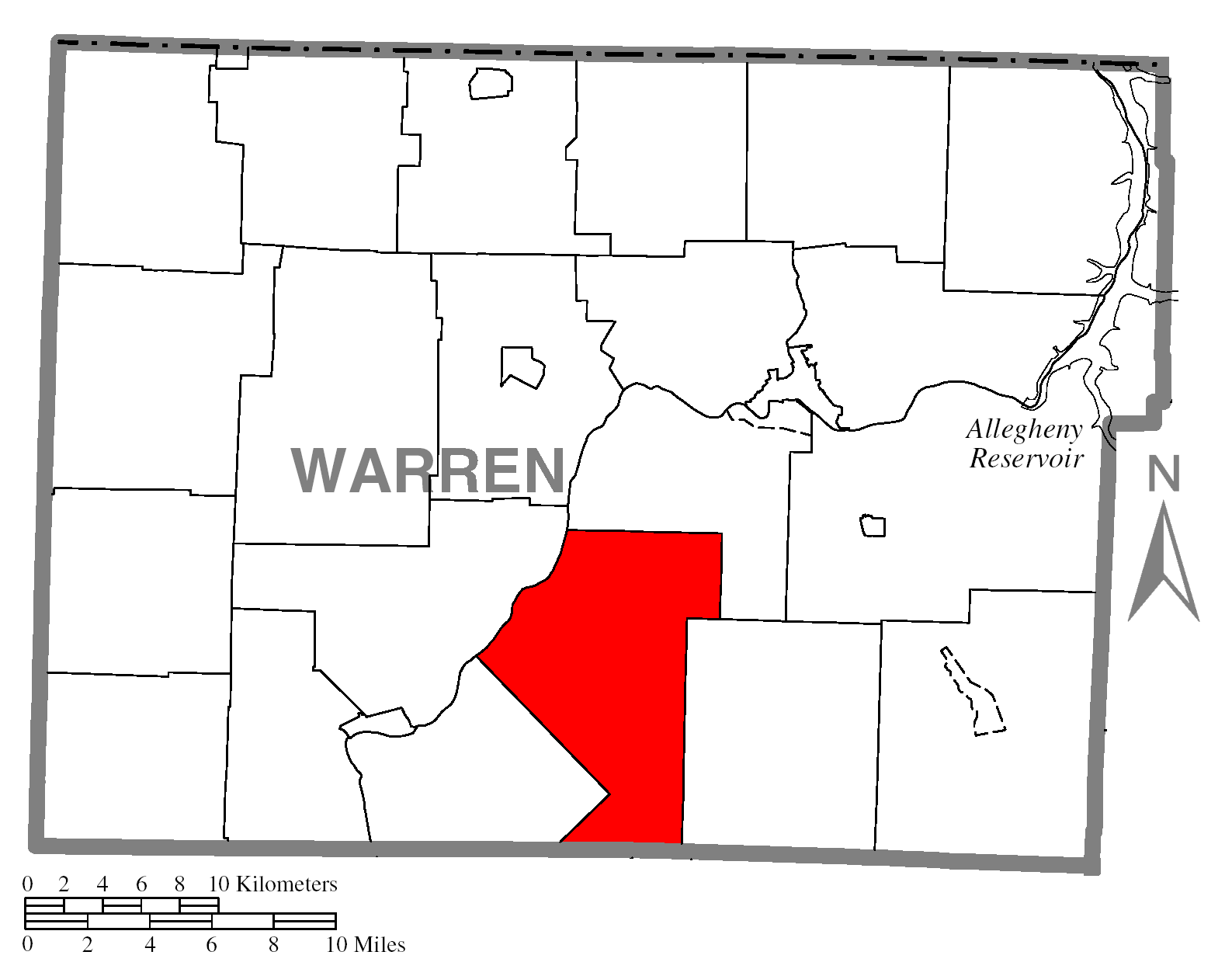
- Location of Watson Township in Warren County

- Location of Warren County in Pennsylvania
- Country: United States
- State: Pennsylvania
- County: Warren County

Area
  - Total: 51.17 sq mi (132.54 km^{2})
  - Land: 50.82 sq mi (131.63 km^{2})
  - Water: 0.35 sq mi (0.91 km^{2})

Population (2020)
  - Total: 230
  - Estimate (2023): 223
  - Density: 5.2/sq mi (1.99/km^{2})
- Time zone: UTC-4 (EST)
  - Summer (DST): UTC-5 (EDT)
- Area code: 814
- FIPS code: 42-123-81584

Watson Township is a township in Warren County, Pennsylvania, United States. The population was 230 at the 2020 census, down from 274 at the 2010 census.

== Geography ==
According to the United States Census Bureau, the township has a total area of 49.9 square miles (129.2 km^{2}), of which 49.6 square miles (128.4 km^{2}) is land and 0.3 square mile (0.8 km^{2}) (0.62%) is water.

== Demographics ==
Historical population
| Census | Pop. | Note | %± |
|---|---|---|---|
| 2000 | 322 | | — |
| 2010 | 274 | | −14.9% |
| 2020 | 230 | | −16.1% |
| 2023 (est.) | 223 | | −3.0% |
U.S. Decennial Census

As of the census of 2000, there were 322 people, 121 households, and 93 families residing in the township. The population density was 6.5 people per square mile (2.5/km^{2}). There were 451 housing units at an average density of 9.1/sq mi (3.5/km^{2}). The racial makeup of the township was 99.07% White, 0.31% Native American, and 0.62% from other races. In addition, Hispanic or Latino of any race were 0.62% of the population.

There were 121 households, out of which 39.7% had children under the age of 18 living with them, 66.9% were married couples living together, 6.6% had a female householder with no husband present, and 23.1% were non-families. 17.4% of all households were made up of individuals, and 3.3% had someone living alone who was 65 years of age or older. The average household size was 2.66 and the average family size was 3.04.

In the township the population was spread out, with 27.3% under the age of 18, 4.3% from 18 to 24, 30.4% from 25 to 44, 28.6% from 45 to 64, and 9.3% who were 65 years of age or older. The median age was 40 years. For every 100 females, there were 114.7 males. For every 100 females age 18 and over, there were 107.1 males.

The median income for a household in the township was $36,750, and the median income for a family was $46,458. Males had a median income of $39,375 versus $23,750 for females. The per capita income for the township was $15,909. About 7.0% of families and 7.7% of the population were below the poverty line, including 11.4% of those under age 18 and none of those age 65 or over.

== Communities and locations ==
- Allegheny Islands Wilderness - A wilderness preservation area comprising several islands in the Allegheny River.
- Allegheny National Forest - A national forest occupying the entire township.
- Allegheny River - A major river forming the township's northwestern border.
- Dunham Siding - A village on Tidioute Road in the eastern part of the township.
- Harmonson Corners - A village on Pleasant Road in the northern part of the township.
- Hearts Content - A village on Hearts Content Road in the south-central part of the township.
- Hearts Content Scenic Area - A protected tract of old-growth forest approximately one mile north of the eponymous village.
