= Tionesta Scenic and Research Natural Areas =

Protected areas in Pennsylvania, US

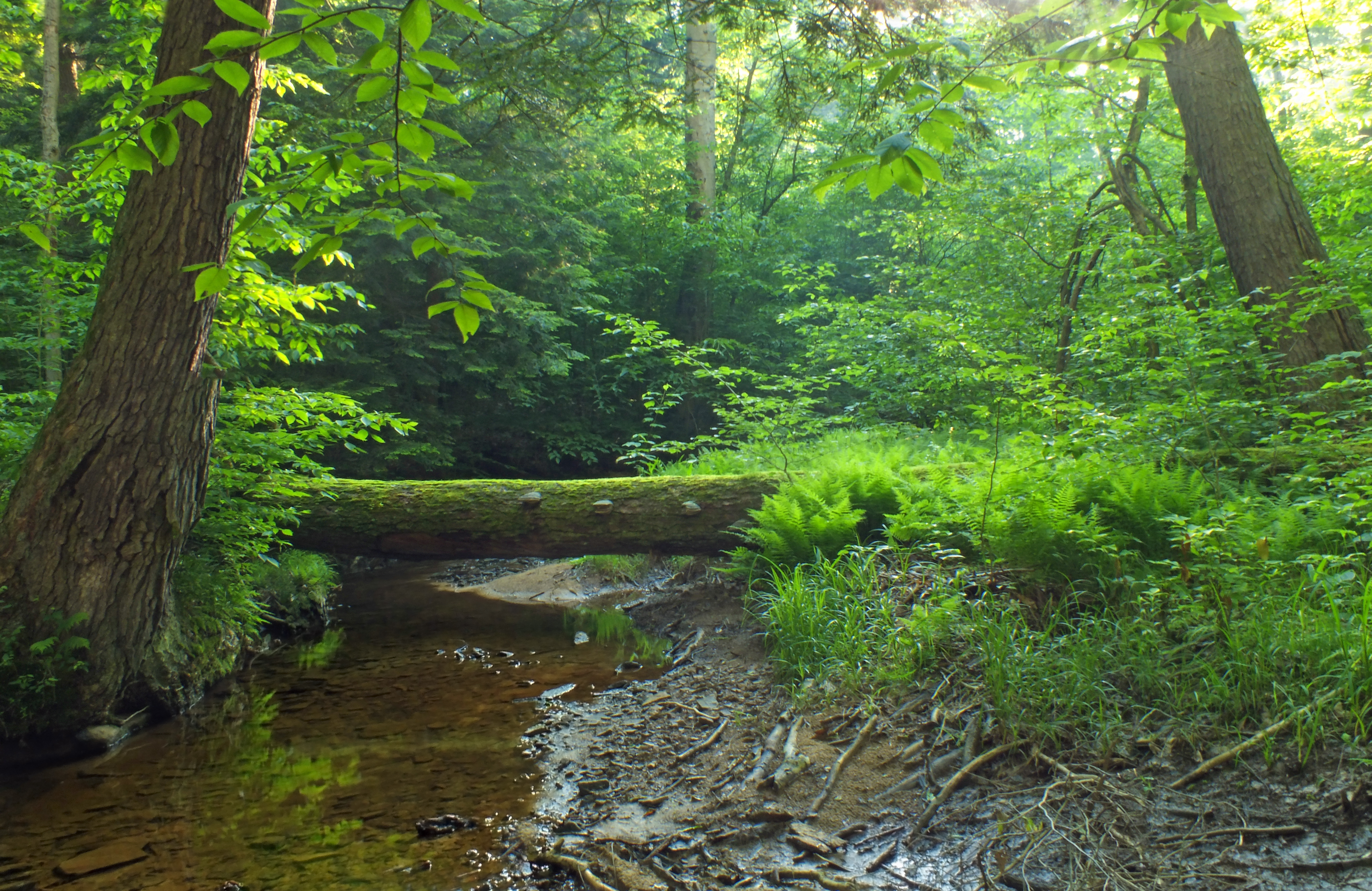
- East Fork Run, McKean County, within the Tionesta Research Natural Area of Allegheny National Forest

- Location within Pennsylvania
- Location: Warren County and McKean County, Pennsylvania
- Nearest city: Kane
- Coordinates: 41°38′38″N 78°56′14″W
- Area: 4,131 acres (1,672 ha)

U.S. National Natural Landmark
- Designated: 1973

The Tionesta Scenic and Research Natural Areas are adjacent protected areas in the Allegheny National Forest of northwestern Pennsylvania. They cover a combined 4,131 acres (1,672 ha) of the Allegheny Plateau and contain some 4,000 acres (1,600 ha) of old-growth forest representative of the area. They are located in Warren County and McKean County.

== History ==
The areas are a remnant of the original forest that once covered 6 million acres (24,000 km^{2}) on the Allegheny Plateau of New York and Pennsylvania. The old growth forest consists of 300- to 400-year-old American beech, Eastern hemlock and some sugar maple. Other tree species are yellow birch, sweet birch, black cherry, red maple, American basswood, tulip poplar, and cucumber magnolia. It is the type of forest that greeted early settlers and later supported a vast lumber industry.

The tract of old growth was purchased by the federal government in 1936. The Scenic Area was dedicated to aesthetic purposes, and the remaining area was set aside as a Research Natural Area for scientific studies. In 1973, both areas were added to the National Registry of National Natural Landmarks Program in recognition of their unique status. During the early evening hours of May 31, 1985, a severe tornado moved through the northern half of the Tionesta Scenic Area.

== Natural features ==
This secluded area is nearly roadless and offers great opportunities for solitude and nature study. You may encounter white-tailed deer, American black bear, fishers, and several bat species. Bird watchers can search for numerous species that prefer old growth forests, like barred owls, northern goshawks, pileated woodpeckers, flycatchers, thrushes, and warblers.

The area is a typical plateau cut by streams, with flat uplands and steep-sided valleys. Elevations range from 1,500 feet (460 m) in stream bottom areas, to 1,960 feet (600 m) on plateau tops. Large rock outcrops can be found throughout this area.

== Trails ==
A portion of the North Country National Scenic Trail passes through the Tionesta Scenic Area. The Twin Lakes Trail departs from the North Country Trail in the southern portion of the Scenic Area, and heads to Twin Lakes Recreation Area in Elk County. There is also a small loop trail system off Forest Road 133E that contains the Tionesta Short Loop (0.4 miles) and the Tionesta Long Loop (1.5 miles). This loop trail system is relatively flat with occasional wet places. It used to access the old fire tower that was destroyed in the 1985 tornado.

== See also ==
- List of old growth forests
