= Tionesta Creek =

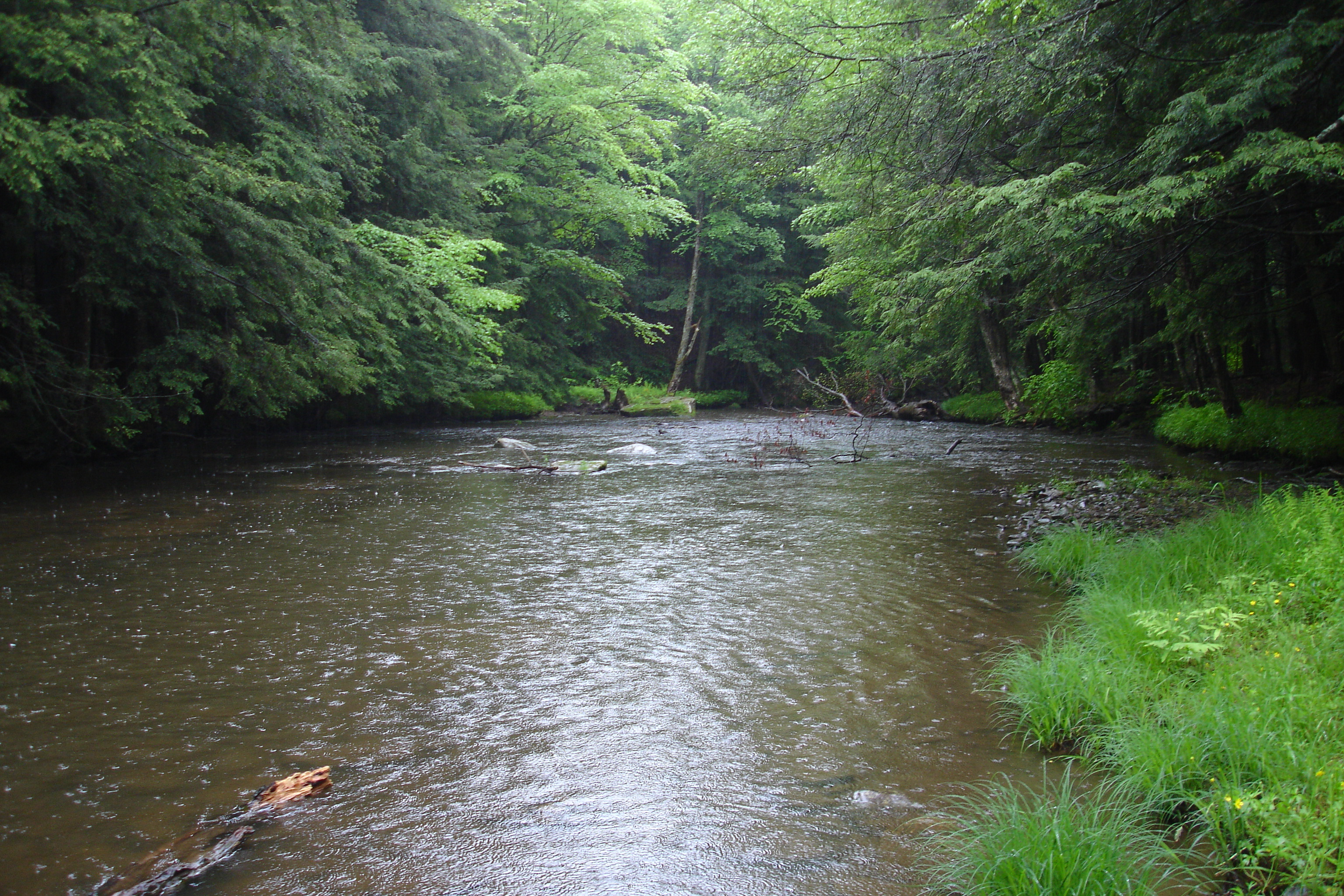
- The Tionesta Creek, deep in the Allegheny National Forest.

- Location of the mouth of Tionesta Creek in Pennsylvania

Location
- Country: United States
- State: Pennsylvania
- Counties: Warren, McKean, Elk, Clarion, Forest

Physical characteristics
- Source
  - location: Sheffield, Warren County, Pennsylvania
  - coordinates: 41°40′36″N 79°2′4″W
  - elevation: 1,925 ft (587 m)
- Mouth: Allegheny River
  - location: Tionesta, Forest County, Pennsylvania
  - coordinates: 41°29′15″N 79°27′24″W
  - elevation: 1,046 ft (319 m)
- Length: 61.9 mi (99.6 km)
- Basin size: 480 sq mi (1,200 km^{2})
- Discharge
  - location: Tionesta Creek Dam
  - average: 906 cu ft/s (25.7 m^{3}/s)

Basin features
- Progression: Allegheny River → Ohio River → Mississippi River → Gulf of Mexico
- River system: Allegheny River
- Tributaries
  - left: Mead Run, Thad Shanty Run, Watsontown Run, Rocky Run, Hastings Run, Wildcat Run, Blood Run, Logan Run, Phelps Run, Panther Run, Salmon Creek, Carpenter Run, Lamentation Run, Bear Creek, Little Coon Creek, Coon Creek, Piney Run, Johns Run
  - right: Rock Run, Duck Eddy Run, Pell Run, Messenger Run, Bush Creek, Martin Run, Reagan Run, Upper Sheriff Run, Fools Creek, Minister Run, Porcupine Run, Bobbs Creek, Little Minister Creek, Fork Run, Church Run, Ross Run, Jakes Run, Jug Handle Run, Sugar Run, Little Piney Run, Peters Run

Tionesta Creek is a tributary of the Allegheny River in Forest, Clarion, Warren, McKean, and Elk Counties in Pennsylvania in the United States. Together with its West Branch, Tionesta Creek is 61.9 miles (99.6 km) long, flows generally south, and its watershed is 480 square miles (1,243 km^{2}) in area.

== See also ==
- List of rivers of Pennsylvania
- List of tributaries of the Allegheny River
