= No-Name Island (Pennsylvania) =

Island in Pennsylvania

Coordinates: 41°31′06″N 79°26′42″W

No-Name Island is a 10-acre (40,000 m^{2}) alluvial island in the upper Allegheny River. It is located in Tionesta Township, Forest County, Pennsylvania, and is part of the Allegheny Islands Wilderness.

The island is a prime location for old growth, virgin, and river bottom forests.
