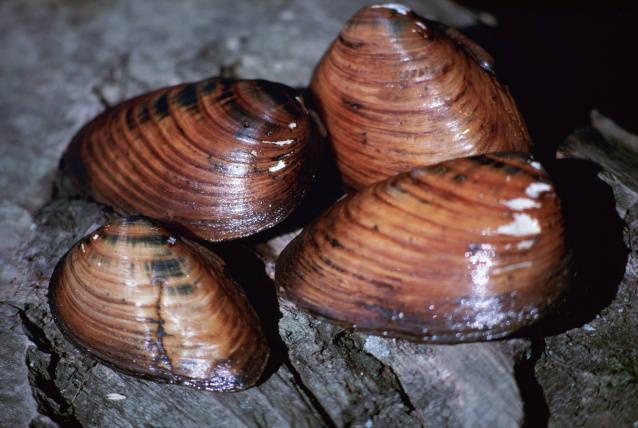

Conservation status
- Critically Endangered (IUCN 2.3)
- CITES Appendix II (CITES)

Scientific classification
- Kingdom: Animalia
- Phylum: Mollusca
- Class: Bivalvia
- Order: Unionida
- Family: Unionidae
- Genus: Pleurobema
- Species: P. clava

Binomial name
- Pleurobema clava (Lamarck, 1819)

= Pleurobema clava =

Species of bivalve

Pleurobema clava, the clubshell, club naiad or clubshell pearly mussel, is a species of freshwater mussel, an aquatic bivalve mollusk in the family Unionidae, the river mussels.

This species is endemic to the United States. It is a federally protected endangered species and is listed under Appendix I of the Convention on International Trade in Endangered Species of Wild Flora and Fauna.

Clubshells prefer clean, loose sand and gravel in medium to small rivers and streams, burying themselves in the bottom substrate to depths of up to four inches. Once settled in, clubshells are long-lived, living possibly up to 50 years. Clubshells are endangered, most likely because of agricultural run-off, industrial waste, mining of streams for gravel and sand, impoundment and the proliferation of the exotic invasive species the zebra mussel.

Prior to its endangered status, clubshells could be found in the Ohio, Cumberland, and Tennessee River systems, and Lake Erie drainages. Currently, however, these mussels can be found in the United States in the states of Illinois, Indiana, Kentucky, Michigan, New York, Ohio, Pennsylvania, Tennessee, and West Virginia. At the time of its listing under the Endangered Species Act of 1973 in 1993, P. clava was likely limited to no more than twelve rivers or streams.
