= Pleasant Township, Pennsylvania =

Township in Pennsylvania, United States

Coordinates: 41°44′30″N 79°09′59″W

Pleasant Township
- Township
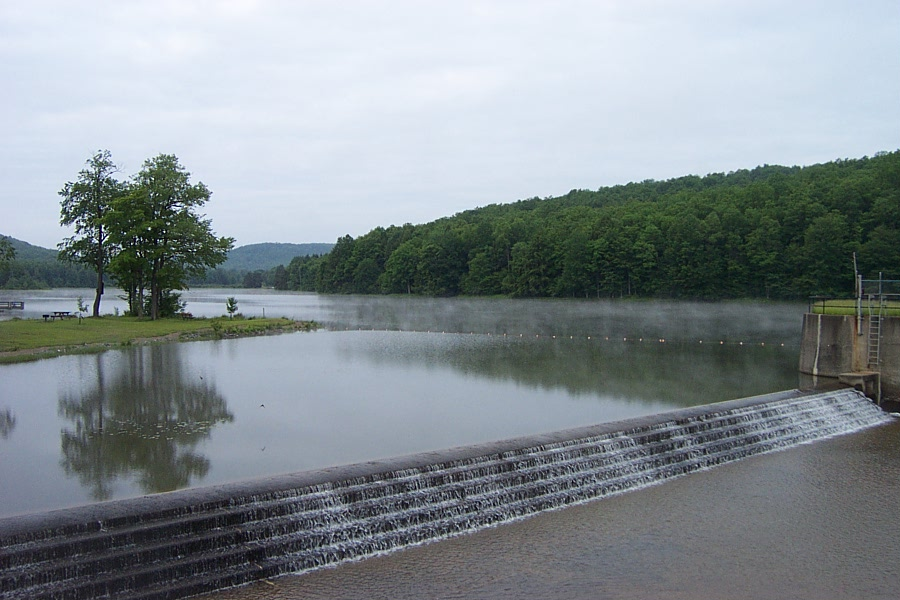
- Lake and dam at Chapman State Park

- Flag Logo

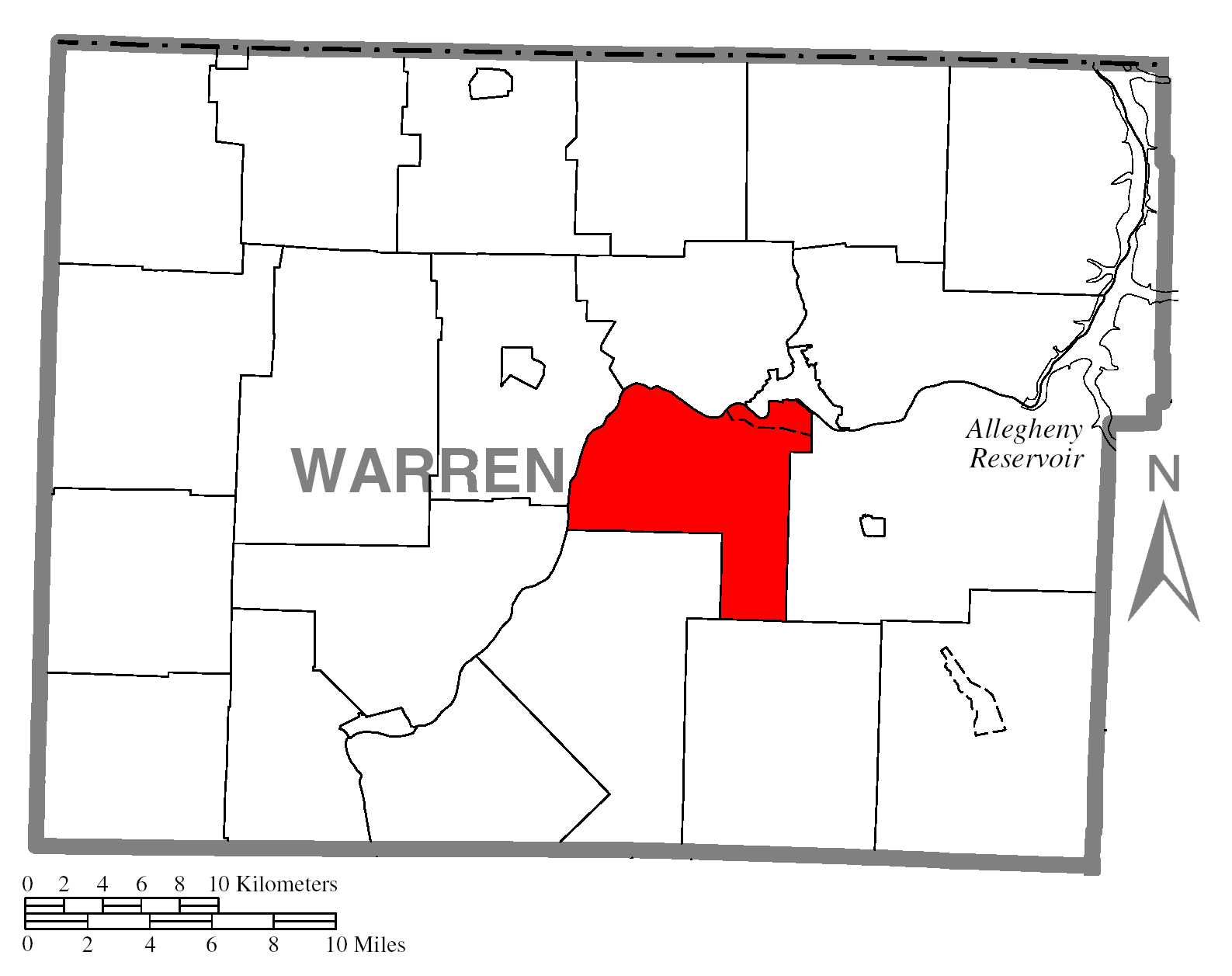
- Location of Pleasant Township in Warren County

- Location of Warren County in Pennsylvania
- Country: United States
- State: Pennsylvania
- County: Warren

Area
  - Total: 34.54 sq mi (89.45 km^{2})
  - Land: 33.69 sq mi (87.25 km^{2})
  - Water: 0.85 sq mi (2.20 km^{2})

Population (2020)
  - Total: 2,250
  - Estimate (2023): 2,200
  - Density: 69.8/sq mi (26.96/km^{2})
- Time zone: UTC-4 (EST)
  - Summer (DST): UTC-5 (EDT)
- Area code: 814
- FIPS code: 42-123-61208
- Website: https://pleasanttownship-warrenpa.org/

Pleasant Township is a township in Warren County, Pennsylvania, United States. The population was 2,250 at the 2020 census, down from 2,444 at the 2010 census.

== Geography ==
According to the United States Census Bureau, the township has a total area of 35.0 square miles (91 km^{2}), of which 34.3 square miles (89 km^{2}) is land and 0.7 square miles (1.8 km^{2}) (2.00%) is water.

== Demographics ==
Historical population
Census	Pop.	Note	%±
2000	2,528		—
2010	2,444		−3.3%
2020	2,250		−7.9%
2023 (est.)	2,200		−2.2%
U.S. Decennial Census

As of the census of 2000, there were 2,528 people, 1,032 households, and 729 families residing in the township. The population density was 73.7 people per square mile (28.5 people/km^{2}). There were 1,238 housing units at an average density of 36.1 per square mile (13.9/km^{2}). The racial makeup of the township was 98.81% White, 0.04% African American, 0.16% Native American, 0.24% Asian, 0.04% from other races, and 0.71% from two or more races. Hispanic or Latino of any race were 0.40% of the population.

There were 1,032 households, out of which 25.4% had children under the age of 18 living with them, 62.0% were married couples living together, 5.8% had a female householder with no husband present, and 29.3% were non-families. 25.6% of all households were made up of individuals, and 12.6% had someone living alone who was 65 years of age or older. The average household size was 2.34 and the average family size was 2.79.

In the township the population was spread out, with 19.8% under the age of 18, 4.4% from 18 to 24, 24.1% from 25 to 44, 28.4% from 45 to 64, and 23.3% who were 65 years of age or older. The median age was 46 years. For every 100 females there were 90.6 males. For every 100 females age 18 and over, there were 87.4 males.

The median income for a household in the township was $39,450, and the median income for a family was $48,636. Males had a median income of $37,105 versus $24,886 for females. The per capita income for the township was $20,731. About 4.1% of families and 5.1% of the population were below the poverty line, including 4.8% of those under age 18 and 1.3% of those age 65 or over.
