= Hearts Content Scenic Area =

Tract of old-growth forest in Warren County, Pennsylvania

- IUCN category V (protected landscape/seascape)
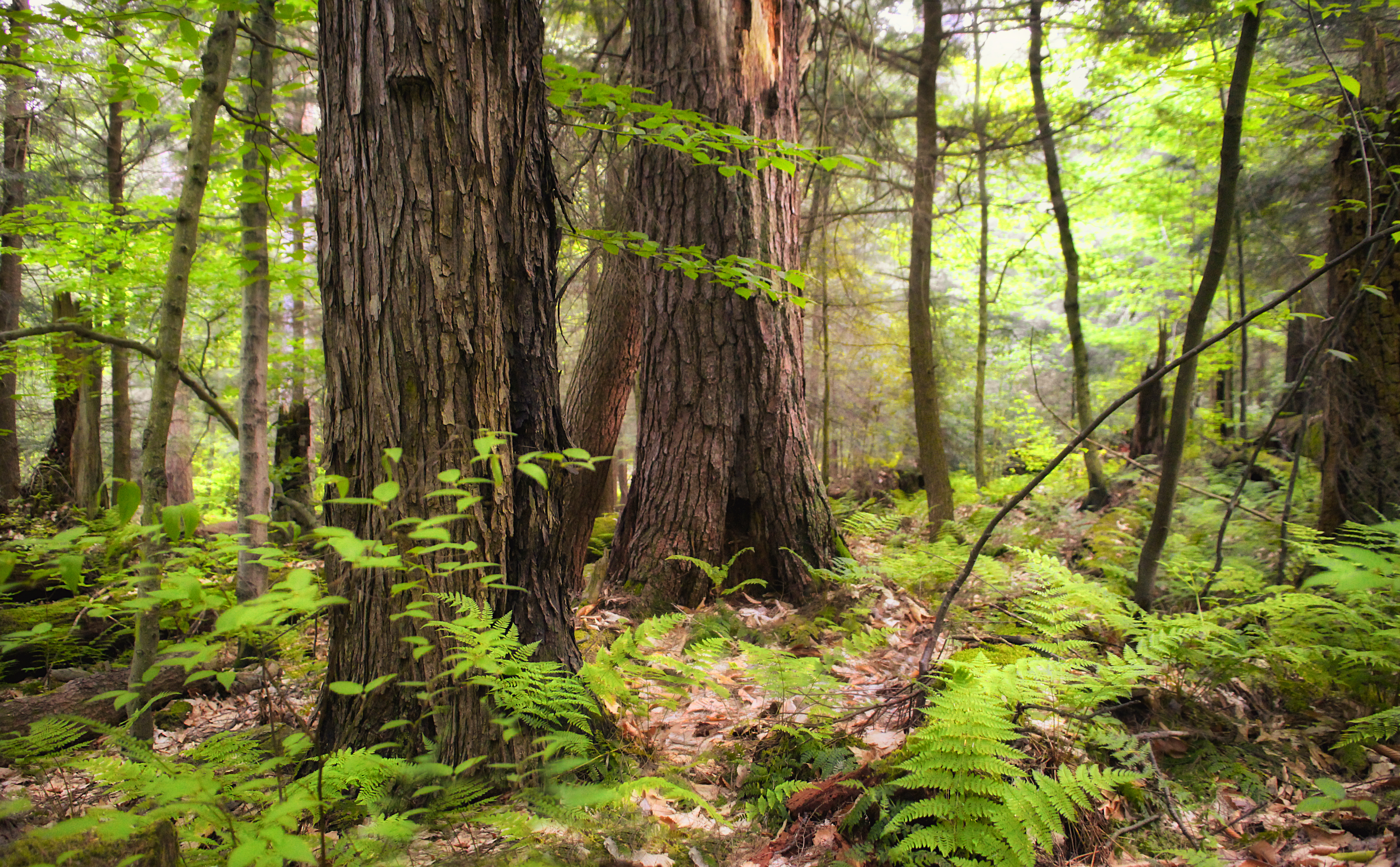
- Old-growth trees protected within Hearts Content Scenic Area.

- Location within Pennsylvania
- Location: Watson, Warren, Pennsylvania, United States
- Coordinates: 41°41′33.3″N 79°15′15.2″W
- Area: 120 acres (49 ha)
- Elevation: 1,893 ft (577 m)
- Established: 1934
- Named for: idiom "to one's heart's content"
- Operator: United States Forest Service

U.S. National Natural Landmark
- Designated: 1973

Hearts Content National Scenic Area is a tract of old-growth forest in Warren County, northwestern Pennsylvania. It represents one of the few remaining old-growth forests in the northeastern United States that contain white pine. The area is protected as a National Scenic Area within the Allegheny National Forest.

== History ==
While many of the region's forests were being clear-cut, the Wheeler and Dusenbury Lumber Company held the 20-acre (8.1 ha) tract of old-growth forest at Heart's Content from 1897 until 1922, when they deeded it to the United States Forest Service. In 1934, the Chief of the Forest Service recognized the old-growth stand and 102 acres (0.41 km^{2}) of surrounding land as a National Scenic Area. The forest became a National Natural Landmark in 1973.

== Scientific study ==
H.J. Lutz's 1930 study of Hearts Content was one of the earliest quantitative analyses of plant communities in an old-growth forest, and it remains influential in the field of ecology. Lutz concluded that the even-aged white pine stand established following a major disturbance in the 17th century, such as a fire (possibly set by Native Americans during the Beaver Wars); since then, the species has not reproduced under the closed canopy. By relocating and resampling Lutz's original plots, Whitney documented 50 years of changes in the structure and composition of the stand. During this time, dense deer populations have reduced the regeneration of many tree and herb species.

== Vegetation ==
Hearts Content represents E. Lucy Braun's hemlock-white pine-northern hardwood forest type. The old-growth forest is from 122 acres (49 ha) to 150 acres (61 ha) in extent, but the scenic area is most famous for its 20 acres (8.1 ha) of tall white pine and Eastern hemlock. Many of these trees have diameters of over 40 inches (102 cm) and heights of over 140 feet (43 m), and most of the white pine are between 300 and 400 years old. American beech is also plentiful in the forest, but is affected by Beech bark scale. Hay-scented fern covers much of the understory due to overbrowsing by deer.

== Recreation ==
Visitors can walk an easily accessible, 1-mile (1.6 km) loop trail through the old-growth forest. A picnic area, campground and several other trailheads are nearby. A 6.4-mile (10.3 km) cross-country ski trail passes through the area on old railroad grades. There are also numerous camps owned by private individuals in the area.

== See also ==
- List of National Natural Landmarks in Pennsylvania
- List of old growth forests
