= Allegheny National Forest =

National forest in Pennsylvania, United States

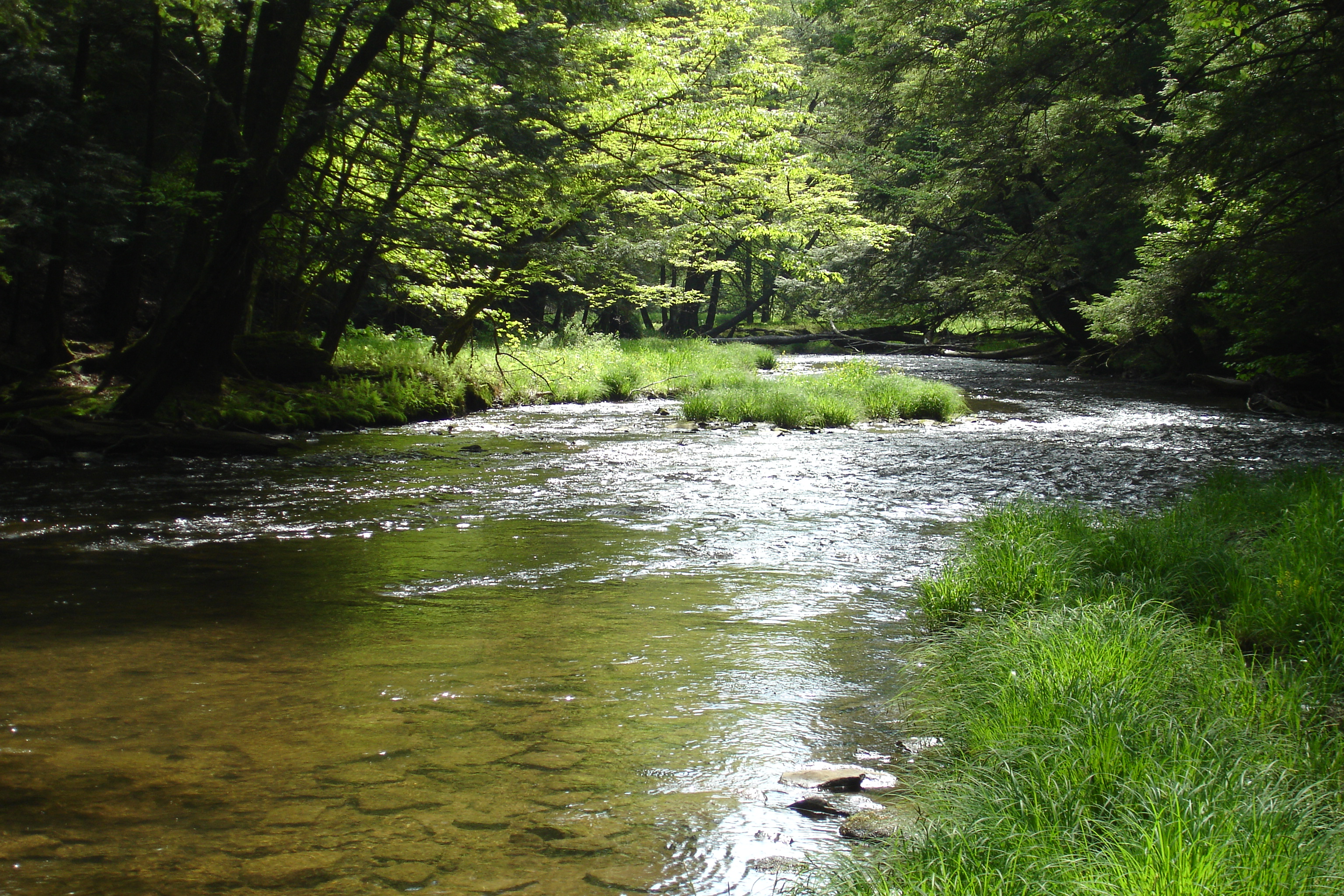
- Mead Run in the Allegheny National Forest

- Location within the United States
- Location: Warren, McKean, Forest, and Elk counties, Pennsylvania, USA
- Nearest city: Warren, Pennsylvania
- Coordinates: 41°39′11″N 79°2′5″W
- Area: 513,175 acres (2,076.75 km^{2})
- Established: September 24, 1923; 102 years ago
- Governing body: U.S. Forest Service
- Website: Allegheny National Forest

The Allegheny National Forest is a National Forest in Northwestern Pennsylvania, about 100 miles northeast of Pittsburgh. The forest covers 513,175 acres (801.8 sq mi; 2,076.7 km^{2}) of land. Within the forest is Kinzua Dam, which impounds the Allegheny River to form Allegheny Reservoir. The administrative headquarters for the Allegheny National Forest is in Warren. The Allegheny National Forest has two ranger stations, one in Marienville, Forest County, and the other in Bradford, McKean County.

The Allegheny National Forest lies in the heart of Pennsylvania's oil and gas region. It is only 40 miles (64 km) from the site of the first commercial oil well in the United States at Titusville, Pennsylvania. In 1981, about 17 percent of the state's crude oil production came from mineral rights owned by private individuals within the Forest boundary.

== History before 1923 ==
Today the Allegheny Plateau is known for black cherry, maple and other hardwoods, but two hundred years ago these species were less numerous. Today's forest is largely the result of two things: the exploitation of timber at the turn of the 20th century and being managed by the Forest Service since 1923.

=== 18th century ===
In the 18th century, the forest in northwest Pennsylvania was mostly Eastern Hemlock and American beech. Sugar maple, birch, chestnut, white pine, white oak and red maple were also common. White pine occurred in the original forest in relatively small, well-defined areas where it was typically accompanied by chestnut and to a lesser degree oak. Black cherry accounted for less than one percent of the plateau's trees. This old-growth forest contained rich, vibrant biodiversity, and was characterized by large trees, fallen logs, and a multi-layered forest canopy. Predation by the native eastern wolf (Canis lycaon) and eastern cougar (Puma concolor couguar) kept deer populations at naturally regulated low levels, estimated at ten deer per square mile. The understory vegetation was dense and richly diverse.

Disturbances such as tornado, blowdown, and ice storms were common events that created a random mosaic of small openings in the forest canopy across the landscape before human beings arrived to the North American continent. Later, Native Americans burned small areas of the understory of the forest in locations to improve berry and oak mast production, hunting, and ease of travel.

=== Early colonization ===
European settlers reached this area in the early 19th century. At first, trees were cut mostly to clear land for agriculture and provide timber for cabins and barns. Soon, the first commercial water-powered mills cut small amounts of lumber from selected pine, hemlock and large hardwoods. By 1840, portable steam engines made circular sawmills practical, and mills that could process 10,000 board feet (24 m^{3}) of lumber per day were common.

Tanneries that used hemlock bark as their source of tannin for curing leather began to appear in the late 1850s. This infant industry received a great boost by the Civil War demand for harness, military equipment and industrial belting. By the end of the century, the tanning industry was a major forest industry in Pennsylvania that used huge quantities of hemlock bark. The logs were removed later and sawn into lumber products.

=== 1850 to 1900 ===
Between 1850 and 1900, American society and technology changed in dramatic ways. People, moving West and in the growing cities in the East, demanded lumber to build homes, stores and furniture. Demand for paper and other wood pulp products increased. An eightyfold increase in coal production led to the need for more lumber for mine props, timbers, and planks. Band saws came into use after 1880, making possible the construction of huge mills capable of sawing 100,000 feet (30,000 m) or more of lumber per day. Railroads provided convenient transportation to consumers and markets. They also opened up extensive and previously inaccessible areas of timber with specialized locomotives such as the Shay which could traverse steep hillsides, uneven tracks and sharp curves. All of these factors supported large sawmill and tannery industries.

=== 20th century ===
By 1900, deer and their predators were almost eliminated due to overhunting. The Pennsylvania Game Commission began to restore the deer herd by importing deer from other states.

A new enterprise, the wood chemical industry, changed the course of forest development. Between 1890 and 1930, wood chemical plants produced charcoal, methanol, acetic acid, acetate of lime and similar products, and provided a market for virtually every size, species and quality of tree growing on the Allegheny Plateau. Harvests during this era were the most complete ever made in the area, clearing nearly every accessible tree of every size. The once vast forest of the Allegheny Plateau was almost completely removed, leaving barren hillsides as far as the eye could see.

Many large forest landowners in Pennsylvania and other northeastern states simply abandoned the land and moved West in search of new forests. The land left behind often ended up on delinquent tax rolls, prompting a financial crisis for rural counties. The bare soil and logging slash made floods and wildfires a constant danger.

==== 1911 ====
In 1911, the United States Congress passed the Weeks Act, allowing the federal government to buy land in eastern states for the establishment of National Forests. The Allegheny National Forest was established in 1923.

But with low deer populations, a new forest quickly grew. This forest was different from the previous one because conditions were now different. Shade-tolerant, long-lived trees like hemlock and beech gave way to sun-loving, shorter-lived species like black cherry, which readily germinated on the bare sunny ground. Cherry, red maple, black birch, and sugar maple became common species in the understory.

Today many of the Eastern National Forests are primarily second-growth and different in character from National Forests in the West created from huge reserves of largely virgin forest. In the Allegheny National Forest, the trees are roughly the same age because they started growing about the same time and the Forest Service continues to manage the land through a silvicultural system known as even-aged management—a practice very closely related to clearcutting.

== History after 1923 ==
An old-growth forest of hemlock and beech once stretched along northern Pennsylvania, but heavy logging between 1890 and 1930 left only pockets of that early forest in places like Hearts Content. Since the Forest Service began to manage the Allegheny National Forest in 1923, a different forest of hardwood trees like black cherry (that are more valuable as a timber product) was established through the use of herbicides and selective fertilizing. This weeded out the "undesirable" native trees while allowing the black cherry tree to thrive.

The Forest Service brought new concepts in forest management to the Allegheny Plateau, multiple benefits and sustainability. The Organic Act of 1897 introduced the National Forest mission: to improve the forest, provide favorable conditions for water flows, and furnish a continuous supply of timber to meet people's needs. On these lands, seedlings for tomorrow's forest are the focus of forest management activities. Watersheds are managed to ensure clear water for fisheries like trout and clean drinking water for all.

=== Conservation ===
Over time, various laws added other benefits like wilderness, heritage resources and grazing to the original idea of watershed protection and continuous timber. The Multiple-Use Sustained-Yield Act of 1960 recognized outdoor recreation, wilderness preservation, and habitat for wildlife and fisheries.

The National Forest set a goal using the motto "Land of Many Uses", to have a healthy, vigorous forest that provides wood products, watershed protection, a variety of wildlife habitats and recreational opportunities in a sustainable manner.

When the Allegheny National Forest was established in 1923, the immediate challenge was nurturing the young trees growing amongst logging slash on the recently cleared hillsides. Because of such heavy logging and mining, wildfires, floods and erosion were a threat. With care and a general absence of overt human interference and manipulation, the forests grew. Since they started growing at roughly the same time, most of the trees in today's second-growth forest on the Allegheny Plateau are the same age (70–100 years old).

=== 1900 to Present ===
Between 1900 and 1940, the young forest grew and evolved from openings to young forest to maturing forest.

Young forests offer diverse vegetation like seedlings, saplings, wildflowers and berries. Deer, grouse, songbirds and other wildlife thrive with the abundant food and cover. Rapidly growing trees soak up carbon, add much oxygen to the atmosphere, and protect soil. Taller trees shade streams, helping to regulate water temperature for aquatic life.

By the 1940s, the forest began to take on an appearance familiar to us today. The older trees provide acorns, cherries, and beech nuts for bear and turkey. Birds find sites for nests in the leafy tree crowns and plants like trillium prefer the filtered light of the maturing forest. In the 1940s, the Forest Service gradually resumed timber harvesting under strict research-based guidelines to ensure sustainability for future generations.

Abundant browse led to a dramatic increase in the deer population, which peaked in the 1940s and again in the late 1970s. Since the mid-1980s, the deer population has remained fairly constant, although at a level higher in many places than the forest can support.

Today the trees are mature and able to provide quality hardwood for furniture and other needs. Foresters deal with challenges like deer, insects, disease, drought and competing vegetation such as fern through research and careful management. A small percentage of the ANF, in select sections, will be left in its natural condition undisturbed by logging on a permanent basis, gradually progressing toward the biologically diverse old-growth condition.

This large region of Pennsylvania remains one of the least densely populated areas east of the Mississippi River.

== Forests and old growth ==
The Forest lies within the Allegheny Highlands forests ecoregion and about 90% of its area is covered in forests. The Forest contains some of the most extensive tracts of remaining old-growth forest in Pennsylvania, totaling thousands of acres. These include northern hardwood forests in Hearts Content Scenic Area and Tionesta Scenic and Research Natural Areas as well as riverine forests on Crull's and Thompson's Islands.

== Forest research ==
The Forest Service established a research station for the Northeast in 1923. Soon, research scientists were studying complex relationships among vegetation, animals, soil, nutrients, weather and disease. For decades, scientists have shared both research results and management guidelines based on these results with the ANF, other public and private landowners, and other scientists.

== Recreation ==
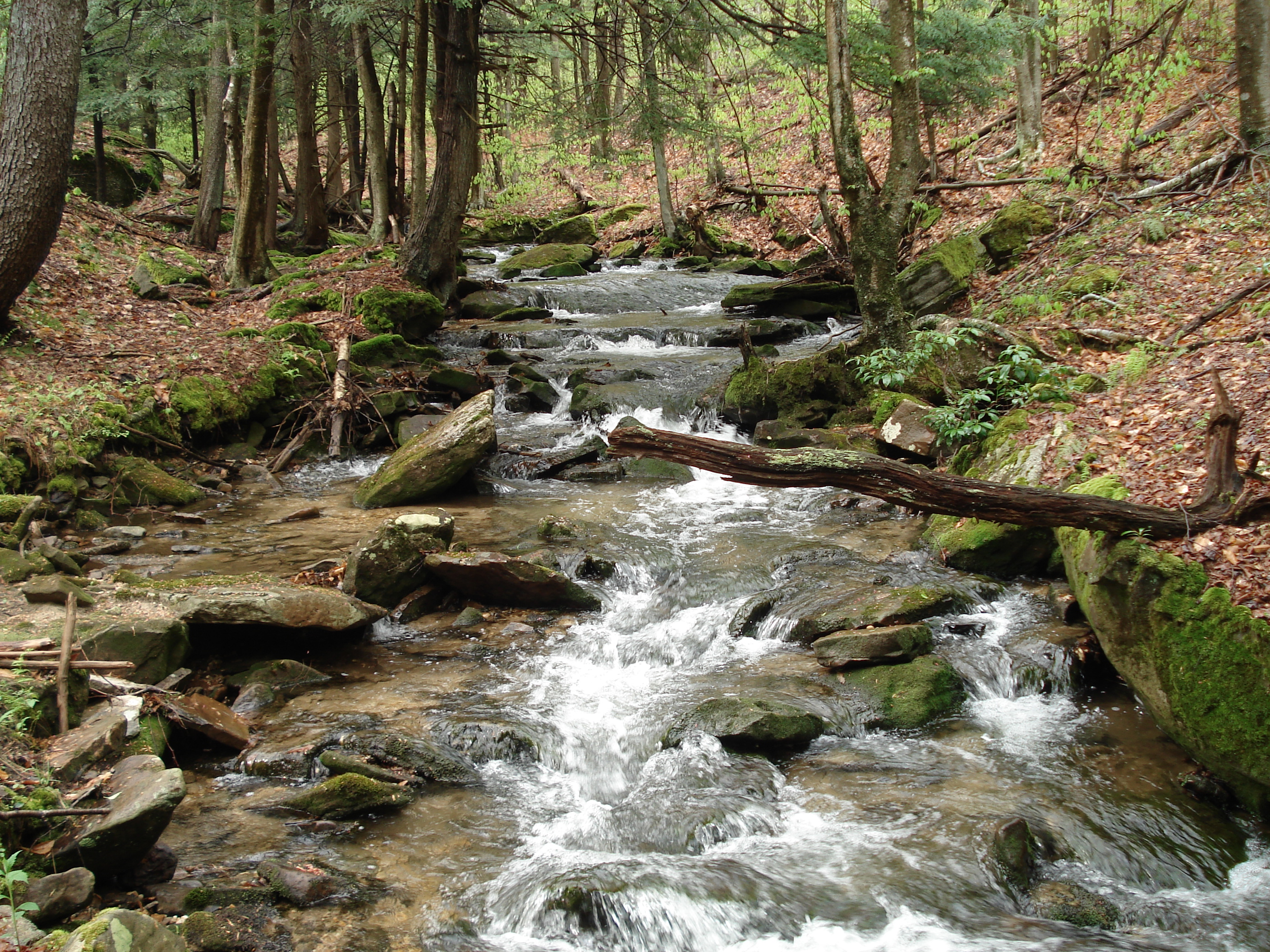
Minister Creek runs 11.8 miles (19.0 km) through Allegheny National Forest. A very popular hiking trail follows the creek.

During the 1920s, recreation on the ANF focused mostly on dispersed activities like hunting and fishing. In the 1930s, the Civilian Conservation Corps changed the face of National Forests across the country by building hundreds of recreation facilities, including Twin Lakes and Loleta Recreation Areas on the ANF. These and other facilities became popular after World War II when newly mobile families discovered the joys of outdoor recreation.

The creation of the Allegheny Reservoir when the Kinzua Dam was completed in 1965 brought the most dramatic change to developed recreation on the ANF. Within ten years, a tremendous development program resulted in campgrounds, boat launches, beaches, picnic areas, hiking trails and overlooks around the reservoir shoreline and elsewhere throughout the forest.

Over time, people's changing and more sophisticated expectations led to campground improvements like electricity, hot showers, and baby-changing stations. Areas to watch wildlife (Buzzard Swamp, Little Drummer), trails for cross-country skiing and motorized recreation (all-terrain vehicles, snowmobiles) and fully accessible fishing piers, trails and restrooms have been added, too. In 1984, President Ronald Reagan signed the Pennsylvania Wilderness Act into law, which designated the Hickory Creek Wilderness Area and Allegheny Islands Wilderness Area as part of the National Wilderness Preservation System.

== Multiple benefits, sustainability and the future ==
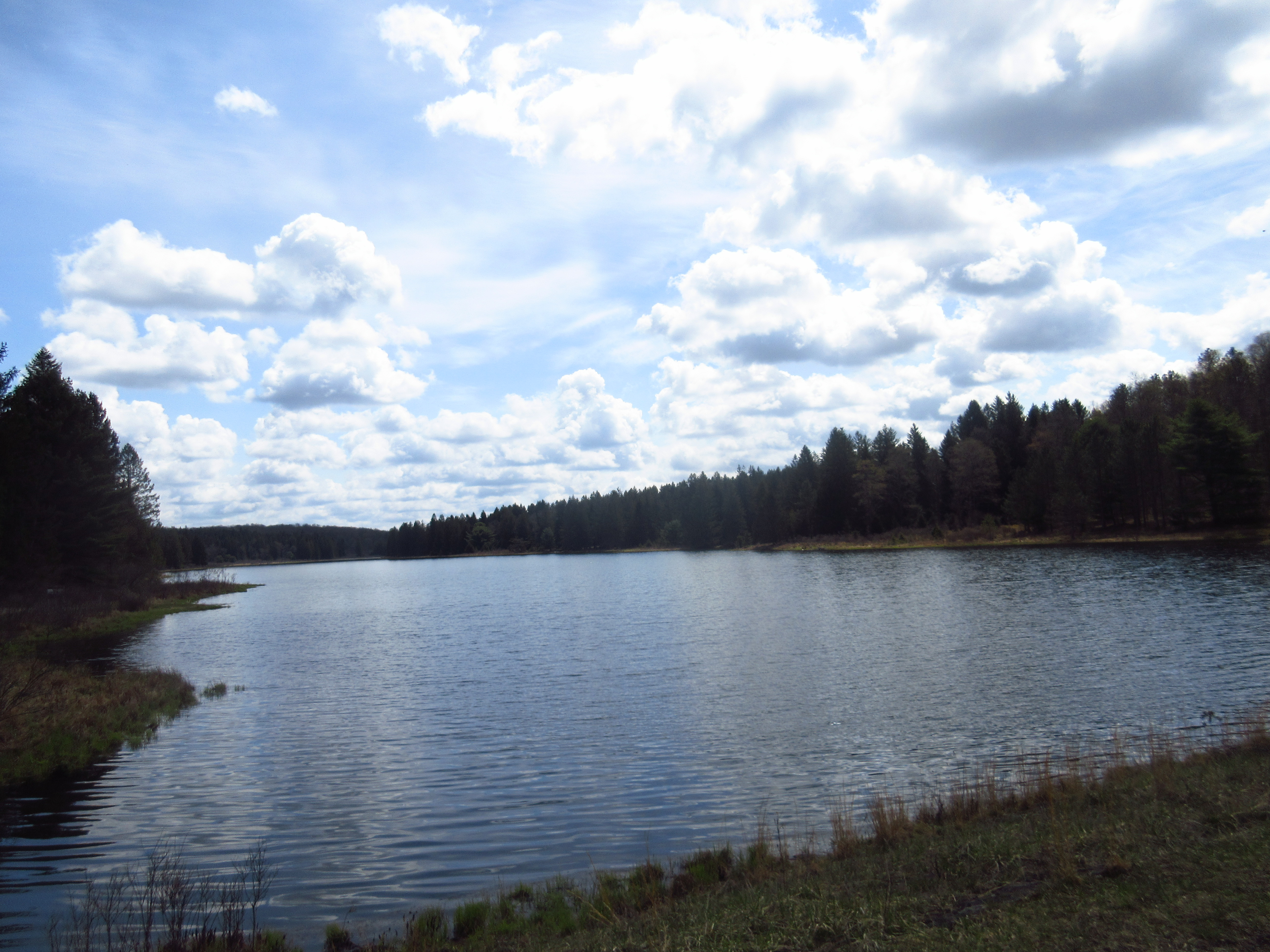
View of a lake from the Beaver Meadows Trail.

Today, the Forest Service carries out a variety of management and research activities, providing multiple benefits with a strong scientific basis.

Defining the way a National Forest is to be managed can be controversial. The National Forest Management Act of 1976 required each National Forest to implement a Forest Plan with extensive public involvement, outlining a vision for how and where management activities will be emphasized. The ANF's initial Forest Plan, which was approved in 1986, is currently undergoing revision. The revision process began in the fall of 2003, and was expected to be complete by early 2007. Additional parcels of the ANF are expected to be recommended to Congress for permanent protection as wilderness areas under the Wilderness Act of 1964 as a result of the Forest Plan revision process. (In a related connection, the Wilderness Act was authored in 1956 primarily by Howard Zahniser of The Wilderness Society, who grew up in the ANF town of Tionesta.)

== Conflict over oil and gas drilling rights ==
Recently a conflict has arisen in the Allegheny National Forest over mineral rights. In 1923 the land that is now the Allegheny National Forest was purchased by the Federal Government, but the federal government did not buy the subsurface or mineral rights of the land because of financial issues. Private citizens currently own ninety-three percent of the subsurface land in the forest. Since the spike in oil prices around 2000, oil companies that own mineral rights have placed more drilling equipment in the forest. During an out of court settlement in April 2009, the United States Forest Service decided that the National Environmental Policy Act will govern all oil and gas drilling in the forest. The National Environmental Policy Act will make any oil or gas drilling in the forest subject to public judgement. On June 1, 2009, the Minard Run Oil Co., Pennsylvania Oil and Gas Association, Allegheny Forest Alliance and Warren County Government filed suit in the United States District Court in Erie, Pennsylvania over the National Forest Service's use of the National Environmental Policy Act.

== See also ==
- List of national forests of the United States
- Pennsylvanian oil rush

== Sources ==
- USDA Forest Service – Allegheny National Forest – History
