= Credit freeze =

Voluntary lockdown of personal financial data

A credit freeze (also known as a security freeze) allows an individual to control how a consumer reporting agency (also known as a credit bureau such as Equifax, Experian, TransUnion, and Innovis) is able to sell personal financial identity data. The credit freeze locks the data at the consumer reporting agency until the individual gives permission for the release of the data.

Typically, consumer reporting agencies only develop such a feature when prompted to by legislation. In Canada, this has led to TransUnion and Equifax not offering any form of credit freeze (instead directing consumers to their paid identity monitoring services, which have been described as 'ineffective'), until the passage of Quebec's Bill 53, the Credit Assessment Agents Act.

Lifting a credit freeze requires a PIN. However, in September 2017, a security vulnerability in this system was identified: the PIN is in many cases guessable, and difficult or impossible to reset. Freezing one's credit will not prevent the credit score from changing. Existing companies with access to one's credit profile can still report positive and negative feedback on a credit profile, meaning if the credit profile is frozen, one's credit can still go up or down.

== Canada ==
The first jurisdiction in Canada to legislatively provide for credit freezes was Quebec, with the passage of Bill 53 (the Credit Assessment Agents Act). Starting in February 2023, Quebec residents can place a freeze. In February 2021, Ontario began considering changes to its Consumer Reporting Act that would provide for security freezes, and amended it in December 2023 via the Better for Consumers, Better for Businesses Act. The provisions for security freezes were brought into effect on July 1, 2026, and timeliness requirements for lifting a freeze will come into effect on July 1, 2027.

In October 2025, British Columbia passed Bill 28 (the Business Practices and Consumer Protection Amendment Act (No. 2)), which will mandate credit freezes upon coming into effect in August 2027.

== United States ==
All 50 states and the District of Columbia have a credit freeze law, the last state to pass such a law being Michigan in 2018.

The first state to pass a credit freeze law was California, with SB 1386 sponsored by Debra Bowen in 2002, effective 2003. In late 2007, all three of the major credit bureaus (following TransUnion's lead) announced that they would let consumers freeze their credit reports, regardless of the state of residency. State laws still apply, however, in instances where the cost or other details of the freeze are more favorable than they are under the industry-sponsored alternative.

Credit freezes are frequently viewed as the most effective way to prevent financial identity theft. Each year in the United States, approximately 15 percent of all cases of identity theft are cases of new account origination identity theft, according to the Federal Trade Commission. This form of identity theft occurs when a criminal opens credit in another individual's name. In the credit origination process, access to a credit report is critical for a lender to make a risk assessment. Because a credit freeze effectively stops any access to the credit report, it places a block in the process of issuing credit. Individuals who freeze their credit reports must therefore unfreeze their reports before they wish to apply for credit themselves. However, these can be avoided with proper preplanning. With proper documentation, most individuals should be able to unfreeze your credit scores with all three bureaus within 15 to 20 minutes. Generally, electronic unfreezing process takes effect immediately.

A credit freeze can also be placed on the credit file with The National Consumer Telecom & Utilities Exchange (NCTUE) in order to limit fraud through a bad actor creating a utilities account in some else's name.

=== Federal preemption of state laws ===
In 2018, the Economic Growth, Regulatory Relief, and Consumer Protection Act amended the Fair Credit Reporting Act to establish federal requirements for security freezes, including a requirement that nationwide consumer reporting agencies provide them free of charge. The provisions took effect on September 21, 2018, after which nationwide consumer reporting agencies could no longer charge consumers to place, temporarily lift, or remove a security freeze.

For requests to place a security freeze, nationwide consumer reporting agencies generally must place the freeze within one business day if the request is made by toll-free telephone or secure electronic means, or within three business days if the request is made by mail. A request to remove or temporarily lift a freeze generally must be completed within one hour if made by toll-free telephone or secure electronic means, or within three business days if made by mail.
