= Credit Environment India =

Credit Environment India is with Credit Information Companies Act getting passed by the Government of India in 2005, Credit Bureau formally got introduced to the country. CIBIL (Credit Information Bureau of India Limited) was established as the first credit bureau. TransUnion International Inc, one of the leading consumer credit bureaus in the world, is the major stake holder (27.5%) in CIBIL and provided the required platform to commence operations.

Today the lenders are able to take informed decisions while underwriting the credit applications. With the Reserve Bank of India (RBI) undertaking a host of measures to strengthen the credit environment, license to three other credit bureaus - Experian, Equifax and Highmark were extended and today country boast of 4 Credit Bureaus. In fact, 80% of loans sanctioned are to individuals with a credit score of 750 or above.

With over 150 Mio individuals’ data on these bureaus, it accounts for almost 25% of India's working population (taking factor into account that 50% of population is below 25) and is a milestone achievement considering only 7 years of operations for these bureaus.

Reserve Bank of India has continued to take necessary steps for strengthening the credit environment in India and the awareness about the importance of credit score has increased multi fold. With employers, prospect marriage match, property owners, schools etc. have started asking for the individuals to share their Credit score prior to decision is made. With risk based pricing in offing, the individuals with better credit score shall get rewarded and will not be required to subsidize the interest rates for defaulters. This has in fact led to establishment of credit repair business in India.

The credit environment is further going to strengthen with the telecom and insurance sector sharing the data of their customers with the credit bureaus and shall also increase the number of individuals’ records on the bureaus.

The country can expect a far transparent and robust credit mechanism and times to come and shall be instrumental in improvement of credit environment in India in short term.
