= Creditinfo =

Creditinfo Group
- Industry: Business services
- Founded: 31 January 1997
- Headquarters: London, United Kingdom
- Key people: Reynir Grétarsson (Founder & Shareholder); Satrajit Saha (CEO)
- Products: Credit Bureau, Credit scorecards, Decision support system,
- Number of employees: 400
- Website: www.creditinfo.com

Creditinfo is a global credit bureau and information services group with operations in more than 33 countries.

As of 2020 the company employs over 450 people with corporate headquarters in London, United Kingdom. The company was initially created in 1997 as Lánstraust ehf, later taking up the name Creditinfo.

== History ==
The sole founder of Lánstraust ehf was Reynir Grétarsson, with two other co-founders bringing their share capitals later the same year. One of these partners left after a few months, the other partner left after 3 years. In 2003, Lánstraust ehf was renamed and established as Creditinfo. In 2005, Graham Platts and two other former executives of Experian became shareholders in the company, buying a total of 17% of the shares. They remained shareholders until 2013, when the company itself bought back their share in the company, at that time 31,5%.

In 2009, Creditinfo and Schufa signed a contract and created Creditinfo SCHUFA GmbH. This cooperation was terminated in 2011 due to conflicts of interest. In March 2012, Creditinfo established the first licensed credit bureau in Jamaica. In February 2013, Creditinfo signed an agreement to provide credit bureau software to Da Afghanistan Bank, and in June 2013, Creditinfo was granted a full operation licence to the Bank of Tanzania.

Creditinfo Group is listed in "Doing Business 2013" publication issued by World Bank and International Finance Corporation.

== Notable acquisitions ==
The acquisitions of ICECREDITINFO and Upplýsingaþjónustan in 1998 eliminated all the existing Icelandic competition. In 2004, Creditinfo acquired a media monitoring service called Fjölmiðlavaktin. In 2015, Creditinfo acquired Credit Bureau in Morocco from Experian. In August 2015, Creditinfo acquired Krediidiinfo in Estonia from Experian. In August 2016, Creditinfo acquired VisualDNA’s Credit and Risk business from Imagini.

Creditinfo operates in the business-to-business sector selling consumer credit reports and related analytics.

== Countries of Operation ==
=== Subsidiaries ===
- Creditinfo Guyana

== See also ==
- Experian
- Compuscan
- Credit bureau
- TransUnion
