= Consumer Data Industry Association =

Trade association in the United States

Consumer Data Industry Association Inc
- Abbreviation: CDIA
- Formation: Tax-exempt since
- Type: 501(c)(6)
- Headquarters: Washington, DC
- Revenue: 6,484,634 USD (2023)
- Expenses: 6,038,716 USD (2023)
- Website: cdiaonline.org

The Consumer Data Industry Association (CDIA) is the trade association for the various consumer reporting companies in the United States. It represents around 200 consumer data companies that provide fraud prevention and risk management products, credit and mortgage reports, resident and employment screening services, check fraud and verification services, and collection services to individuals and companies. The nationwide consumer reporting companies Equifax, Experian and TransUnion are among its members.

CDIA works with state and federal legislative and regulatory bodies, the media, lenders and others on educational outreach efforts dealing with consumer credit, collections and risk assessment. It also cosponsors a biennial international conference on credit reporting with the European Association of Consumer Credit Information Suppliers.

== History ==
The Association was founded in 1906, in Rochester, New York. Originally named the National Association of Retail Credit Agencies, it came about in response to the growing demands of consumers for credit coupled with the increased mobility of Americans. This led to credit grantors wanting more consistent and standardized credit information on consumers so they could better determine their credit payment history.

In 1907, the organization changed its name to the National Association of Mercantile Agencies (NAMA). Following World War I, NAMA became Associated Credit Bureaus of America. ACB of A, which was originally formed in 1912 as the Retail Credit Men's National Association, emphasized credit education, research and the exchange of credit payment and collection data among its members. It also established the first uniform system for reporting credit data after World War II.

Automation in the consumer reporting industry began in the 1960s as computer systems began to replace the manual methods of keeping records of credit data. By the end of the decade, virtually all credit histories were accessed in this way.

The rapid expansion of credit during this period led ACB of A to formulate “Policies to Protect Consumer Privacy”, a set of consumer rights and standards by which all its members had to abide. These Policies later served as a model for the first federal law regulating the consumer reporting industry, the Fair Credit Reporting Act. The FCRA went into effect on April 25, 1971.

In the mid 1960s, the Association changed its name once again, to Associated Credit Bureaus, Inc. to reflect the growing international nature of its service. It also moved its offices to Washington, DC in 1991 as it recognized the importance of being close to the legislative and regulatory center of the country.

The next decade saw the Association’s members create businesses that adapted to the rapidly changing consumer-centric economic environment. Credit reports, while still a large part of the business, were no longer the sole product now being issued by its members. Data was now being collected, collated and disseminated for mortgage granting purposes. Security concerns drove many employers to now seek out employment reporting and background screening products. For the same reason, individuals and companies who rented property were purchasing reports to ensure the safety of their residents. Check verification and loss prevention services were also part of the industry.

As a result, the Association was renamed the Consumer Data Industry Association in 2001. It now represents those companies whose business practices center around the management and analysis of consumer credit data.
