= Credit bureau =

Consumer borrowing and bill-paying history tracking agency

A credit bureau is a data collection agency that gathers account information from various creditors and provides that information to a consumer reporting agency in the United States, a credit reference agency in the United Kingdom, a credit reporting body in Australia, a credit information company (CIC) in India, a Special Accessing Entity in the Philippines, and also to private lenders. It is not the same as a credit rating agency.

== Description ==
A consumer reporting agency is an organization providing information on individuals' borrowing and bill-paying habits. Such credit information institutions reduce the effect of asymmetric information between borrowers and lenders, and alleviate problems of adverse selection and moral hazard. For example, adequate credit information could facilitate lenders in screening and monitoring borrowers as well as avoiding giving loans to high risk individuals. Lenders use this to evaluate credit worthiness, the ability to pay back a loan, and can affect the interest rate and other terms of a loan. Interest rates are not the same for everyone, but instead can be based on risk-based pricing, a form of price discrimination based on the different expected risks of different borrowers, as set out in their credit rating. Consumers with poor credit repayment histories or court adjudicated debt obligations like tax liens or bankruptcies will pay a higher annual interest rate than consumers who don't have these factors. Additionally, decision-makers in areas unrelated to consumer credit, including employment screening and underwriting of property and casualty insurance, increasingly depend on credit records, as studies have shown that such records have predictive value. At the same time, consumers also benefit from a good credit information system because it reduces the effect of credit monopoly from banks and provides incentives for borrowers to repay their loans on time.

In the U.S., consumer reporting agencies collect and aggregate personal information, financial data, and alternative data on individuals from a variety of sources called data furnishers with which the reporting agencies have a relationship. Data furnishers are typically creditors, lenders, utilities, debt collection agencies (credit bureaus) and the courts (i.e. public records) that a consumer has had a relationship or experience with. Data furnishers report their payment experience with the consumer to the credit reporting agencies. The data provided by the furnishers as well as collected by the bureaus is then aggregated into the consumer reporting agency's data repository or files. The resulting information is made available on request to customers of the consumer reporting agencies' for the purposes of credit risk assessment, credit scoring or for other purposes such as employment consideration or leasing an apartment. Given the large number of consumer borrowers, these credit scores tend to be mechanistic. To simplify the analytical process for their customers, the different consumer reporting agencies can apply a mathematical algorithm to provide a score the customer can use to more rapidly assess the likelihood that an individual will repay a particular debt given the frequency that other individuals in similar situations have defaulted. Most consumer welfare advocates advise individuals to review their credit reports at least once a year to ensure they are accurate.

In addition to providing credit information, these services have become authoritative sources of identity information against which people can be verified using an identity verification service and knowledge-based authentication.

== Canada ==
In Canada, there are two credit bureaus (also known as credit reporting agencies): Equifax Canada and TransUnion Canada. They are private companies that collect information about a consumer’s credit accounts, payment history, and other information such as debts sold to a collection agency, and bankruptcies.

Credit bureaus in Canada gather this information from lenders and creditors who report it to them. However, it’s important to note that not all lenders and creditors report to the credit bureaus, some may only report information to one, while others may report to none. Other sources like collection agencies and public records information are also reported to the credit bureaus.

These credit reporting agencies are regulated by the governments on a provincial and territorial level. Most provinces in Canada have their own credit reporting legislation in place that dictates how credit reporting agencies may share consumer information. There's also a federal legislation called the Personal Information Protection and Electronic Documents Act (PIPEDA) that must be abided by the credit reporting agencies.

Credit bureaus share consumer information in the form of a credit report to third parties with whom a consumer has given permission to. This includes banks, credit unions, lenders, credit card companies, and even landlords. These third parties use their credit report to help them make decisions about the consumer, such as whether to approve for a loan or credit card.

== India ==
Credit Information Bureau (India) Limited (CIBIL), India's first Credit Information Bureau was established by the Reserve Bank of India to improve the functionality and stability of the Indian financial system by containing non-performing assets (NPAs) while improving credit grantors' portfolio quality. CIBIL was founded in the year Aug 2000.

CIBIL is now promoted by TransUnion International Inc. (TransUnion) to provide comprehensive credit information by collecting, collating and disseminating credit information, pertaining to both commercial and consumer borrowers, to a closed user group of members.

RBI approved three other credit bureaus in 2010 – CRIF High Mark (earlier High Mark), Equifax and Experian. The consumer credit scores in India range from 300 to 900.

High Mark launched India's first micro finance bureau in early 2011 and today operates the world's largest micro finance bureau besides offering traditional bureau services for the Retail lending industry. CRIF High Mark is India’s first full-service credit bureau serving all borrower segments – Retail, Agri & Rural, MSME, commercial and Microfinance.

== Iran ==
Iran Credit Scoring (ICS) Company is the sole licensed national consumer reporting agency offering credit information services to respective members in Iran. ICS is a private equity company established in 2006, by all Iranian banks (private and public banks) and other financial institutions such as leasing and insurance companies, operating in the Islamic Republic of Iran within the context of the banking act and regulations issued by Iran Ministry of Economic Affairs and Finance, and Central Bank of Iran.

The main objective of ICS is to help credit providers make improved lending decisions quickly and more objectively. To achieve this, ICS aggregates credit related information among participating members to provide credit providers with a more complete risk profile of the customer (natural persons, unincorporated entities, corporate entities or any other entity). Participating members disclose credit related information to and obtain information from the CRA to assess the credit worthiness of their existing and prospective customers, which enhances the credit providers risk assessment capabilities to determine whether or not the customer is likely to repay.

== Pakistan ==
The Electronic Credit Information Bureau (CIB) was established by the State Bank of Pakistan (SBP) in December, 1992. Under section 25(A) of the Banking Companies Ordinance (BCO), 1962, the SBP mandates that all financial institutions in Pakistan including banks, developmental financial institutions (DFIs) and micro finance banks (MFBs) are required to use the eCIB software for monitoring credit reports. SBP controls updates to the database, updates the reports and monitors the software. All member financial institutions are required to submit entire borrowers' records online to eCIB every month within two weeks after the end of the month.

Aquitas Information Services (AISL) under the brand name TASDEEQ is the first licensed private Credit Bureau in Pakistan.

== Philippines ==
In 1981, Ferdinand Marcos, then President of the Republic of the Philippines, issued a Letter of Instructions No. 1107 mandating the Central Bank of the Philippines to analyze the probability of establishing and funding the operation of a credit bureau in the Philippines due to the disturbing increase of failures on corporate borrowers.

In adherence to the order, Central Bank of the Philippines organized the Credit Information Exchange System under the department of Loans and Credit. It was created to engage in collating, developing and analyzing credit information on individuals, institutions, business entities and other business concerns. It aims to develop and undertake the continuing exchange of credit data within its members and subscribers and to provide an impartial source of credit information for debtors, creditors and the public. This will also cooperate and guide government agencies in their credit information requirements.

On April 14, 1982, Credit Information Bureau, Inc. was incorporated as a non-stock, non-profit corporation. (See: Presidential Decree No. 1941 [7])

In 1982, Credit Information Bureau, Inc. was established through the power of Presidential decree 1941 and created under Central Bank of the Philippines, now Bangko Sentral ng Pilipinas (BSP) department of Loans and Credit, the Securities and Exchange Commission (SEC) and the Financial Executives Institute of the Philippines (FINEX); to initiate a credit information exchange system in the country.

In 1997, Credit Information Bureau, Inc. was incorporated and transformed into a private entity and became CIBI Information, Inc.

In 2008, Republic Act No. 9510 also known as Credit Information System Act of 2008 gave way to the creation of Credit Information Corporation as the new government-owned and controlled credit registry in the country.

In 2011, TransUnion Information Solutions, Inc. begins operations in the Philippines, partnering with Bank of the Philippine Islands (BPI), Banco de Oro Unibank (BDO), Metrobank Card Corporation, HSBC and Citibank Philippines to launch the country's first comprehensive, international private credit bureau.

Contributing TransUnion members are given access to credit information in the form of a credit report, consumer bureau score and additional value-added services. TransUnion Philippines aims to strengthen the Philippine financial system through increased access to credit for borrowers and reduced risk to lenders.

== Saudi Arabia ==
The Saudi Credit Bureau (SIMAH) is the first and sole licensed national credit bureau offering consumer and commercial credit information services to respective members in the Kingdom of Saudi Arabia. It was established in 2002 and began operating on the ground in 2004 under the supervisory umbrella of Saudi Arabian Monetary Agency (SAMA), currently known as the Saudi Central Bank.

The idea goes back into 1998 when national commercial banks and SAMA thought of establishing a Saudi credit bureau offering consumer and commercial information. Meetings were held for this purpose and officials were assigned to coordinate with the World Bank to consider existing international experiences for some countries to establish a credit bureau based on methodological and knowledge approaches to contribute to the Saudi national economy.

SIMAH was then established to operate within the context of the current banking act and regulations issued by SAMA.

== United Kingdom ==
=== Credit Reference Agencies ===
In the United Kingdom, the Credit Reference Agencies are Experian, Equifax and TransUnion.

Most banks and other credit-granting organisations subscribe to one or more of these organisations to ensure the quality of their lending. This includes companies which sell goods or services on credit such as credit card issuers, utility companies and store card issuers. Subscribing organisations are expected to provide relevant data to maintain the common data pool.

Credit reference agencies are bound by the Data Protection Act 2018, which requires that data relating to identifiable individuals must be accurate, relevant, held for a proper purpose and not out-of-date, and gives individuals the legal right to access data held on them. Credit agencies are therefore required under law to provide an individual with a copy of their consumer credit report upon request. Most agencies also provide online services for ongoing access to reports.

=== Consumer Credit Act (1974) ===
The activities of Credit Reference Agencies are governed by the Consumer Credit Act 1974.

=== Fraud prevention services ===
In addition to mainstream credit reference agencies, specialised fraud prevention services such as Cifas, National Hunter and Synectics Solutions are also active on the UK market.

Fraud prevention services focus on the prevention of fraud, money laundering and other types of financial crime. They have faced criticism in the media. Allegations have been made of such services being opaque, operating intransparent appeals processes, and false positives resulting in consumers losing access to bank accounts, employment and their homes.

== United States ==
=== History ===
Following the Panic of 1837, the first commercial credit reporting organizations formed. By the 1850s, coded reference books were available to wholesalers, merchants, banks, and insurance companies that subscribed. In 1875, typed reports replaced handwritten ledgers for storage and retrieval. By the end of the 1880s, surveillance of retail customers existed in major urban centers.

By the late 1890s, credit management was professionalizing, with retailers and bureau operators systematizing creditworthiness categories. During the early 20th century, stores interviewed, documented, and tracked customers in 35,000 credit departments.

Credit spending exploded during the 1910s and 1920s. By the 1920s, credit managers mined customer information for targeted sales promotions. During the 1930s, automobile, finance, petroleum, and direct sales companies sought standardized credit reports and pricing from the more than 1,000 credit bureaus. An antitrust petition was filed in 1933.

More flexible card files and widespread telephone usage made credit rating books obsolete. A teletype report took one minute to send, versus five minutes on the telephone.

In 1965, the first computerized bureau went online, starting the automation and consolidation of consumer credit reporting. Credit reports contained probing details about personality, habits, and health. In the hearings on the 1970 Fair Credit Reporting Act lawmakers were troubled that individuals were helpless to clear up errors. In the 1960s, credit scoring was widely adopted.

=== Consumer reporting agency ===
In the United States, there is no legal term for a credit bureau under the federal Fair Credit Reporting Act (FCRA). A consumer reporting agency is often abbreviated in the industry as CRA.

In the United States, key consumer reporting agency consumer protections and general rules or governing guidelines for both the consumer reporting agencies and data furnishers are the federal Fair Credit Reporting Act (FCRA), Fair and Accurate Credit Transactions Act (FACTA), Fair Credit Billing Act (FCBA), and Regulation B.

Two government bodies share responsibility for the oversight of consumer reporting agencies and those that furnish data to them. The Federal Trade Commission (FTC) has oversight for the consumer reporting agencies. The Office of the Comptroller of the Currency (OCC) charters, regulates, and supervises all national banks with regard to the data they furnish consumer reporting agencies.

Most U.S. consumer credit information is collected and kept by the four national traditional consumer reporting agencies: Experian (formerly TRW Information Systems & Services and the CCN Group), Equifax, TransUnion, and Innovis (which was purchased from First Data Corporation in 1999 by CBC Companies). These organizations are for-profit businesses and possess no government affiliation. Though they are competitors, they are members of a trade organization called the Consumer Data Industry Association (CDIA) to establish reporting standards and lobby on behalf of their industry issues in Washington. Current reporting standards accepted by the four U.S. CRAs are Metro and Metro2. The Metro2 standard is defined in the annual CDIA publication, the Credit Reporting Resource Guide. Consumers are entitled to a free annual credit report from each of the three nationwide consumer reporting agencies, Equifax, Experian and TransUnion. AnnualCreditReport.com is maintained by all three companies.

There are dozens of other similar information collection and reporting firms that analyze and sell information about consumers for other purposes, including those who aggregate multiple credit data sources and provide lenders with customized analytical tools. Furthermore, there are also non-traditional credit reporting agencies.

PRBC (Payment Reporting Builds Credit, Inc.) is a national alternative credit bureau. Incorporated in March 2002, PRBC enables consumers to self-enroll and build a positive credit file by reporting their on-time payments (such as rent, utilities, cable, and phone) that are not automatically reported to the three traditional credit bureaus.

In the U.S., there are six business or commercial bureau repositories:

- Cortera
- Dun & Bradstreet
- Experian Business
- Equifax Commercial
- PayNet
- Southeastern Association of Credit Management (SACM)

While not a credit reporting agency, Small Business Financial Exchange, Inc. (SBFE) is a trade association for small business lenders from all types of industries. SBFE gathers and protects small business payment data for its members to help build a true and accurate picture of small business then facilitates the exchange of that data to specific business credit reporting agencies that have a Certified Vendor licensing agreement with SBFE. SBFE only allows business credit reporting agencies to license its members' data for risk management purposes, marketing use of the data is not allowed by SBFE.

=== Tort liability for business defamation ===
In the case of Dun & Bradstreet, Inc. v. Greenmoss Builders, Inc., 472 U.S. 749 (1985) the U.S. Supreme Court held that a consumer reporting agency may be liable if it was careless in reporting an impending or past bankruptcy filing of a business that is not a public figure.

== Controversy ==
In the United States, a percentage of credit reports provided by consumer reporting agencies contain inaccuracies. According to the U.S. General Accounting Office (GAO), common causes of errors broadly fall into one of two categories: inclusion of incorrect information and exclusion of correct information. Reasons for the inaccuracies include consumers providing inaccurate information to the consumer reporting agencies; incorrect or incomplete data input by furnishers, or failing to provide data to the consumer reporting agency; and incorrect or incomplete data (or data applied to the wrong consumer) by the consumer reporting agency. According to Avery, Calem, and Canner in Credit Report Accuracy and Access to Credit, "the parties that bear the costs of correcting errors or providing more timely and complete information [data furnishers and consumer reporting agencies] may not receive much benefit from the improvement in accuracy."

The formula to calculate consumer credit scores by a consumer reporting agency is proprietary and considered a trade secret of the agency in the United States.

Some consumer reporting agencies in the United States provide two credit scores - an 'educational' score to the consumer and a customary FICO-like score to the lender or business. Liz Weston writes that some consumer advocates refer to these other [educational] credit scores as "FAKO scores" (a play on acronym of FICO). In consideration of the fact that algorithms which rate people are used in a discriminatory fashion to deny people legal rights (employment, insurance, credit, etc.), those very algorithms act as law. The law says that if one does "this" or if one "does" that, then they will be afforded different treatment and opportunities. What needs to be done though remains a secret. Therefore, people are called on to abide by a secret law. At least two things need to be examined: First is that the operation of a more general "chilling effect" that imposing a non disclosed law may have and; Secondly the social effects of discrimination, which take an entirely new light in the context of no longer discriminating against race, creed, color, age, or religion, but on the basis of a number, a number which has been assigned to all members of society reflecting information about that person which is unknown. Accordingly, there can be no definition at present of what information credit repositories collect or even what the use of that information is or what it reflects. These questions can only be answered if the algorithms were publicized and expert statisticians were permitted to examine them and improve on the intent of the model, which intent is also undisclosed.

According to David Szwak, a partner in Bodenheimer, Jones & Szwak which specializes in insurance law and litigation against consumer reporting agencies, some consumer reporting agencies in the United States maintain a VIP database of special consumers such as members of Congress, judges, actors and celebrities. The VIP database is specially administered by the bureau, which ensures the credit report of the consumer is accurate and not negatively handled. The database exists because individuals in the VIP database could cause significant problems for the bureaus, including negative publicity and legislative action which could adversely affect the industry. So far an economic model to describe this industry has not been attempted, while the fundamentals are counter intuitive to any market known, since other industries (finance, banking, insurance) sponsor consumer reporting agencies to process information while consumers pay CRAs to receive that information. The utility of the consumer is hard to calculate since the consumer is given no recourse to correct mistakes processed about them, hence the dynamics of this triangle involving consumers, credit reporters, and sponsoring industries remain undefined.

== Business credit reporting agencies ==
Commercial credit reporting and scoring bureaus also exist and can be used to evaluate the likelihood of a business paying creditors. Examples of commercial credit reports are the Paydex score from Dun & Bradstreet, the solvency score from Infolegale, the Risk Rating from Creditsafe, the Experian Intelliscore, the CPR Score from Cortera, the GCS score from Global Credit Services, SkyMinder service from CRIF and the CIC Score and NACM National Trade Credit Report from the National Association of Credit Management. TransUnion, Equifax, and Rapid Ratings International are also examples of commercial credit reporting agencies.

== List of credit reporting agencies ==
Country	Major CRAs
Andorra	Ram.ad
Angola	Bureau - Central Privada de Informação de Crédito
Argentina	Nosis Credit Bureau, Veraz Equifax
Armenia	Armenian Credit Reporting Agency (ACRA)
Australia	CreditorWatch, Compuscan, illion, Experian, Tasmanian Collection Service, Equifax
Azerbaijan	Azerbaijan Credit Bureau (ACB)
Bahrain	BENEFIT
Benin	Creditinfo
Bhutan	Credit Information Bureau of Bhutan
Botswana	Compuscan, TransUnion
Brazil	Quod, SPC Brasil, Boa Vista Serviços, Serasa Experian
Canada	Equifax Canada, TransUnion Canada
Cape Verde	Creditinfo
Chile	Dicom Equifax, TransUnion, Siisa, Sinacofi
Colombia	Experian, TransUnion
Costa Rica	TransUnion
Czech Republic	CRIF
Denmark	Experian
Dominican Republic	Data-Crédito, TransUnion
Ecuador	Equifax, Acredita
Egypt	I-Score
Ethiopia	Compuscan
El Salvador	TransUnion
Georgia	Creditinfo
Germany	Creditreform, Bürgel, SCHUFA, Boniversum
Guatemala	TransUnion
Guyana	Creditinfo
Honduras	TransUnion
Hong Kong	TransUnion
Iceland	Creditinfo
India	TransUnion CIBIL, CRIF High Mark, Experian & Equifax
Indonesia	CRIF
Ireland	Creditinfo
Iran	https://www.irancreditscoring.com/ iran credit scoring
Italy	CRIF
Ivory Coast	Creditinfo, Finedatta Africa Ltd
Jamaica	Credit Information Services Ltd, Creditinfo, CRIF
Japan	Teikoku Databank, Tokyo Shoko Research, Risk Monster, Creditsafe K.K.
Jordan	CRIF
Kazakhstan	Creditinfo
Kenya	Creditinfo, Metropol, [TransUnion]
Latvia	Creditinfo
Lithuania	Creditinfo
Lesotho	Compuscan
Malaysia	Experian, Credit Bureau Malaysia, CTOS Data Systems, FIS Data Reference, Dun & Bradstreet, One Future Solutions, MyData Infomatica, CTOS Basis, MARC Data, CRIF OMESTI
Mali	Creditinfo
Malta	Creditinfo
Mexico	Equifax, TransUnion
Morocco	Creditinfo
Mozambique	Compuscan
Namibia	Compuscan
New Zealand	Equifax, illion, Centrix
Netherlands	Experian
Nicaragua	TransUnion
Niger	Creditinfo, Finedatta Africa Ltd
Nigeria	CreditRegistry, FirstCentral Credit Bureau, CRC Credit Bureau
Norway	Experian
Oman	Mala'a
Panama	APC Buro
Pakistan	eCIB
Peru	Equifax, Xchange Peru
Philippines	CIBI Information, Inc., Compuscan, TransUnion Information Solutions. Inc.
Poland	Polish Credit Bureau "BIK"
Romania	Creditinfo
Russia	CRIF
Rwanda	Finedatta Africa Ltd
Saudi Arabia	SIMAH, Bayan Credit Bureau
Senegal	Creditinfo, Finedatta Africa Ltd
Singapore	Experian, Credit Bureau (Singapore)
Slovak Republic	CRIF
South Africa	Compuscan, Experian, TransUnion, LexisNexis
South Korea	National Information & Credit Evaluation(NICE), Korea Credit Bureau(KCB)
Spain	RAI (companies only); ASNEF-Equifax and BADEXCUG-Experian (consumers)
Switzerland	Zentralstelle für Kreditinformation, Crif
Taiwan	Joint Credit Information Center(JCIC)
Tajikistan	CRIF
Tanzania	Creditinfo, Dun & Bradstreet
Thailand	National Credit Bureau
Togo	Creditinfo, Finedatta Africa Ltd
Turkey	KKB
Uganda	Creditinfo, Finedatta Africa Ltd
Ukraine	Creditinfo
United Arab Emirates	Al Etihad Credit Bureau
United Kingdom	Experian, Equifax, TransUnion, Creditsafe Group (business only), Aire
United States	Experian, FICO, Equifax, TransUnion, Innovis, PRBC, Aire

== See also ==
- Credit circle
- Credit history
- Credit risk
