= Medical information =

Medical information may refer to:

- Medical record, individual
- Health information, general

== See also ==
- Medical information on Wikipedia
- Medical Information Bureau, a membership corporation owned by insurance companies in the United States and Canada
- Medical Information Technology (disambiguation)
