= Mumbai Fintech Hub =

Success

- Mumbai Fintech Hub's Logo
- Abbreviation: MFH
- Formation: 2018
- Headquarters: Mumbai, Maharashtra, India
- Region served: Mumbai Metropolitan Region
- Fields: Fintech
- Key people: Aseemkumar Gupta, IAS (Chairman); Jayashree Bhoj, IAS (Managing director)
- Parent organization: Government of Maharashtra
- Website: fintech.maharashtra.gov.in

The Mumbai Fintech Hub is an investment platform, which was started by the Government of Maharashtra in the Mumbai Metropolitan Region. It is an initiative by the Government of Maharashtra to promote the fintech ecosystem in the state of Maharashtra.

== History and overview ==
Mumbai Fintech Hub was founded in 2018 as an initiative to promote fintech startups by the Government of Maharashtra. The accelerator programme was inaugurated by CM Devendra Fadnavis.

The programme was launched in a partnership with National Payments Corporation of India (NPCI), PayU, Fino Payments Bank, IndusInd Bank, IndiaFirst Life Insurance Company, SBI General, HannoveRe, Swiss Global Enterprise, CRIF High Mark, Microsoft, HDFC Bank, British High Commission and Monetary Authority of Singapore, Deloitte]], NASSCOM, Indian Venture Capital Association (IVCA), and Payments Council of India (PCI), among others.

Sh. SVR Srinivas, IAS was the Chairman of the Mumbai FinTech Hub. Sh. Neeraj Arora, Partner Deloitte was the lead advisor. An advisory board and steering committee represented by the reputed members of the FinTech industry was also established. In December 2018, it received 200 applications among which 13 startups were shortlisted. Some of the companies/startups who were selected under the programme are Crelytics, Bonfleet, One Wallet, Huepay, Phi Commerce, GoPlannr, M2P, Microchip Payments, Monitree, Riskcovry, Finlok, FinVu and News4Use.
