= Grétarsson =

Grétarsson is an Icelandic patronym, meaning son of Grétar. Notable people with the last name include:

- Arnar Grétarsson (born 1972), Icelandic football manager and former footballer
- Daníel Leó Grétarsson (born 1995), Icelandic footballer
- Helgi Grétarsson (born 1977), Icelandic chess grandmaster
- Hilmar Grétarsson (born 1982), Icelandic journalist
- Hjörvar Steinn Grétarsson (born 1993), Icelandic chess grandmaster
- Reynir Grétarsson (born 1972), Icelandic businessman
- Sigurður Grétarsson (born 1962), Icelandic football manager and former footballer
