= Credit reference =

Organisation that provides an indivitual's past credential record

A credit reference is information, the name of an individual, or the name of an organization that can provide details about an individual's past track record with credit. Credit rating agencies provide credit references for companies while credit bureaus provide credit references for individuals.

Other letters of credit reference might be written by banks, which would provide basic information about how long the applicant has held an account, what type of account it was, and whether there were any overdrafts or late payments noted.

Individuals and companies can carry out credit checks on businesses in order to assess their credit worthiness

== How credit references are used ==
Credit references are used to help lenders quantify the risk of lending to a given applicant or to determine overall creditworthiness. For example, if an applicant's credit history indicates proper, timely payments on all outstanding obligations, a lender may judge it more likely that the applicant will make timely payments on the requested loan. Your credit references show as credit tradelines on your credit reports. Whats known as credit tradelines is also known as credit references.

Whether the credit reference is a good one depends on if the payments have been made on time or not. The credit limit and payment history in the credit references give other potential creditors an idea on whether an individual will make payments on time or default. Credit references also determine if an individual's credit score.

A good credit score is typically a score of 700 and above but, creditors do have their own underwriting guidelines.

== See also ==
- Credit
- Credit risk
- Consumer credit risk
- Default (finance)
- Reference
- Credit score
