= Experian, Singapore =

Experian Credit Services Singapore Pte Ltd
- Formerly: DP Information Group
- Type: Private
- Founded: Singapore, (1978; 48 years ago)
- Headquarters: Singapore
- Key people: James GOTHARD General Manager, Credit Services and Strategy SEA, Experian
- Products: Credit & information Services; Credit Bureaux; Lead Generation; Customer Acquisition; Portfolio Monitoring; Debt Collection; SME Advisory; Research Services
- Revenue: (2007)
- Parent: Experian
- Website: https://www.experian.com.sg

Experian Credit Services Singapore Pte Ltd (formerly DP Information Group). It is a Singapore credit and business information bureau formed in 1978.

As of 2007, it was considered the largest provider of credit and business information in Singapore. It was fully acquired in 2008 and now operates as Experian.

== History ==
DP Information Group was started by private individuals in 1978. Forty percent of it was acquired by Experian in October 2008. In late 2014 the company was fully acquired by Experian and rebranded to Experian in 2019.

== Products ==
Experian helps organisations lend responsibly and protect themselves and their customers from risk. Through Experian Bureaux, Experian collects and analyses credit histories of over one billion people and businesses globally—sorting through information about the credit they applied for, whether the applications were successful, and how they paid the credit back.

Facilitated by their one-stop portal, Experien compiles and collects public information sourced from the Accounting and Corporate Regulatory Authority (ACRA), Singapore Courts, and other sources. This information is reported to businesses, such as financial institutions, law firms, and government agencies. Decision-makers across multinational corporations and small and medium enterprises rely on their comprehensive database to make critical and time-driven decisions, particularly regarding lending.

Experian develops credit rating and credit scoring models. Its custom credit ratings model for Singapore companies, based on a regression methodology; it is currently being used by Building and Construction Authority to evaluate top-tier construction companies.

Since 1986, the company has published the “Singapore 1000 & SME 500” (as of 2008, “Singapore 1000 & SME 1000”), an annual ranking of Singapore's most successful companies and small and mid-sized firms by financial performance. In recent years, it also started an annual companion ranking called the “Singapore International 100,” recognising Singapore's largest companies by overseas revenue.

The company operates an SME advisory business, DP SME Advisory, which helps local and foreign entrepreneurs set up their business in Singapore. It helps new enterprises with business services such as filing for licenses and corporate secretarial services, etc.

== Partnerships ==
Experian has a partnership with RAM Holdings Berhad, a bond rating agency in Malaysia to set up RAM Credit Information Sdn Bhd, headquartered in Kuala Lumpur, Malaysia. It provides similar credit and business information for the Malaysian market.

== Related Companies ==
- Experian Credit Services Singapore Pte Ltd
- Experian Credit Bureau Singapore Pte Ltd
- DP Management Pte Ltd
- RAM Credit Information Sdn Bhd (Malaysia)
