= TransUnion LLC v. Ramirez =

- Supreme Court of the United States

Argued March 30, 2021 Decided June 25, 2021
- Full case name: TransUnion LLC, v. Sergio L. Ramirez
- Docket no.: 20-297
- Citations: 594 U.S. 413 (more)

Holding
- Only plaintiffs concretely harmed by a defendant’s statutory violation have Article III standing to seek damages against that private defendant in federal court.

Court membership
- Chief Justice John Roberts Associate Justices Clarence Thomas · Stephen Breyer; Samuel Alito · Sonia Sotomayor; Elena Kagan · Neil Gorsuch; Brett Kavanaugh · Amy Coney Barrett

Case opinions
- Majority: Kavanaugh, joined by Roberts, Alito, Gorsuch, Barrett
- Dissent: Thomas, joined by Breyer, Sotomayor, Kagan
- Dissent: Kagan, joined by Breyer, Sotomayor

Laws applied
- Fair Credit Reporting Act

TransUnion LLC v. Ramirez, 594 U.S. 413 (2021), was a United States Court case dealing with standing in federal cases under Article III of the Constitution related to class-action suits against private defendants. In a 5–4 decision, the Court ruled that only those that can show concrete harm have standing to seek damages against private defendants in federal court.

== Background ==
Sergio Ramirez had been in the process of purchasing a new car in 2011 and, as typically done, had his credit rating reviewed by the dealership. Using the credit rating agency TransUnion, his name was checked not only against financial databases but alongside a list maintained by the federal Treasury Department's Office of Foreign Assets Control (OFAC) of known terrorists and other known criminals that would be illegal to conduct business with. As his name matched one of those on the OFAC's list - but otherwise had no relation to the known criminal - the dealership told him this in front of family members and refused to sell him the car. Ramirez asked TransUnion for copies of his credit report, which still indicated that Ramirez was considered a potential criminal. Eventually, TransUnion distinguished Ramirez's credit record as unconnected to the OFAC list.

Ramirez filed suit against TransUnion in the United States District Court for the Northern District of California in 2012, asserting that TransUnion's means of using simple name matching to the OFAC list violated the Fair Credit Reporting Act, which was created to allow victims of false credit reporting to seek remedies. Ramirez sought and obtained class-action status for his suit, with 8,184 other individuals that similarly had been matched against the OFAC list due to sharing a name and who had been notified by TransUnion. A jury trial awarded the class damages of $60 million in 2016, though on appeal to the Ninth Circuit in 2020, the damages were reduced to $40 million. During both the jury trial and at appeal, TransUnion objected to the validity of the class-action suit under the Fair Credit Reporting Act, claiming that the class members had not shown demonstrable harm and thus lacked Article III standing to bring suit. However, the courts rejected TransUnion's argument.

== Supreme Court ==
TransUnion petitioned to the Supreme Court on the question of the class standing. The Court granted certiorari for the case in December 2020, and oral arguments were held on March 20, 2021.

The Supreme Court handed down its decision on June 25, 2021. In a 5–4 decision, the Court reversed the Ninth Circuit and remanded the case for further review. The majority opinion was written by Justice Brett Kavanaugh and joined by Chief Justice John Roberts and Justices Samuel Alito, Neil Gorsuch, and Amy Coney Barrett. The majority found that of the class members, only 1,853 - those whose credit reports had been shared with third-party businesses - had shown any, physical, monetary, or various intangible harms including reputational harm to have Article III standing under the Fair Credit Reporting Act. Kavanaugh wrote "Only those plaintiffs who have been concretely harmed by a defendant’s statutory violation may sue that private defendant over that violation in federal court." In addition, the court found that only Ramirez had a right to sue for damages with regard to two other claims, both stemming from allegations that TransUnion's mailings were improperly formatted, since none of the other plaintiffs had shown that they had even opened the mailings.

Justice Clarence Thomas wrote a dissent which was joined by Justices Stephen Breyer, Sonia Sotomayor and Elena Kagan. Thomas wrote that the courts had long favored injuries for violations of "private rights" that would have allowed the class-action lawsuit to proceed, but stated "Despite Congress’s judgment that such misdeeds deserve redress, the majority decides that TransUnion’s actions are so insignificant that the Constitution prohibits consumers from vindicating their rights in federal court." Justice Kagan also wrote a dissent, joined by Breyer and Sotomayor. Kagan agreed on Thomas' conclusion and said the majority opinion "transforms standing law from a doctrine of judicial modesty into a tool of judicial aggrandizement". However, Kagan stated that the Supreme Court had previously concluded in Spokeo, Inc. v. Robins that one must show specific harm to have standing, though in practice, the situation would still resolve in the same manner as Thomas outlined.

The Court’s ruling has drawn significant academic criticism for its narrow interpretation of standing in privacy cases. The Court's approach, according to privacy scholars, not only contradicts Congress’s intent in enacting statutory privacy protections but also reflects a historical misunderstanding of standing doctrine. Scholars also critique the ruling for exacerbating inconsistencies in standing doctrine by failing to provide courts with a coherent framework for recognizing privacy harm. Scholars have generally argued that the decision undermines privacy law enforcement by limiting private rights of action, which are crucial for holding corporations accountable for privacy violations, as it shields corporations from liability for privacy violations unless plaintiffs can demonstrate immediate and tangible harm, a standard that fails to account for the broader implications of data misuse.
