= ATI Global =

ATI Global is an Australian company that owns several legal software companies including Infotrack, LawConnect, and Sympli. The company generated more than $1.25 billion in sales financial year 2024 and over $350 million in earnings.

== History ==
ATI Global was founded by Christian Beck in 1992.

On 31 May 2018, it was announced that ASX and ATI Global founded Sympli as a 50:50 partnership.

In January 2021, ATI Global acquired UK company Groundsure. In November 2021, it was announced that LawLytics was acquired by ATI Global.

In July 2025, it was reported that Regal Partners owned a stake in ATI Global through their Global Small Companies Fund.

== Companies ==
ATI Global owns the following companies:

- Groundsure
- Smokeball
- LawY
- Infotrack
- LawConnect
- Sympli
- LawLytics
- CreditorWatch
