= Public Credit Registry =

Indian digital financial registry

Public Credit Registry (PCR), created by the Reserve Bank of India, is a public digital registry to capture and store financial information of borrowers in India, both existing and new borrowers. The credit registry will collate the borrowing history of both individuals and corporate borrowers. Borrowers will have access to their credit information and seek corrections.

== History ==
The PCR is the culmination of recommendations given by the committee headed by Y.M. Deosthalee. The idea behind creating the public registry is to collate the financial information of individual and corporate borrowers under one platform, inclusive of financial delinquencies, pending legal suits, and willful defaulters. The objective was to strengthen the credit culture of the Indian economy.

The move is a departure from the existing mechanism where there are multiple credit information repositories with varied data objectives and coverage. The lack of credit information gap will be filled by the unified PCR. The data contained in the system will be made available to stakeholders such as banks and private financial institutions on a need-to-know basis.

It was suggested that the PCR would improve India's ease of doing business parameters at the World Bank.
