= TransUnion CIBIL =

Indian credit bureau

TransUnion CIBIL Limited
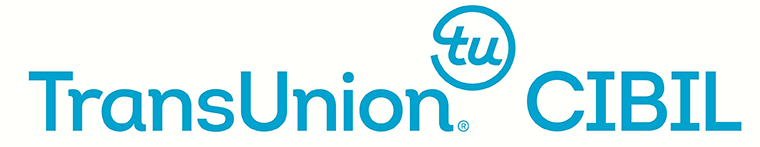
- Formerly: Credit Information Bureau (India) Limited
- Type: Credit Information Company
- Founded: Mumbai, Maharashtra, India (August 2000; 26 years ago)
- Headquarters: One Indiabulls Centre, Tower 2A-2B,19th Floor, Senapati Bapat Marg, Lower Parel, Mumbai, Maharashtra, India
- Area served: India
- Key people: Bhavesh Jain (Managing Director & CEO)
- Services: Research, Risk and Policy Advisory

TransUnion CIBIL Limited is a credit information company operating in India. It maintains credit files on 600 million individuals and 32 million businesses. TransUnion is one of four credit bureaus operating in India and is part of TransUnion, an American multinational group.

== Consumer credit reporting ==
Trans Union CIBIL aggregates consumer borrowing and payment information for the purpose of assessing loan risk and pricing credit (setting the interest rate). It has partnered with Chicago-based TransUnion.

Consumer credit scores are also used in unemployment decisions, although there are no studies in India showing that impaired credit leads to employee misconduct and unemployment.

== Business credit reporting ==
TransUnion CIBIL aggregates business financial and payment information for the purpose of assessing loan risk and pricing credit (setting the interest rate. It has partnered with New Jersey–based Dun and Bradstreet. D&B maintains files on 150 million business worldwide.

== CIBIL full form ==
CIBIL is fully known as Credit Information Bureau (India) Limited

== What is CIBIL score? ==
CIBIL score is a bank's assessment of a client's trustworthiness based on information from their credit history. The higher the score, the more favourable the bank is to the client. It is a 3-digit number ranging between 300 and 900. Ideally, 720 or above score considered as a good CIBIL score. It tells your financial health and your previous records of loans.

However, a good cibil alone does not guarantee a loan. Banks generally refer to credit tradelines (or DPD- days past due). If there are recent delays/overdue, loan might still be rejected even if score is above 720.

== CRIF vs. CIBIL ==
Banks and financial organisations widely use CRIF and CIBIL. Both of them are more or less the same. Here's a comparative analysis of CRIF and CIBIL

CRIF Credit Scores:

300–500	Very low
500-650	Low
650–750	Great
750-900	Excellent

CIBIL Credit Scores:

<600	Low
600-649	Difficult
650-699	Possible
700-749	Good
750-900	Excellent

Higher CIBIL scores make your loan journey easier. They also help you secure lower interest rates on your unsecured loans. Your CIBIL score is affected by your loan history. It is influenced by various factors such as past settlements of loans or credit cards, delayed payments or overdue amounts, and unpaid loans. If your CIBIL score is low, it becomes harder to obtain any type of loan. However, CIBIL scores can be improved, though this process usually takes about 4–8 months. To achieve a good CIBIL score, it is crucial to pay your EMIs and credit card bills on time.

== Competition ==
Competitors to TransUnion CIBIL include:

- CRIF High Mark
- Equifax
- Experian

== History ==
- 2000: CIBIL (Credit Information Bureau (India) Limited) incorporated.
- 2004: Credit bureau services are launched in India (Consumer Bureau).
- 2006: Commercial bureau operations commenced.
- 2007: CIBIL Score, India's first generic risk scoring model for banks and financial institutions, was introduced.
- 2010: Two firsts for the credit industry in India with the launch of:
  - CIBIL Detect: India's first repository for information on high-risk activity.
  - CIBIL Mortgage Check: The first centralized database on mortgages in India.
- 2011: CIBIL Score is made available to individual consumers.
- 2016: Transunion acquired 92.1% stake in CIBIL to become Transunion CIBIL.
- 2017: TransUnion CIBIL launches CIBIL MSME Rank to drive credit penetration in Micro, Small and Medium Enterprises and helping lenders assess risk better
- 2017: Bank of India sold its 5% share in the company for Rs190.6 crore, implying a value of US$592 million for TransUnion CIBIL
