= AdTruth =

Software product

AdTruth is a software product and the digital media division of 41st Parameter, a company headquartered in Scottsdale, Arizona, with regional offices in San Jose, California; London, England; and Munich, Germany. AdTruth allows marketers to recognize and reach target audiences across online devices.

AdTruth software identifies users for targeting, tracking, performance tracking across digital media, including mobile and desktop, by analysing patterns in large numbers of advertisements served over the internet, rather than through the use of cookies.

== History ==
AdTruth was founded in 2011 by Ori Eisen of 41st Parameter, to repurpose the company's fraud detection and prevention technology, for use within the advertising industry to accurately target intended audiences, particularly in mobile. Eisen was joined by James Lamberti in the role of vice president and general manager. In 2012 41st Parameter raised $13 million in Series D financing from Norwest Venture Partners, Kleiner Perkins Caufield & Byers, Jafco Ventures and Georgian Partners, bringing total funding to about $35 million.

In May 2012, AdTruth hosted a meeting of digital media executives to discuss Apple’s UDID deprecation, with the intent of developing a device-neutral replacement standard.

AdTruth joined the World Wide Web Consortium's Tracking Protection Working Group, which provides guidance for implementing and adhering to Do Not Track policies. AdTruth also worked with privacy firm Truste to create a privacy compliant Do Not Track-style mechanism for mobile.

In 2013, the company Experian purchased 41st Parameter, acquiring AdTruth as part of the deal.

== Product ==
AdTruth software helps marketers track, target and retarget consumers using more than 100 parameters, including milliseconds in differences in the internal clock setting, to recognize a particular device anonymously. AdTruth's technology uses non-UDID information to identify a wide range of devices for cookieless ad targeting. Its technology currently has about a 90 percent accuracy rate on iOS, higher on Android and desktop. AdTruth also has mobile web to app bridging capabilities as well as DeviceInsight technology, enabling marketers to identify users across mobile web and app content.

41st Parameter's patented AdTruth technology is being used by MdotM, in response to the deprecation of the UDID that included tracking and targeting capabilities.

== Competitors ==
AdTruth's main competitor is BlueCava, which deploys a similar device-fingerprinting technology.
