= National Hunter =

British credit fraud checking agency

National Hunter is a British credit fraud checking agency that operates an "anti-fraud data sharing system", operated by Experian Decision Analytics, on behalf of its members, around 90 British financial institutions, including banks, building societies, mortgage lenders and finance companies. Information entered by applicants for credit within one of the member organisations is recorded in the system, and can be cross-checked against other applications.

== Process ==
For instance, a person applying for a loan with one company and stating their salary as £10,000 could have their application rejected if in a subsequent application for a different product from a different company they stated their salary as £100,000. The process is not fully automated in the way most credit scoring is – suspicious applications are flagged by National Hunter and then checked before an institution makes the decision to decline an application. According to Barclaycard, "Every night, we send it almost all our card applications. Next morning, its computers send them back, either with OK or showing a potential fraud, If it's the latter, then we might decide to contact the applicant, although that may depend on other factors."

== Information security ==
Individuals have a statutory right to obtain a copy of the information held by the company about them, in accordance with the Data Protection Act. National Hunter recommends applicants request their credit report as a first step in finding out why they have been rejected for credit but the credit report will not show the data that is on National Hunter, indicating why a lender thinks a customer's application is fraudulent.

== History ==
The system was set up in 1993, by MCL Software of Southport, Merseyside, now an Experian subsidiary. The Guardian newspaper has described National Hunter as the UK's "secret credit reference agency".
