= Credit circle =

Firms sharing intel on customers payment habits

A credit circle is created when members of a common group, typically a trade association or federation, come together to share information on credit related matters of their customers, such as late payers or bad debtors. Credit circles traditionally would meet together on a fairly regular basis, although some now share information online to allow each member to carry out a real time credit check on any new customers.

== Function and distinction from credit bureaus ==
Credit circles are informal or semi-formal arrangements in which members of a trade association or industry group share information about customers’ payment histories, credit performance, and repayment behaviour. These exchanges are typically limited to group members and are intended to help participants evaluate trade credit risk among familiar clients.

By contrast, a credit bureau is a formal credit reporting organisation that collects and compiles credit histories or payment performance information from a wide range of sources and provides comprehensive credit reports to users such as lenders and other authorised parties. Credit bureaus gather data that may include payment histories, account statuses, public records, and credit relationships, and produce credit reports used to assess creditworthiness in lending decisions. Unlike informal credit circles, credit bureaus operate on a broader scale and serve many users beyond a single trade group.

== See also ==
- Credit bureau
- Credit risk
