= Technopark Stellenbosch =

Coordinates: 33.964918°S 18.836815°E

Techno Park Stellenbosch is a technology focused science park situated on land previously owned by Stellenbosch Municipality, adjoining the farm Kleine Zalze which is located to the south of the town Stellenbosch and adjacent to the Stellenbosch Golf Club.

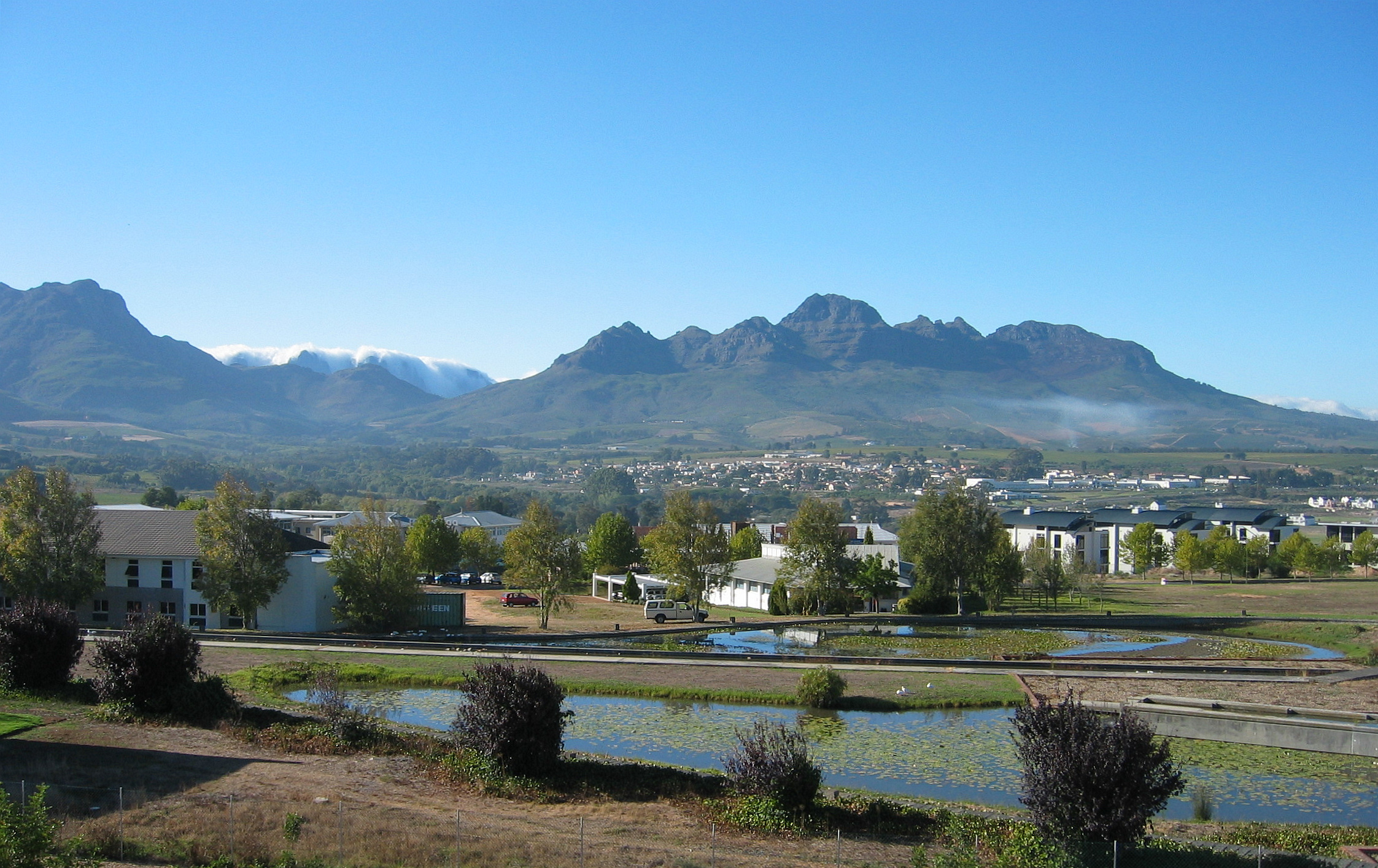
The view from the highest point in Techno Park, looking towards the east

== History ==
The Idea to establish a science park was originally conceived by Christo Viljoen, then Dean of the Faculty of Engineering of Stellenbosch University, after a visit to the Hsinchu Science and Industrial Park in Taiwan. The proposals that he made in this regard were put forward to the Town Council during 1981 and was subsequently taken up by the council as a priority project.

An application for the establishment of a science park (Techno Park) was submitted during April 1986 to the then Administrator of the Cape of Good Hope after a R10 million government loan was secured by the Municipality of Stellenbosch for the development of a first phase of such a park.

The application to the Administrator was followed by a thorough impact study and investigation with regard to appropriate development parameters.

The zoning of the land was approved during June 1987 and a development plan was completed thereafter. Construction commenced during early 1987 and was completed during the same year. A number of high-tech companies in Techno Park are spin-offs from research and development undertaken by Stellenbosch University, but Techno Park has developed over the past few years and now features many offices and businesses alike.

== Major companies located in the park ==
- Adept Internet
- Campbell Scientific Africa
- Capitec Bank
- Compuscan
- Garmin
- Protea Hotel
- Reutech Radar Systems
- Workshack
- Moonstone Business School of Excellence
