= Reynir Grétarsson =

Icelandic businessman

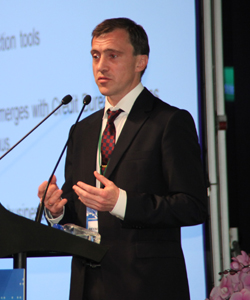
- Born: Reynir Finndal Grétarsson; 29 December 1972 (age 53); Blönduós
- Education: University of Iceland
- Occupations: Businessman, currently Chairman of Creditinfo Group
- Years active: 1997–present
- Children: Grétar, Salma Björk and Hildur Ösp
- Website: chronicle.creditinfo.com/reynir/

Reynir F. Grétarsson (born 29 December 1972) is an Icelandic entrepreneur, philanthropist, Icelandic map collector and author of "About Mapping Iceland" Founder and former CEO of Creditinfo Group, a multinational credit bureau and risk management company. Reynir was selected entrepreneur of the year in Iceland in 2008.^{[14]}

== Early life ==
Reynir was born in Blönduós in 1972 to father Grétar Guðmundsson and mother Ingunn Gísladóttir. After graduating from Menntaskólinn á Akureyri in 1992 he was admitted to the University of Iceland and became a law graduate in 1997, after which graduating with a master's degree in law.

== Career ==
Reynir is a co-founder of Lánstraust hf., the predecessor of Creditinfo Group, in 1997. He co-founded a few other companies, with operations in IT and in real estate. He served as a board member for several companies. Reynir has participated in establishing and/or building up Credit Bureaus in approximately 30 countries. He was selected entrepreneur of the year in Iceland in 2008.

In 2017 he stepped down as CEO of CreditInfo Group after 20 years of leading and expanding the company he co-founded and became a part-time working Chairman instead. Reflecting on his decision to step down as CEO, Reynir mentioned in recent interviews that he decided to finally hire a better person for the job, hinting at feelings of burnout as well. During the same year he sold a small part of his share in CreditInfo Group (having acquired 93% of the company by 2013).

In 2018, Reynir co-funded two new companies, Two Birds (fintech) and Svartigaldur (online marketing).

In 2021, Reynir sold a considerable portion of his shares in CreditInfo Group to Levine Leichtman Capital Partners, retaining 35% of his shares. At the time of the purchase, CreditInfo Group was valued at around 30 billion ISK (approximately $210 million), with the final valuation contingent upon the company achieving certain financial milestones.

To reinvest his capital, Reynir established InfoCapital, an investment fund primarily focused on fintech startups led by his childhood friend Hákon Stefánsson, while serving as a non-executive chairman of the board himself. InfoCapital extends beyond the startup sphere, holding the largest share in Sýn (the largest media company in Iceland) and investing in Reynir's hometown of Blönduós. In August 2021 Reynir was appointed CEO of SaltPay (now Teya). He resigned after 8 months, stating that his objectives as CEO had been accomplished. After his time at SaltPay, Reynir redirected his focus and made substantial investment in renovating his hometown of Blönduós. The renovation project included the acquisition of a hotel, a bakery, and a church, among other historic buildings dating back to 1900, with the aim of preserving their rich heritage and attracting more tourists to North-West Iceland. Reynir not only provided financial support but also contributed hands-on work, alongside his father, who is a skilled carpenter.

== Personal life ==
Reynir has one son, Grétar, and two daughters, Salma Björk and Hildur Ösp. He lives in Reykjavik. Reynir graduated from the University of Iceland in 2014 with a BA degree in Anthropology. In 2013, he earned a diploma in International Development. Additionally, Reynir is a qualified lawyer with a Master of Laws(LL.M.) degree issued by the University of Iceland in 1997.
