= ClearSale =

Fraud management company

ClearSale LLC
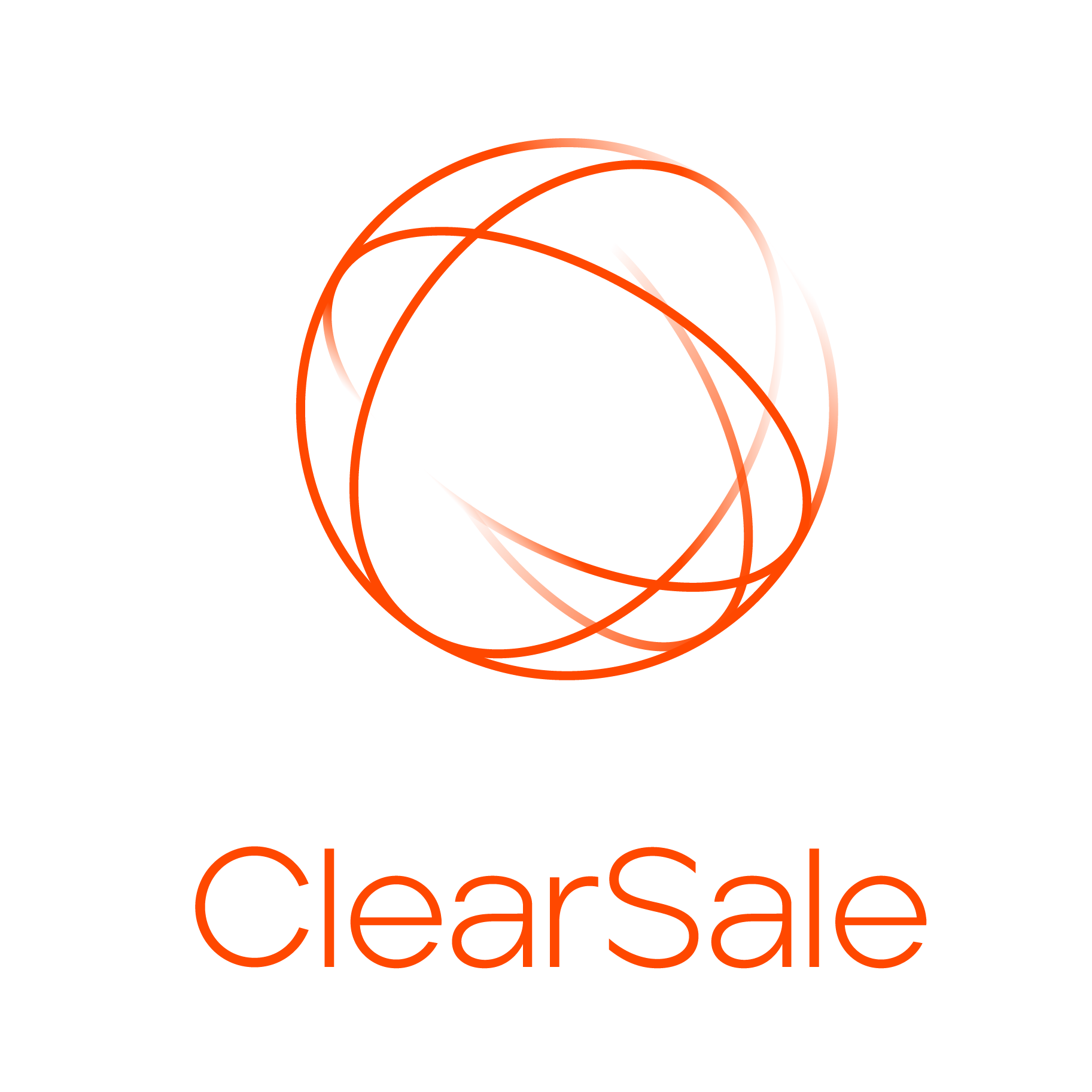
- Type: Private
- Industry: Fraud management technology
- Founded: 2001; 25 years ago
- Founder: Pedro Chiamulera
- Headquarters: Brazil
- Owner: Experian
- Number of employees: + 2500
- Website: clear.sale

ClearSale LLC is a fraud management and chargeback protection services company that was founded in Brazil in 2001. It has offices in Miami and São Paulo and has over 1,000 employees.

Working with e-commerce firms to identify fraudulent transactions, its fraud detection software combines machine learning with human interaction. The ClearSale platform tracks orders submitted to its clients' websites and sorts orders based on its determined fraud risk; a manual review process is required for denied transactions to reduce false positives.

It focuses on indicators of CNP fraud management such as chargeback losses, rejected orders, fraud, and response time. ClearSale's platform includes end-to-end fraud management and prevention.

== History ==
ClearSale was founded in 2001 by former Olympic athlete Pedro Chiamulera. In 2008, it partnered with Quova to use Quova's internet geolocation data for ClearSale's fraud detection platform.

In 2016, 3.05% of the transactions analyzed were tried for fraud. In April, Rand Internet Marketing partnered with Clearsale to make ClearSale's fraud prevention accessible to Rand's clients. That same month, ClearSale expanded with the release of its software for U.S.-based e-commerce merchants.

The company launched an integrated behavioral biometric function for its fraud-protection software in August. It analyzes customer behavior to historical user behavior to determine the legitimacy of an order.

Also in 2016, ClearSale released a map of fraud to identify trends in fraud attempts in Brazilian e-commerce. The behavior analyses includes the time a customer spends on the website before purchasing, as short times on the website are a potential fraud indicator, along with other variables. The software processes approved orders within seconds and orders flagged for manual review can take 24 to 48 hours.

It has released integration modules for Stripe, Zoey, OpenCart, Volusion, Magento, BigCommerce, Shopify, PrestaShop, and WooCommerce. In October 2017, ClearSale announced the addition of fraud detection for real-time applications such as games and distance learning courses. ClearSale launched its Active Market Radar and Behavior Analytics in December 2017, which includes a fraud radar score calculation for clients.

In October 2024, Experian agreed to acquire ClearSale for $350 million, pending regulatory approval in Brazil and hoping to complete the deal by the middle of the following year. On April 2, 2025, Experian announced that it had completed the purchase of the Brazilian firm.
