= IdentityForce =

American identity theft software provider

- Company type: Subsidiary
- Industry: Software
- Founded: 2005 in Massachusetts
- Founder: Steven Bearak and Judy Leary
- Defunct: 2018
- Fate: Acquired
- Successor: Sontiq which was acquired by TransUnion
- Headquarters: Framingham, Massachusetts, United States
- Area served: United States
- Products: Identity theft protection
- Owner: TransUnion
- Website: www.identityforce.com

IdentityForce is an American identity theft protection software service provider for consumers, businesses, organizations, and U.S. government agencies.

Headquartered in Framingham, Massachusetts, IdentityForce was founded by siblings Steven Bearak and Judy Leary in 2005.

IdentityForce was originally incorporated in Massachusetts, on October 30, 1978, as Stop-Loss Associates, Inc., a sub chapter S corporation. On August 15, 2018, IdentityForce announced it was acquired as a subsidiary of EZShield. In June 2019, EZShield and IdentityForce re-branded under the parent company, Sontiq Inc. Sontiq was acquired by TransUnion with the IdentityForce service being incorporated into the TransUnion brand.

== History ==
=== Early years (1978–1996) ===
In 1978, Herbert P. Bearak founded and incorporated Stop-Loss Associates, Inc., a loss prevention analysis company, which included the development, implementation, and testing of security policy and procedure best practices as well as security equipment and systems.

In 1992, Bearak Reports was established as a service division of Stop-Loss Associates, Inc. Using credit and widely available non-credit information, the company sold a broad range of asset search, background screening, business intelligence and public record information services to law firms, financial services companies, government agencies, and general corporate and private users.

In 1996, Stop-Loss Associates was acquired in an asset sale by the Marcom Group, with Herbert Bearak and other family members retaining 100% of the company’s stock. Following the sale the company officially changed its name to Bearak Reports, Inc.

In late 1996, The Privacy Group was launched as a service division of Bearak Reports, Inc. The Privacy Group created a toolkit to help consumers protect their personal privacy during the early years of the digital internet revolution.

=== Establishment of IdentityForce ===
In 2006, Bearak Reports, Inc. launched IdentityForce, to serve companies and government agencies that experience a data breach. Shortly thereafter, public concern over the security of personal information stored by the federal government was raised when the U. S. Department of Veterans Affairs revealed that it had suffered a data breach that compromised the personal information of more than 28,650,000 active duty personnel and veterans. Subsequently, the U.S. General Services Administration (GSA) awarded Bearak Reports, Inc., d/b/a IdentityForce a government-wide Federal Supply Schedule Blanket Purchase Agreement (BPA) for identity monitoring, and data breach response and protection services.

In 2011 and 2013, the company was awarded other blanket purchase agreements for similar products. In 2015, IdentityForce was awarded Tier One status as an approved provider of identity protection services for data breaches affecting over 21.5 million people.

In 2016, Bearak Reports, Inc. officially changed its name to IdentityForce, Inc.

=== Acquisition and rebranding (2018-2021) ===
On August 15, 2018, IdentityForce was acquired by EZShield, a portfolio company of the Wicks group, for an undisclosed amount. EZShield said the acquisition would expand its capabilities to offer digital security measures as cybercrime increases.

On June 26, 2019, IdentityForce merged with EZShield under a new name, Sontiq. The new combined company was headquartered in Framingham, Massachusetts. Brian J. Longe joined Sontiq in March 2020 as the company's President and CEO.

In 2021 TransUnion completed the acquisition of Sontiq bringing IdentityForce into its product set.
