= Innovis =

American consumer credit reporting agency

- Traded as: Private
- Industry: Credit bureau
- Founded: 1970; 56 years ago
- Headquarters: Columbus, Ohio, United States
- Area served: United States
- Parent: CBC Companies
- Website: Official website

Innovis is the credit reporting division of CBC Companies and is considered the fourth largest consumer credit reporting agency in the United States, behind the "big three" Experian, TransUnion, and Equifax. Based in Columbus, Ohio, the company offers services such as fraud protection, credit information, identity verification, and receivables management.

Innovis is a subsidiary of CBC Companies, but companies that report debt activity, such as Verizon, refer to the company by the name "Innovis", or simply state that they report to "all four credit agencies".

== Company history ==
Innovis began as ACB Services, founded by Associated Credit Bureaus (ACB) in 1970.

In 1989, ACB Services was purchased and renamed Consumers Credit Associates (CCA). First Data Corporation purchased CCA and renamed it Innovis, Inc. in 1997. Most recently, CBC Companies purchased Innovis, Inc. in 1999.

Although they have the same parent company, Innovis is different than CBCInnovis, which merged with mortgage credit-reporting agency, Factual Data, in 2019.

== Products ==
- Identity verification
- Receivables management
- Fraud and identity theft prevention
- Consumer Reports

=== Credit reports ===
The company's credit reports contain personal information and credit history. It does not include credit scores. Their reports are most often used for pre-screened marketing offers. Their services are also used by cell phone service providers.

Innovis also collects non-traditional credit information like rent payments, magazine subscriptions and utility bills.

=== FailSafe Fraud Suite ===
Under the direction of Bruce Nixon, president of Innovis, the company launched the FailSafe Fraud Suite, which provides multi-layer authentication that works to identify abnormal patterns of behavior in an effort to fight fraud.
