= Equifax Canada =

Canadian credit bureau

Equifax Canada, Inc.
- Trade name: Equifax Canada
- Type: Canadian division
- Industry: Credit risk assessment
- Headquarters: Toronto, Ontario, Canada
- Parent: Equifax USA
- Website: equifax.ca

Equifax Canada Inc is one of two credit bureaus which are private companies in Canada, that (the other being TransUnion Canada) collect, store, and share information about how Canadians use credit. Reports are provided for both individual and commercial entities. Owned by Equifax of Atlanta, Georgia, Equifax Canada is based in Toronto, Ontario.

All credit reporting companies are required by Quebec provincial law to allow Quebec citizens to verify their credit reports and scores online at no cost. Equifax Canada took additional steps in 2021 to expand this access to all Canadians.

== See also ==
- Identity theft
