= Medical Information Technology =

Medical Information Technology can refer to

- Health technology
- Health information technology
- Meditech, Medical Information Technology, Inc.

== See also ==
- Health informatics
