= Fair Credit Reporting Act =

U.S. federal legislation

- Other short titles: Consumer Credit Protection Act Amendment; Consumer Credit Reporting; Credit Reporting Agencies
- Long title: An Act to amend the Federal Deposit Insurance Act to require insured banks to maintain certain records, to require that certain transactions in U.S. currency be reported to the Department of the Treasury, and for other purposes.
- Nicknames: Federal Deposit Insurance Act Amendments
- Enacted by: the 91st United States Congress
- Effective: October 26, 1970

Citations
- Public law: 91-508
- Statutes at Large: 84 Stat. 1114-2 aka 84 Stat. 1127

Codification
- Titles amended: 12 U.S.C.: Banks and Banking; 15 U.S.C.: Commerce and Trade
- U.S.C. sections amended: 12 U.S.C. ch. 16 §§ 1830-1831; 15 U.S.C. ch. 41 § 1681 et seq.

Legislative history
- Introduced in the House as H.R. 15073 on December 3, 1969; Passed the House on May 25, 1970 (302–0); Signed into law by President Richard Nixon on October 26, 1970

Major amendments
- Fair and Accurate Credit Transactions Act; Credit CARD Act of 2009; USA Freedom Act

United States Supreme Court cases
- TRW Inc. v. Andrews, 534 U.S. 19 (2001); Safeco Insurance Co. v. Burr, 551 U.S. 47 (2007); Spokeo, Inc. v. Robins, No. 13-1339, 578 U.S. ___ (2016); TransUnion LLC v. Ramirez, No. 20-297, 594 U.S. ___ (2021); Department of Agriculture Rural Development Rural Housing Service v. Kirtz, No. 22-846, 601 U.S. ___ (2024)

The Fair Credit Reporting Act (FCRA), 15 U.S.C. § 1681 et seq., is federal legislation enacted to promote the accuracy, fairness, and privacy of consumer information contained in the files of consumer reporting agencies. It was intended to shield consumers from the willful or negligent inclusion of erroneous data in their credit reports. To that end, the FCRA regulates the collection, dissemination, and use of consumer information, including consumer credit information. It was originally passed in 1970, and is enforced by the U.S. Federal Trade Commission, the Consumer Financial Protection Bureau, and private litigants.

== History ==
Before standardization of credit scoring, statements of character were integral to credit reports well into the 1960s. With credit reports containing probing details about personality, habits, and health, in the hearings on the Fair Credit Reporting Act lawmakers were troubled that individuals were helpless to clear up errors.

The Fair Credit Reporting Act, as originally enacted, was title VI of Pub. L. 91–508, 84 Stat. 1114, enacted October 26, 1970, entitled An Act to amend the Federal Deposit Insurance Act to require insured banks to maintain certain records, to require that certain transactions in United States currency be reported to the Department of the Treasury, and for other purposes. It was written as an amendment to add a title VI to the Consumer Credit Protection Act, Pub. L. 90–321, 82 Stat. 146, enacted June 29, 1968.

The Fair Credit Reporting Act was one of the first data privacy laws passed in the Information Age. The findings of the U.S. Congress that led to the Act and the Act's regulatory goals set the direction of information privacy in the U.S. and the world for the next sixty years. Among these innovations were the determination that there should be no secret databases to make decisions about a person's life, individuals should have a right to see and challenge the information held in such databases, and that information in such a database should expire after a reasonable amount of time.

== Consumer reports ==
Commonly referred to as credit reports, a consumer report "contains information about your credit—and some bill repayment history—and the status of your credit accounts. This information includes how often you make your payments on time, how much credit you have, how much credit you have available, how much credit you are using, and whether a debt or bill collector is collecting on money you owe. Credit reports also can contain rental repayment information if you are a property renter. It also can contain public records such as liens, judgments, and bankruptcies that provide insight into your financial status and obligations."

== Inaccuracies in consumer reports ==
A 2015 study released by the Federal Trade Commission found that 23% of consumers identified inaccurate information in their credit reports. Under the Fair and Accurate Credit Transactions Act (FACTA), an amendment to the FCRA passed in 2003, consumers are able to receive a free copy of their consumer report from each credit reporting agency once a year. The free report can be requested by telephone, mail, or through the government-authorized website: AnnualCreditReport.com.

== Civil liability ==
The FCRA regulates:

1. Consumer reporting agencies;
2. Users of consumer reports; and,
3. Furnishers of consumer information.

If a consumer's rights under the FCRA are violated, then they can recover:

1. Actual or statutory damages;
2. Attorney's fees;
3. Court costs; and,
4. Punitive damages if the violation was willful. "The threat of punitive damages under 1681n of the FCRA is the primary factor deterring erroneous reporting by the reporting industry."

The statute of limitations requires consumers to file suit prior to the earlier of: two years after the violation is discovered; or five years after the violation occurred.

Consumer attorneys often take these cases on a contingency fee basis because the statute allows a consumer to recover attorney's fees from the offending party.

== Users of consumer reports ==
Users of the information for credit, insurance, or employment purposes (including background checks) have the following responsibilities under the FCRA:

1. Users can only obtain consumer reports for permissible purposes under the FCRA;
2. Users must notify the consumer when an adverse action is taken on the basis of such reports; and,
3. Users must identify the company that provided the report, so that the accuracy and completeness of the report may be verified or contested by the consumer.

== Employment background checks ==
Employers using consumer reports to screen job applicants or employees must follow specific procedures:

1. Get your written permission;
2. Tell you how they want to use your credit report;
3. Not misuse your information;
4. Give you a copy of your credit report if the employer decides not to hire or fires you; and,
5. Give you an opportunity to dispute the information contained within your credit report before making a final adverse decision.

== Furnishers of information ==
A furnisher, as defined by the FCRA, is a company that furnishes information to consumer reporting agencies. Typically, these are creditors, with which a consumer has some sort of credit agreement (such as credit card companies, auto finance companies and mortgage banking institutions).

Other examples of information furnishers are collection agencies (third-party collectors), state or municipal courts reporting a judgment of some kind, past and present employers and bonders. Lenders have an important role to play in ensuring credit reports are accurate. Under the FCRA, creditors who furnish information about consumers to consumer reporting agencies must:

1. Provide complete and accurate information to the credit reporting agencies;
2. Investigate consumer disputes received from credit reporting agencies;
3. Correct, delete, or verify information within 30 days of receipt of a dispute; and,
4. Inform consumers about negative information which is in the process of or has already been placed on a consumer's credit report within one month.

(This notice doesn't have to be sent as a separate notice, but may be placed on a consumer's monthly statement. If sent as part as the monthly statement, it needs to be conspicuous, but need not be in bold type. Required wording developed by the US Federal Treasury Department):

Notice before negative information is reported: We may report information about your account to credit bureaus. Late payments, missed payments, or other defaults on your account may be reflected in your credit report.

Notice after negative information is reported: We have told a credit bureau about a late payment, missed payment or other default on your account. This information may be reflected in your credit report.

== Consumer reporting agencies (CRAs) ==
Credit reporting agencies (CRAs) are entities that collect and disseminate information about consumers to be used for credit evaluation and certain other purposes, including employment. Credit bureaus, a type of consumer reporting agency, hold a consumer's credit report in their databases. CRAs have a number of responsibilities under FCRA, including the following:

1. CRAs must maintain reasonable procedures to ensure the maximum possible accuracy of the information contained within a consumer's report;
2. Provide a consumer with information about him or her in the agency's files and take steps to verify the accuracy of information disputed by a consumer;
3. If negative information is removed as a result of a consumer's dispute, it may not be reinserted without notifying the consumer in writing within five days; and,
4. Remove negative information seven years after the date of first delinquency (except for bankruptcies (10 years) and tax liens (seven years from the time they are paid).

The three big CRAs—Experian, TransUnion, and Equifax—do not interact with information furnishers directly as a result of consumer disputes. They use a system called E-Oscar. In some areas of the country, however, there are other credit bureaus.

=== Nationwide specialty consumer reporting agencies ===
In addition to the three big CRAs, the FCRA also classifies dozens of other information technology companies as "nationwide specialty consumer reporting agencies" that produce individual consumer reports used to make credit determinations. Under Section 603 of the Fair Credit Reporting Act, the term "nationwide specialty consumer reporting agency" means a consumer reporting agency that compiles and maintains files on consumers on a nationwide basis relating to:

1. Medical records or payments;
2. Residential or tenant history;
3. Check writing history;
4. Employment history; or,
5. Insurance claims.

Because these nationwide specialty consumer reporting agencies sell consumer credit report files, they are required to provide annual disclosures of their report files to any consumer who requests disclosure. A partial list of companies classified as nationwide specialty consumer reporting agencies under FCRA includes: Telecheck, ChoicePoint, Acxiom, Integrated Screening Partners, Innovis, the Insurance Services Office, Tenant Data Services, LexisNexis, Retail Equation, Central Credit, Teletrack, the MIB Group, United Health Group (Ingenix Division), and Milliman.

Although the major CRAs Experian, Equifax, and TransUnion are required by law to provide a central source website for consumers to request their reports, the nationwide specialty consumer reporting agencies are not required to provide a centralized online source for disclosure. The FCRA Section 612 merely requires nationwide specialty consumer reporting agencies to establish a streamlined process for consumers to request consumer reports, which shall include, at a minimum, the establishment by each such agency of a toll-free telephone number for such consumer disclosure requests.

== See also ==
- Annualcreditreport.com
- Adverse Credit History
- Background check
- Credit card
- Credit history
- Credit rating agency
- Credit score
- Fair and Accurate Credit Transactions Act
- Fair Credit Billing Act
- Identity theft
- Identity Theft Resource Center
- Tenant Screening
- Financial privacy laws in the United States
