= Credit score =

Numerical expression representing a person's creditworthiness

A credit score is a numerical expression based on a level analysis of a person's credit files, to represent the creditworthiness of an individual. A credit score is primarily based on a credit report, information typically sourced from credit bureaus.

Lenders, such as banks and credit card companies, use credit scores to evaluate the potential risk posed by lending money to consumers and to mitigate losses due to bad debt. Lenders use credit scores to determine who qualifies for a loan, at what interest rate, and what credit limits. Lenders also use credit scores to determine which customers are likely to bring in the most revenue.

Credit scoring is not limited to banks. Other organizations, such as mobile phone companies, insurance companies, landlords, and government departments employ the same techniques. Digital finance companies such as online lenders also use alternative data sources to calculate the creditworthiness of borrowers.

== By country ==
=== Australia ===
In Australia, credit scoring is widely accepted as the primary method of assessing creditworthiness. Credit scoring is used not only to determine whether credit should be approved to an applicant, but for credit scoring in the setting of credit limits on credit or store cards, in behavioral modelling such as collections scoring, and also in the pre-approval of additional credit to a company's existing client base.

Although logistic (or non-linear) probability modelling is still the most popular means by which to develop scorecards, various other methods offer powerful alternatives, including MARS, CART, CHAID, and random forests.

Prior to 12 March 2014 Veda Advantage, the main provider of credit file data, provided only a negative credit reporting system containing information on applications for credit and adverse listings indicating a default under a credit contract. Veda was acquired by Equifax in Feb 2016, making Equifax the largest credit agency in Australia.

=== Austria ===
In Austria, credit scoring is done as a blacklist. Consumers who did not pay bills end up on the blacklists that are held by different credit bureaus. Having an entry on the black list may result in the denial of contracts. Certain enterprises including telecom carriers use the list on a regular basis. Banks also use these lists, but rather inquire about security and income when considering loans. Beside these lists several agencies and credit bureaus provide credit scoring of consumers.

According to the Austrian Data Protection Act, consumers must opt-in for the use of their private data for any purpose. Consumers can also withhold permission to use the data later, making illegal any further distribution or use of the collected data. Consumers also have the right to receive a free copy of all data held by credit bureaus once a year. Wrong or unlawfully collected data must be deleted or corrected.

=== Brazil ===
Credit scoring is relatively new in Brazil. Previously, credit reporting was done as a blacklist and each lender used to assess potential borrowers on their own criteria. Nowadays, the system of credit reports and scores in Brazil is very similar to that in the United States.

A credit score is a number based on a statistical analysis of a person's credit information, which represents the creditworthiness of that person. It is the most important tool used by financial institutions during a credit analysis that aims to assist the decision-making process of granting credit and conducting business, in order to verify the likelihood that people will pay their bills. A credit score is primarily based on credit report information, typically from one of the three major credit bureaus: Serasa Experian, Boa Vista (previously Equifax do Brasil) and SPC Brasil.

There are different methods of calculating credit scores in Brazil. In general, scores range from 0 to 1000 indicating what is the chance of a certain profile of consumers paying their bills on time in the next 12 months. The score is calculated from several factors, but practically it analyzes a person's trajectory as a consumer, what includes up to date payments of bills, history of negative debts, financial relationships with companies and updated personal data on credit protection agencies, such as Serasa Experian, Boa Vista, SPC, Quod and Foregon.

=== Canada ===
The system of credit reports and scores in Canada is very similar to that in the United States and India, with two of the same reporting agencies active in the country: Equifax and TransUnion. Experian, which entered the Canadian market with the purchase of Northern Credit Bureaus in 2008, announced the closing of its Canadian operations as of 18 April 2009.

There are, however, some key differences. One is that, unlike in the United States, where a consumer is allowed only one free copy of their credit report a year, in Canada, the consumer may order a free copy of their credit report any number of times in a year, as long as the request is made in writing, and as long as the consumer asks for a printed copy to be delivered by mail. Borrowell and CreditKarma offers free credit report and credit check and this request by the consumer is noted in the credit report as a 'soft inquiry', so it has no effect on their credit score. According to Equifax's ScorePower Report, Equifax Beacon scores range from 300 to 900. Trans Union Emperica scores also range from 300 to 900.

The Government of Canada offers a free publication called Understanding Your Credit Report. This publication provides sample credit report and credit score documents, with explanations of the notations and codes that are used. It also contains general information on how to build or improve credit history, and how to check for signs that identity theft has occurred. The publication is available online at the Financial Consumer Agency of Canada. Paper copies can also be ordered at no charge for residents of Canada.

=== China ===
Private companies have developed credit score systems such as Sesame Credit (which is provided by Alibaba affiliate Ant Financial) and Tencent Credit.

=== Denmark ===
The credit scoring is widely used in Denmark by the banks and a number of private companies within telco and others. The credit scoring is split in two:

- Private: The probability of defaulting
- Businesses: The probability of bankruptcy

For privates, the credit scoring is always made by the creditor. For businesses it is either made by the creditor or by a third party. A business credit score is a direct representation of a company's creditworthiness.

There are a few companies who have specialized in developing credit scorecards in Denmark:

- Experian (generic rating for business)
- Bisnode (generic rating for business)

The credit scorecards in Denmark are mainly based on information provided by the applicant and publicly available data. It is very restricted by legislation compared to its neighbouring countries.

=== Germany ===
In Germany, credit scoring is widely accepted as the primary method of assessing creditworthiness. Credit scoring is used not only to determine whether credit should be approved to an applicant, but for credit scoring in the setting of credit limits on credit or store cards, in behavioral modelling such as collections scoring, and also in the pre-approval of additional credit to a company's existing client base.

Consumers have the right to receive a free copy of all data held by credit bureaus once a year. At present Schufa, the main provider of credit file data, provides scores for about three-quarters of the German population.

=== India ===
In India, there are four credit information companies licensed by Reserve Bank of India. The Credit Information Bureau (India) Limited (CIBIL) has functioned as a Credit Information Company from January 2001. Subsequently, in 2010, Experian, Equifax and CRIF High Mark were given licenses by Reserve Bank of India to operate as Credit Information Companies in India. Transunion bought CIBIL.

Although all the four credit information companies have developed their individual credit scores, the most popular is CIBIL credit score. The CIBIL credit score is a three digit number that represents a summary of individuals' credit history and credit rating. This score ranges from 300 to 900, with 900 being the best score. Individuals with no credit history will have a score of −1. If the credit history is less than six months, the score will be 0. CIBIL credit score takes time to build up and usually it takes between 18 and 36 months or more of credit usage to obtain a satisfactory credit score.

=== Ireland ===
In Ireland, a person's credit score is calculated by the Irish Credit Bureau (ICB), a private organisation, financed by its members (financial institutions and local authorities). A person taking out a loan must consent to their data being given to the ICB. A person may receive their own credit report on paying a €6 fee to the ICB. Credit scores run from 224 (the worst value) to 581 (the best value).

There is also a separate Central Credit Register (CCR) maintained by the Central Bank of Ireland, founded in 2017 under the terms of the Credit Reporting Act 2013. The lender must check the CCR if a person is borrowing more than €2,000, and can also check it if the loan is lower; consent from the borrower is not required.

Information is removed from both registers (ICB and CCR) five years after the loan is repaid.

=== Norway ===
In Norway, credit scoring services are provided by three credit scoring agencies: Dun & Bradstreet, Experian and Lindorff Decision. Credit scoring is based on publicly available information such as demographic data, tax returns, taxable income and any Betalingsanmerkning (non-payment records) that might be registered on the credit-scored individual. Upon being scored, an individual will receive a notice (written or by e-mail) from the scoring agency stating who performed the credit score as well as any information provided in the score. In addition, many credit institutions use custom scorecards based on any number of parameters. Credit scores range between 300 and 999.

=== South Africa ===
Credit scoring is used throughout the credit industry in South Africa, with the likes of banks, micro-lenders, clothing retailers, furniture retailers, specialized lenders and insurers all using credit scores. Currently all four retail credit bureau offer credit bureau scores. The data stored by the credit bureaus include both positive and negative data, increasing the predictive power of the individual scores. TransUnion (formerly ITC) offer the Empirica Score which is, as of mid-2010, in its 4th generation. The Empirica score is segmented into two suites: the account origination (AO) and account management (AM). Experian South Africa likewise has a Delphi credit score with their fourth generation about to be released (late 2010). In 2011, Compuscan released Compuscore ABC, a scoring suite which predicts the probability of customer default throughout the credit life cycle. Six years later, Compuscan introduced Compuscore PSY, a 3-digit psychometric-based credit bureau score used by lenders to make informed lending decisions on thin files or marginal declines.

=== Sri Lanka ===
According to the provisions of Credit Information Bureau Act No 18 of 1990 (as amended by Act No 42 of 2008), CRIB has been delegated with power to issue credit reports to any subject to whom that information is related to. The Bureau commenced to issue Self Inquiry Credit Reports in December 2009.

=== Sweden ===
Sweden has a system for credit scoring that aims to find people with a history of neglect to pay bills or, most commonly, taxes. Anyone who does not pay their debts on time, and fails to make payments after a reminder, will have their case forwarded to the Swedish Enforcement Authority which is a national authority for collecting debts. The mere appearance of a company, or government office, as a debtor to this authority will result in a record among private credit bureaus; however, this does not apply to individuals as debtors. This record is called a Betalningsanmärkning (non-payment record) and by law can be stored for three years for an individual and five years for a company. This kind of nonpayment record will make it very difficult to get a loan, rent an apartment, get telephone subscriptions, rent a car or get a job that involves handling cash. The banks also use income and asset figures in connection with loan assessments.

If a person gets an injunction to pay issued by the Enforcement Authority, it is possible to dispute it. Then the party requesting the payment must show its correctness in district court. Failure to dispute is seen as admitting the debt. If the debtor loses the court trial, costs for the trial are added to the debt. Taxes and authority fees must always be paid on demand unless payment has already been made.

Every person with a Swedish national identification number must register a valid address, even if living abroad, since sent letters are considered to have been delivered to that person once they reach the registered address. As an example, Swedish astronaut Christer Fuglesang got a Betalningsanmärkning since a car he had ordered, and therefore owned, passed a toll station for the Stockholm congestion tax. At the time, he was living in the USA training for his first Space Shuttle mission and had an old invalid address registered for the car. Letters with payment requests did not reach him on time. The case was appealed and retracted, but the non-payment record remained for three years since it could not be retracted according to the law.

=== United Kingdom ===
Credit scoring in the United Kingdom is very different to that of the United States and other nations. There is no such thing as a universal credit score or credit rating in the UK. Each lender will assess potential borrowers on their own criteria, and these algorithms are effectively trade secrets.

"Credit scores" which are available for individuals to see and provided from Credit Reference Agencies such as Call Credit, Equifax, Experian and TransUnion are marketed to consumers and are not usually used by lenders. Most lenders instead use their own internal scoring mechanism.

The most popular statistical technique used is logistic regression to predict a binary outcome: bad debt (meaning the borrower has defaulted on the loan) or not. Some banks also build regression models that predict the amount of bad debt a customer may incur. Typically this is much harder to predict, and most banks focus only on the binary outcome.

Credit scoring is closely regulated only by the Financial Conduct Authority when used for the purposes of the Advanced approach to Capital Adequacy under Basel II regulations.

Credit scoring is closely regulated in the UK, with the industry regulator being the Information Commissioner's Office (ICO). Consumers can also send complaints to the Financial Ombudsman Service if they experience problems with any Credit Reference Agency.

It is very difficult for a consumer to know in advance whether they have a high enough credit score to be accepted for credit with a given lender. This situation is due to the complexity and structure of credit scoring, which differs from one lender to another.

Lenders need not reveal their credit score head, nor need they reveal the minimum credit score required for the applicant to be accepted, because there may not be such a minimum score.

If the applicant is declined for credit, the lender is not obliged to reveal the exact reason why. However, industry associations including the Finance and Leasing Association oblige their members to provide a satisfactory reason. Credit bureau data sharing agreements also require that an applicant declined based on credit bureau data be told that this is the reason and the address of the credit bureau must be provided.

=== United States ===
In the United States, a credit score is a number based on a statistical analysis of a person's credit files, that in theory represents the creditworthiness of that person, which is the likelihood that people will pay their bills. A credit score is primarily based on credit report information, typically from one of the three major credit bureaus: Experian, TransUnion, and Equifax. Income and employment history (or lack thereof) are not considered by the major credit bureaus when calculating credit scores.

There are different methods of calculating credit scores. FICO scores, the most widely used type of credit score, is a credit score developed by FICO, previously known as Fair Isaac Corporation. As of 2018, there were 29 different versions of FICO scores in use in the United States. Some of these versions are "industry specific" scores, that is, scores produced for particular market segments, including automotive lending and bankcard (credit card) lending. Industry-specific FICO scores produced for automotive lending are formulated differently than FICO scores produced for bankcard lending. Nearly every consumer will have different FICO scores depending upon which type of FICO score is ordered by a lender; for example, a consumer with several paid-in-full car loans but no reported credit card payment history will generally score better on a FICO automotive-enhanced score than on a FICO bankcard-enhanced score. FICO also produces several "general purpose" scores which are not tailored to any particular industry. Industry-specific FICO scores range from 250 to 900, whereas general purpose scores range from 300 to 850.

FICO scores are used by many mortgage lenders that use a risk-based system to determine the possibility that the borrower may default on financial obligations to the mortgage lender. For most mortgages originated in the United States, three credit scores are obtained on a consumer: a Beacon 5.0 score (Beacon is a trademark of FICO) which is calculated from the consumer's Equifax credit history, a FICO Model II score, which is calculated from the consumer's Experian credit history, and a Classic04 score, which is calculated from the consumer's Trans Union history.

Credit bureaus also often re-sell FICO scores directly to consumers, often a general-purpose FICO 8 score. Previously, the credit bureaus also sold their own credit scores which they developed themselves, and which did not require payment to FICO to utilize: Equifax's RISK score and Experian's PLUS score. However, as of 2018, these scores are no longer sold by the credit bureaus. Trans Union offers a Vantage 3.0 score for sale to consumers, which is a version of the VantageScore credit score. In addition, many large lenders, including the major credit card issuers, have developed their own proprietary scoring models.

Studies have shown scores to be predictive of risk in the underwriting of both credit and insurance. Some studies even suggest that most consumers are the beneficiaries of lower credit costs and insurance premiums due to the use of credit scores.

Usage of credit histories in employment screenings increased from 19% in 1996 to 42% in 2006. However, credit reports for employment screening purposes do not include credit scores.

Americans are entitled to one free credit report in every 12-month period from each of the three credit bureaus, but are not entitled to receive a free credit score. The three credit bureaus run Annualcreditreport.com, where users can get their free credit reports. Credit scores are available as an add-on feature of the report for a fee. If the consumer disputes an item on a credit report obtained using the free system, under the Fair Credit Reporting Act (FCRA), the credit bureaus have 45 days to investigate, rather than 30 days for reports obtained otherwise.

Alternatively, consumers wishing to obtain their credit scores can in some cases purchase them separately from the credit bureaus or can purchase their FICO score directly from FICO. Credit scores (including FICO scores) are also made available free by subscription to one of the many credit report monitoring services available from the credit bureaus or other third parties, although to actually get the scores free from most such services, one must use a credit card to sign up for a free trial subscription of the service and then cancel before the first monthly charge. Websites like WalletHub, Credit Sesame and Credit Karma provide free credit scores with no credit card required, using the TransUnion VantageScore 3.0 model. Credit.com uses the Experian VantageScore 3.0 model. Until March 2009, holders of credit cards issued by Washington Mutual were offered a free FICO score each month through the bank's Web site. (Chase, which took over Washington Mutual in 2008, discontinued this practice in March 2009.) Chase resumed the practice of offering a free FICO score in March 2010 of select card members to the exclusion of the majority of former WAMU card holders.

Under the Fair Credit Reporting Act, a consumer is entitled to a free credit report (but not a free credit score) within 60 days of any adverse action (e.g., being denied credit, or receiving substandard credit terms from a lender) taken as a result of their credit score. Under the Wall Street reform bill passed on 22 July 2010, a consumer is entitled to receive a free credit score if they are denied a loan or insurance due to their credit score.

In the United States, the median generic FICO score was 723 in 2006 and 711 in 2011. The performance definition of the FICO risk score (its stated design objective) is to predict the likelihood that a consumer will go 90 days past due or worse in the subsequent 24 months after the score has been calculated. The higher the consumer's score, the less likely he or she will go 90 days past due in the subsequent 24 months after the score has been calculated. Because different lending uses (mortgage, automobile, credit card) have different parameters, FICO algorithms are adjusted according to the predictability of that use. For this reason, a person might have a higher credit score for a revolving credit card debt when compared to a mortgage credit score taken at the same point in time.

== See also ==
- Alternative data
- Bank statement
- Credit bureau
- Credit history
- Credit reference
- Credit scorecards
- Algorithmic bias
