= CreditorWatch =

Australian financial services company

- Type: Private company
- Founded: Sydney, Australia (2010)
- Founder: Colin Porter
- Key people: Colin Porter, Patrick Coghlan and Dale Hurley
- Products: Credit reporting agency
- Services: Financial Analysis, Credit data collection, software, business information, credit reporting, information technology, business services, research
- Website: creditorwatch.com.au

CreditorWatch is an Australian financial services and software as a service (SaaS) company that provides software related to customer onboarding, customer management, financial analysis and risk mitigation.

CreditorWatch manages the credit files of all commercial businesses in Australia and is a credit reporting agency. The company aggregates data from a range of sources that include Australia's corporate regulator Australian Securities & Investments Commission (ASIC), ABR (Australian Business Register), courts, accounting software companies as well as adverse data provided by CreditorWatch users.

Businesses can use the service to perform financial checks on commercial entities, monitor client credit ratings, search potential debtors before offering credit and receive alerts when a default is lodged against a client. CreditorWatch also allows small businesses to expose clients who have failed to pay their invoices on time. CreditorWatch is an ASIC-approved information broker.

== History ==
CreditorWatch was founded in October 2010 by entrepreneur, Colin Porter. The company officially launched on 15 January 2011 after receiving recognition and coverage on Australia's Nine Network television program A Current Affair (Australia). Although initially self-funded, CreditorWatch secured an undisclosed amount of venture capital from Nightingale Ventures in January 2012.

In October 2017, CreditorWatch was acquired by InfoTrack, a Sydney-based, software as a service (SaaS) company.

6 December 2018 - Founder Colin Porter announces his departure from CreditorWatch at the end of December 2018. The business will be led by the current managing director Patrick Coghlan who will assume the role of CEO.

== Sources ==
- CreditorWatch exposes bad debtors for small business, by David Olsen, Dynamic Business, 5 November 2010.
- Dodgy debtors revealed, by Jo-Anne Hul, Smarter Business Ideas, 15 March 2011.
- New Credit Site Helping Small Business, Making Creditors Honest, by Rob Bates, Wentworth Courier, 27 April 2011.
- Spotting dodgy credit providers, by Oliver Milman, StartupSmart, 2 August 2011.
- Managing credit risks when dealing with SMEs, by Colin Porter, Credit Management in Australia, Volume 19, No.1 October 2011.
