= Creditsafe Group =

Norwegian credit report company

The Creditsafe Group
- Founded: 1997; 29 years ago
- Headquarters: Dublin, Ireland
- Area served: Europe; North America; Japan
- Website: Official website

The Creditsafe Group is a privately owned multinational provider of online company credit scores and credit report information. Founded in 1997, the company has expanded and now has operations in 16 countries across Europe, North America, and Japan, and claims to be the world’s most-used provider of company credit reports. Creditsafe now employs over 1,500 people and has a customer base in excess of 120,000 subscription customers worldwide.

== History ==
Creditsafe was founded in 1997 in Oslo, Norway with the idea of using the then-emerging technology of the internet to supply business information to a market of smaller and medium-sized businesses by selling over the telephone and delivering reports over the internet. Following the Norwegian launch Creditsafe established an office in Gothenburg Sweden in 1998 before moving to the UK in 2000. Creditsafe re-located the UK sales operation to Caerphilly in South Wales in 2002. In 2006 Creditsafe France was launched in Roubaix near Lille. Additional entities were later launched in Dublin in Ireland in 2007 by James Beadle, The Hague in the Netherlands in 2008, Berlin, Germany in 2010, Brussels, Belgium in 2011 and Turin in Italy in 2013. Creditsafe moved outside Europe in 2012 with the founding of Creditsafe United States in Allentown, Pennsylvania. Since launching in the USA, Creditsafe have now increased its US workforce by opening a new office in Tempe, Arizona Creditsafe established a shared service centre in Cardiff Bay, Wales in 2006 which has grown to support the sales operations around the world. In September 2016, Creditsafe set up its own operation in Japan. Creditsafe Japan has its offices in Fukuoka and Tokyo

== Current status ==
In each country in which it operates Creditsafe has a sales and customer service operation dealing with customers over the telephone and internet. Creditsafe employs over 1,500 people in its 27 offices in 16 countries it currently has just over 550,000 subscription users.

Creditsafe claims to be the world’s most-used provider of on-line company credit reports and estimates it will deliver over 110 million reports during 2016.
