= MIB Group =

Insurance industry fraud prevention data exchange

- Type: Mutual-benefit, not-for-profit corporation.
- Industry: Life insurance Health insurance
- Founded: 1902
- Headquarters: Braintree, Massachusetts, United States
- Area served: United States, Canada
- Products: MIB Cross Check, MIB Life Index
- Services: MIB Checking Service, Insurance Activity Index, Follow-Up Service Plan-F
- Subsidiaries: MIB, Inc., MIB Solutions, Inc.

MIB Group, Inc. or MIB (formerly the Medical Information Bureau) is a membership corporation owned by approximately 430 member insurance companies in the United States and Canada. Formed in 1902 and based in Braintree, Massachusetts, MIB provides services designed to protect insurers, policyholders, and applicants from attempts to conceal or omit information material to underwriting life & health insurance.

== Business model ==
MIB aims to uncover errors, omissions, misrepresentations on insurance applications to reduce fraud and anti-selection or adverse selection. MIB Group, Inc. is a member-owned corporation operating in the United States and Canada since 1902. MIB's services are used exclusively by MIB's member life insurance companies to assess an individual's risk and eligibility during the underwriting of life, health, disability income, critical illness, and long-term care insurance policies. These services "alert" underwriters to errors, omissions or misrepresentations made on insurance applications. The information must be verified by a reliable source prior to any underwriting action being taken.

The applicant authorizes MIB member insurance companies to search MIB, and as a result, the insurer may report certain medical conditions that impact a person's health or longevity, impacting risk assessment by the company. MIB's database does not contain actual medical records. Information is gathered from an underwriting investigation that may include: information from the applicant's medical questionnaire (application), relevant information from the applicant's attending physician, notice of adverse lab test results (non-specific flag as to values), and DMV information. When MIB member insurance companies report to MIB and receive information from MIB, it is done in codes to protect the consumer's privacy. MIB reports are regulated by the Fair Credit Reporting Act and consumers (US and Canadian) can request disclosure of their MIB report, should they have one, for free once each year (visit www.mib.com for complete disclosure information). Consumers can request an additional free copy if they have had an adverse action taken against them by an insurance company after applying for an insurance policy.

According to the Federal Trade Commission, MIB's member companies account for 99 percent of the individual life insurance policies and 80 percent of all health and disability policies issued in the United States and Canada. Under the FCRA, MIB is categorized as a "nationwide specialty consumer reporting agency" and must provide annual disclosure of an MIB report to all consumers who request their files.

== History ==
Once known as the "Medical Information Bureau", MIB was founded in 1902 by a group of life insurance companies with a desire to create an industry wide database of life insurance and other products. The goal was to share information as a way to protect applicants, insurers, and policyholders from omissions and fraud that prevented the sound and equitable underwriting of life insurance and other products.

From 1902 through 1945, MIB was governed by a sub-committee of the Association of Life Insurance Medical Directors of America (ALIMDA). In 1946, MIB was established as an unincorporated association under New York law and, in 1978, it became a Delaware membership corporation.
