= Swiss central credit information bureau =

Swiss credit organisation

The Swiss central credit information bureau, (German Zentralstelle für Kreditinformation (ZEK), French Centre d'informations de crédit), is a Swiss organisation centralizing and listing every credit attached to someone. Its goal is to check that a new credit or loan given to an individual lies within the financial capacities of the person concerned.
