= Cortera =

American business services company

Moody's Analytics
- Company type: Subsidiary
- Founded: Dedham, Massachusetts 1993
- Headquarters: Boca Raton, Florida
- Key people: James P. Swift, CEO; Michael Landis, CFO
- Products: Business information, services, research, software
- Number of employees: >100
- Parent: Moody's Analytics
- Website: pulse.moodysanalytics.com

Moody's Analytics, headquartered in Boca Raton, Florida, U.S., is a provider of credit information on businesses and corporations. The company provides business information with a database containing a number of private and public U.S. companies, analytics about each of those companies, and workflow software.

Typical users include business analysts, sales and marketing experts and credit & collections professionals who need to research their prospects, customers, and partners. Principal customers include transportation providers, manufacturers and wholesalers, telcos, banks, and other credit and financial institutions.

== History ==
Cortera was founded in 1993 as SRR Solutions by Northeastern University professor, Venkat Srinivasan, to provide credit & collections software. Over the years, the company raised tens of millions in venture capital funding, dabbled with the creation of an online B2B debt exchange and changed its name to eCredit in 1998. In December 2006 the company was acquired by an investment group that ultimately included Fidelity Ventures, Battery Ventures, and CIBC. The company name was changed from eCredit to Cortera in early 2008.

Moody's Analytics acquired Cortera in 2021.

== Products and services ==
- Business information
- Credit & Collections software
- Analytics
- B2B Payment Data

== Partners ==
The company primarily partners with other providers of business information to include their information in its software. Partners include:

- Bureau van Dijk
- Moodys Analytics
- LexisNexis Risk Solutions
