= TransUnion Canada =

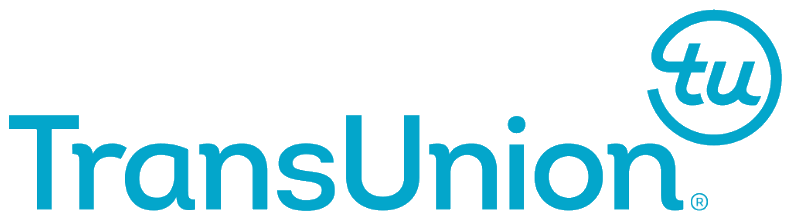
- Company type: Canadian division
- Industry: Credit risk assessment
- Headquarters: Burlington, Ontario
- Products: Credit reports
- Services: Credit information
- Owner: TransUnion
- Website: www.transunion.ca

Based in Burlington, Ontario, TransUnion Canada is one of two credit reporting agencies in Canada. Like their main competitor, Equifax Canada, they now market their credit reports directly to consumers, in addition to their core business of providing the reports to potential creditors.

== Services ==
Services offered by TransUnion Canada include:

- Disputes
- Fraud
- General
- Score
- Consumer disclosures

== Legal ==
In 2012 Consumer Protection B.C issued a compliance order against Trans Union to remove all data it held over 6 years. Trans Union refused to comply with the compliance order as it felt obligated to report "substantiated facts" longer than six years. TransUnion requested a review of the compliance order, which led to court action. The BC Supreme Court ruled in 2014 that the compliance order was lawful.

== See also ==
- Identity theft
- TransUnion
- Equifax Canada
