= CRIF High Mark Credit Information Services =

Indian credit bureau

- Type: Private limited company
- Industry: Financial Services
- Founded: 2005
- Headquarters: Mumbai, Maharashtra, India
- Key people: Larry Howell, Chairman Navin Chandani, CEO & MD
- Services: Credit bureau, risk analysis, software and decision analytics
- Website: crifhighmark.com

CRIF High Mark Credit Information Services Pvt. Ltd. is an RBI-approved credit bureau in India. It serves retail, agriculture and rural, MSME, commercial and microfinance.

The company was incorporated in 2005 and is based in Mumbai. It launched its credit bureau operations in 2010 and has a database of over 120+ crore credit records as of July 2018. CRIF High Mark covers nearly 38 crore unique borrowers as of October 2018. It manages the world's largest microfinance credit bureau database.

CRIF High Mark supports over 4,000 credit institutions, including over 1,000 cooperative banks and insurance companies, providing them with credit information, analytics and scoring, decision and software. In addition, it works with telecom service providers, credit rating agencies and SEBI-registered brokers. Consumers can also directly access their credit scores from CRIF High Mark. It records repayment history, defaults and frauds on loans and credit facilities extended to individuals or businesses across the country. These services help lenders to analyse the risk profile of the borrower before extending new credit and keep non-performing loans in check. Consumers can check their credit reports and credit scores from the company's website.

== History ==
CRIF High Mark Credit Information Services Private Limited was known as High Mark Credit Information Services Private Limited. High Mark was founded in 2007 by Dr. Anil Pandya. In 2014, CRIF, an Italy-based firm acquired majority stakes in the company and the name changed to CRIF High Mark.

CRIF (The Center for Research in International Finance) holds 70% in CRIF High Mark. CRIF High Mark's other shareholders include State Bank of India, Punjab National Bank, SIDBI, Edelweiss, Shriram City Union Finance, and Alpha, a microfinance institution consortium.

Established in 1988 in Bologna (Italy), CRIF is a global company specialising in the development and management of credit reporting, business information and decision support systems. The firm has an international presence operating in over 50 countries across four continents (Europe, America, Africa and Asia). It has experience delivering credit bureau solutions in countries like Italy, the Czech Republic, the Slovak Republic, Russia, Jamaica, Morocco, Benin, Vietnam, Bangladesh, Tajikistan and Indonesia. CRIF has been recognized amongst the top 100 FinTech by IDC Financial Insights.

=== Timeline ===
- 2005: Incorporated as a company
- 2007: Company started operations
- 2009: Received in-principle approval from RBI to set up as a credit information company amongst 13 applicants
- 2010: Received license from RBI to operate as a credit information company
- 2011: Launched India's first credit bureau services for microfinance industry (MFIs etc.) in March 2011
- 2012: Won Silver Award at SKOCH Digital Inclusion 2012 for the company’s work towards digital financial inclusion
- 2014: CRIF, the earlier strategic investor, acquires a majority stake in the Financial Inclusion category for setting up India's first Microfinance Credit Bureau.
- 2016: The sophisticated dedupe engine, OneIdentii, developed by CRIF High Mark, was recognized as the "most promising innovation" at the Technoviti Awards 2016
- 2016: CRIF launches a new centre for predictive analytics and decision solutions in Pune to support clients in Banking, Financial Services, Insurance and Telecom sectors in India, West and South-East Asia
- 2016: Crossed 100 million credit decisions mark for the Microfinance industry
- 2019: Sherlock Lending, an anti-fraud solution from CRIF High Mark, wins leading innovation award at Technoviti 2019

== CRIF Credit Score ==
CRIF High Mark provides two types of credit scores - one for individual consumer called a Personal Credit Score and another for businesses called a Business Credit Score or Commercial Credit Score. The CRIF Credit score range is from 300 to 900, where a score close to 300 is considered to be poor while 900 is the best possible score. A score of over 700 is generally considered good. The Reserve Bank of India (RBI) has mandated credit bureaus in India to give a full credit report free of charge to each customer every year. A consumer can check its own credit score free once in a year from CRIF High Mark's website.

== Products and services ==
CRIF High Mark provides credit information to credit institutions such as banks and NBFCs, telecom, and insurance companies, credit rating agencies, Sebi-registered brokers and to the consumers. The company also provides risk management solutions, analytics, decision support and software solutions to its clients in these sectors. It also offers data quality management services that include data quality profiling, data deduplication, and data quality enhancement, as well as address quality assessment, verification, and improvement. CRIF High Mark also provides market insight reports to help institutions benchmark themselves against competition and understand the penetration, delinquencies, and growth.

== CRIF High Mark in the news ==
- Mar 2019: CRIF High Mark, CreditVidya Seal First-of-its-kind Partnership in India to provide lenders with credit scoring even for new-to-credit and 'thin-file' customers.
- Dec 2018: IDBI appointed CRIF High Mark Credit Information Services to receive early warning signals (EWS) solution on its retail borrowers on a pilot basis. The bank is also monitoring the accounts on a weekly basis through its credit monitoring group
- Jul 2018: Monexo, the first peer-to-peer lending company in India has tied-up with CRIF to access credit scores and other relevant financial data to aid in the loan disbursement decision making process
- June 2018: OML Technologies, a peer-to-peer lending company in India, has collaborated with CRIF High Mark to use its algorithm to ascertain the actuarial risk involved in providing credit to a borrower on the platform.
