= Schufa =

German private credit bureau

Coordinates: 50.042471°N 8.205454°E

Schufa Holding AG
- Type: Aktiengesellschaft
- Industry: Credit bureau
- Founded: 1927
- Headquarters: Wiesbaden, Germany
- Key people: Tanja Birkholz (Chairwoman of the board of directors); Christian Polenz (Chairman of the supervisory board)
- Website: schufa.de

Schufa Holding AG (German: Schutzgemeinschaft für allgemeine Kreditsicherung; English: Protection association for general credit protection), proper spelling SCHUFA, is a German private credit bureau supported by creditors. It has its headquarters in Wiesbaden.

The primary purpose of SCHUFA is to protect its business partners from credit risks by providing creditworthiness data. Additionally, it aims to prevent consumer over-indebtedness by ensuring that loans and installment plans are granted based on a reliable assessment of the borrower's ability to pay.

As of 2026, SCHUFA maintains over 1.2 billion records on 69 million natural persons and 6.6 million companies. The company processes approximately 232 million credit inquiries and updates annually. SCHUFA employs over 1,000 people and reported annual sales of approximately €293 million. According to company data, over 90% of individuals in the database have exclusively positive records, contributing to a stable credit market with a 98.1% successful repayment rate for consumer loans.

== History ==
At the beginning of the 20th century, the Berlin city electric company (BEWAG) offered household appliances for sale on installment plans. At the time, the financing was compared with electric bills and only regularly paying customers would be supplied with appliances. This started a system for assessing payment behavior.

With the experience they gained from BEWAG, Walter and Kurt Meyer, along with Robert Kauffmann established the Schutzgemeinschaft für Absatzfinanzierung (English: Protective Association for Sales Financing) in 1927. Soon after, 13 more regional credit bureaus were formed in Germany. In 1952, the 13 West German credit bureaus were merged into Bundes-Schufa e. V.

Bundes-Schufa e. V. changed its name in 2000 to Schufa Holding AG and in 2002 acquired the shares of the eight regional credit bureaus. The board of Schufa Holding AG is made up of three members, and the supervisory board has nine members, three of which are Schufa employees.

In March 2026, SCHUFA updated its scoring system to increase transparency and adapt to changing consumer habits, such as the increased use of micro-loans and digital comparison platforms. The new model replaced the previous percentage-based system with a scale from 100 to 999 points. It was designed to provide greater traceability by allowing consumers and companies to see the same score, which is calculated based on twelve specific weighted criteria.

== Data protection ==
In the 1970s, Schufa migrated to electronic records, which then fell under the German Federal Data Protection Act when it came into force in 1979.

On a case brought by the Berlin consumer protection society (Verbraucherschutzverein), the Federal Court of Justice of Germany gave the so-called "Schufa decision", ruling that personal data could not be given to Schufa without the customer's consent. This regulation was rendered obsolete by the introduction of the General Data Protection Regulation (GDPR), which states that the legitimate interest of the company alone is sufficient to transfer data to Schufa.

== Concerns and criticisms ==
=== Data protection ===
Responding to Schufa's expansion into new areas of business such as the housing and insurance sectors, as well as debt collection, the German Data Protection Office and several regional Data Protection Officers issued a joint press statement on 15 May 2003 in which they warned against the risk that Schufa was evolving into a privately controlled central database. According to the joint press statement, each additional data source was moving ever closer "to a detailed Personality Profile of the individuals affected". This would make a reality of the "transparent citizen".

In December 2023, the European Court of Justice (ECJ) further clarified the application of the GDPR regarding automated scoring. The court ruled that the calculation of a credit score by a bureau like SCHUFA constitutes an "automated individual decision" if third parties, such as banks, rely primarily on that score for their decision-making. Consequently, under Article 15 of the GDPR, SCHUFA is required to provide consumers with meaningful information about the logic involved, including the specific criteria used and their weighting. This judgment was hailed by consumer protection groups, such as the Federation of German Consumer Organisations (vzbv), as a milestone for transparency and data sovereignty.

=== Wrong data ===
In 2009 the German Ministry for Consumer Protection (Bundesverbraucherschutzministerium) undertook a study of the error rates of various credit bureaus, and identified a very high error rate at Schufa.

Consumer watchdog Stiftung Warentest had already conducted an investigation in 2003 which concluded that many items (69%) of Schufa data were incomplete, out of date, or wrong. In 2010 the organisation checked a new sample and concluded that 1% of the data held by Schufa were wrong, 8% were out of date and 28% were incomplete. The Schufa business model is clearly based on a so-called "reciprocity principle" whereby the company's business partners are contractually required to report data updates.
