= Compuscan =

South African credit bureau

- Industry: finance, credit
- Founded: 1994; 32 years ago
- Headquarters: Technopark Stellenbosch, South Africa
- Key people: Tasmin Lenisa, CEO
- Number of employees: 400

Compuscan is a South African credit bureau that provides consumer and commercial credit information within South Africa and other African nations.

== History ==
Founded in 1994 and headquartered in Stellenbosch, South Africa, Compuscan is a subsidiary of South African-based Compuscan Information Technologies. The company, which was originally focused on providing credit history reporting for microcredit transactions, is among South Africa's leading credit bureaus and is a member of the nation's Credit Bureau Association. The company also provides microcredit reporting services in the neighboring republics of Botswana and Namibia.

In 2006, Compuscan was selected by the Bank of Uganda to build the first-ever Ugandan Credit Reference Bureau. This system, which was formally introduced in 2008, required Ugandan financial institutions to issue smart cards to their borrowers as part of a borrower identification program.

== Compuscan South Africa ==
In South Africa, Compuscan is a registered credit bureau in terms of the National Credit Act (NCA). As per the NCA, all credit bureaus in South Africa are to supply South African citizens with one free credit report per year. The company also markets credit bureau services to businesses in the credit and financial industries; as well as training services, marketing services, analytics consultancy and loyalty and rewards offerings to a various other industries.
