= TransUnion =

American consumer credit reporting agency

- Formerly: TransUnion Holding Company, Inc.
- Type: Public
- Traded as: NYSE: TRU; S&P 400 component
- Industry: Information technology
- Founded: February 8, 1968; 58 years ago
- Headquarters: Chicago, Illinois, U.S.
- Area served: Worldwide
- Key people: Christopher Cartwright (President & CEO)
- Products: Credit reports
- Services: Credit information
- Revenue: ▲US$4.58 billion (2025)
- Net income: ▲US$455 million (2025)
- Number of employees: 13,400 (2024)
- Website: www.transunion.com

TransUnion is an American consumer credit reporting agency. TransUnion collects and aggregates information on over one billion individual consumers in over thirty countries including "200 million files profiling nearly every credit-active consumer in the United States". Its customers include over 65,000 businesses. Based in Chicago, Illinois, TransUnion's 2014 revenue was US$1.3 billion. It is the smallest of the three largest credit agencies, along with Experian and Equifax (known as the "Big Three").

TransUnion also markets credit reports and other credit and fraud-protection products directly to consumers. Like all credit reporting agencies, the company is required by U.S. law to provide consumers with one free credit report every year.

== History ==
TransUnion was originally formed in 1968 as a holding company for Union Tank Car Company, making TransUnion a descendant of Standard Oil through Union Tank Car Company. The following year, it acquired the Credit Bureau of Cook County, which possessed and maintained 3.6 million credit accounts. In 1981, a Chicago-based holding company, The Marmon Group, acquired TransUnion for approximately $688 million.

In 2010, Goldman Sachs Capital Partners and Advent International acquired it from Madison Dearborn Partners and the Pritzker family. In 2014, TransUnion acquired Hank Asher's data company TLO. On June 25, 2015, TransUnion became a publicly traded company, trading under the symbol TRU.

TransUnion eventually began to offer products and services for both businesses and consumers. For businesses, TransUnion updated its traditional credit score offering to include trended data that helps predict consumer repayment and debt behavior. This product, referred to as CreditVision, launched in October 2013. Its SmartMove™ service facilitates credit and background checks for landlords. The service also provides credit and background checks for partner companies, such as RentSpree.

In September 2013, the company acquired eScan Data Systems of Austin, Texas, to provide post-service eligibility determination support to hospitals and healthcare systems. The technology was integrated into TransUnion's ClearIQ platform, which tracks patients demographic and insurance related information to support benefit verification. In November 2013, TransUnion acquired TLO LLC, a company that leverages data in support of its investigative and risk management tools. Its TLOxp technology aggregates data sets and uses a proprietary algorithm to uncover relationships between data. TLOxp also allows licensed investigators and law enforcement professionals to access personally identifiable information from credit header data.

In 2014, a TransUnion analysis found that reporting rental payment information to credit bureaus can positively affect credit scores. As a result, TransUnion initiated a service called ResidentCredit, making it easy for property owners to report data about their tenants on a monthly basis. These reports include the amount each tenant pays, the timeliness of their last payment, and any remaining balance the tenant currently owes. As a result, some companies have started reporting rent payment information to TransUnion.

In 2015, TransUnion acquired Trustev, a digital verification company specializing in online fraud for $21 million, minus debts. In 2017, TransUnion acquired FactorTrust, a consumer reporting agency specializing in alternative credit data. In mid-April 2018, TransUnion announced it intended to buy UK-based CallCredit Information Group for $1.4 billion, subject to regulatory approval. In December 2021, TransUnion completed the acquisitions of Neustar, initially announced in September 2021 for $3.1 billion, and Sontiq which included IdentityForce, initially announced in October 2021 for $638 million. In February 2023, TransUnion announced it was rebranding its "thousands of existing B2B products into seven business lines." These include: TruAudience, TruValidate, TruContact (all based on former offerings from Neustar), TruVision, TruIQ, TruEmpower, and TruLookup.

In January 2025, TransUnion acquired a majority stake in Trans Union de México in a deal worth roughly $662 million and increasing its ownership from 26% to 94%, according to an official statement.

== Legal and regulatory issues ==
In 2003, Judy Thomas of Klamath Falls, Oregon, was awarded $5.3 million in a successful lawsuit against TransUnion. The award was made on the grounds that it took her six years to get TransUnion to remove incorrect information in her credit report.

In 2006, after spending two years trying to correct erroneous credit information that resulted from being a victim of identity theft, a fraud victim named Sloan filed suit against all three of the US's largest credit agencies. TransUnion and Experian settled out of court for an undisclosed amount. In Sloan v. Equifax, a jury awarded Sloan $351,000. "She wrote letters. She called them. They saw the problem. They just didn't fix it," said her attorney, A. Hugo Blankingship III. TransUnion has also been criticized for concealing charges. Many users complained of not being aware of a $17.95/month charge for holding a TransUnion account.

In March 2015, following a settlement with the New York Attorney-General, TransUnion, along with other credit reporting companies, Experian and Equifax, agreed to help consumers with errors and red flags on credit reports. Under the new settlement, credit-reporting firms are required to use trained employees to respond when a consumer flags a mistake on their file. These employees are responsible for communicating with the lender and resolving the dispute.

In January 2017, TransUnion was fined $5.5 million and ordered to pay $17.6 million in restitution, along with Equifax, by the Consumer Financial Protection Bureau (CFPB). The federal agency fined the companies "for deceiving consumers about the usefulness and actual cost of credit scores they sold to consumers". The CFPB also said the companies "lured consumers into costly recurring payments for credit-related products with false promises".

In June 2017, a California jury ruled against TransUnion with a $60 million verdict in the largest Fair Credit Reporting Act (FCRA) verdict in history. The San Francisco federal court jury awarded $60 million in damages to consumers who were falsely reported on a government list of terrorists and other security threats. The plaintiffs' team of attorneys at Francis & Mailman, P.C. partnered with another California-based firm in the class action.

Credit bureaus had the most complaints of all companies filed with the CFPB by consumers in 2018, with 34% of all complaints directed at TransUnion, Equifax, and Experian that year. Following up on the 2017 FCRA ruling, in April 2022, the Consumer Financial Protection Bureau (CFPB) said TransUnion is "incapable of operating its businesses lawfully".

== Security issues ==
On 13 October 2017, the website for TransUnion's Central American division was reported to have been redirecting visitors to websites that attempted drive-by downloads of malware disguised as Adobe Flash updates. The attack had been performed by hijacking third-party analytics JavaScript from Digital River brand FireClick.

On 17 March 2022, TransUnion South Africa disclosed that hackers breached one of their servers and allegedly stole data of 54 million customers, demanding a ransom to not release it, the group N4ughtysecTU claims responsibility.

== See also ==
- Equifax
- Experian
- TransUnion Canada
- TransUnion CIBIL
