= United States v. Clark =

Court case

United States of America v. Clark
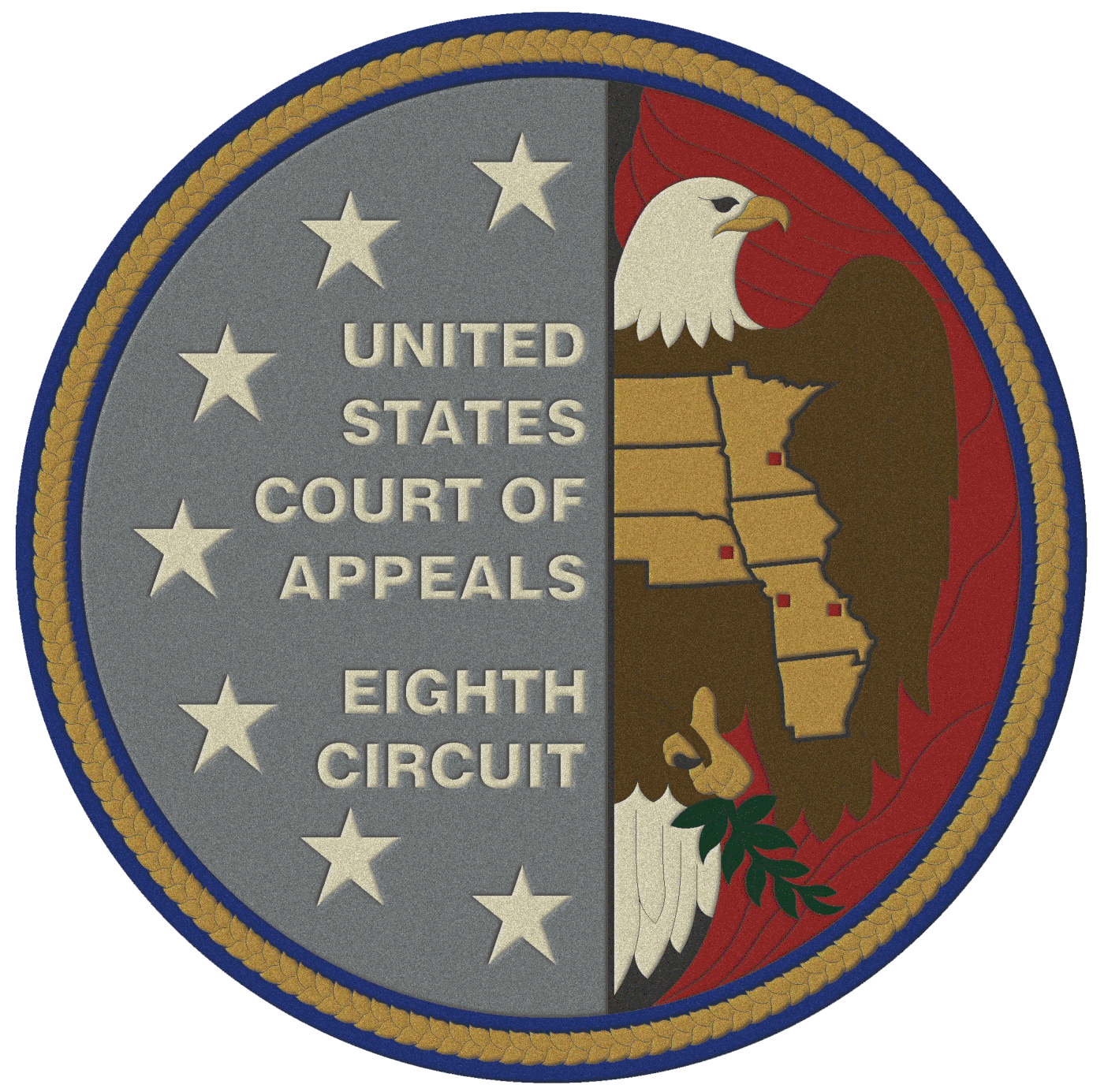
- Court: United States Court of Appeals, Eighth Circuit
- Full case name: United States v. Clark
- Decided: February 10, 2012
- Citations: United States of America, Appellee, v. Jason Elliott Clark, Appellant (No. 11–2270)

Court membership
- Judges sitting: Wollman, Murphy and Benton

United States of America v. Clark (U.S vs. Clark, 11-2270) (United States Court of Appeals, Eighth Circuit 2012) is the name of a lawsuit against Jason Elliott Clark by the U.S. government based on identity theft, bank fraud and conspiracy. This was an appeal from the United States District Court for the District of Minnesota. Clark appealed his conviction for aggravated identity theft based on the sufficiency of the evidence and the court's admission of certain prior acts of evidence.

== Case summary ==
Jason Elliott Clark along with, Marcus Benson, Jason Richard Hansen, and Nou Thoa were indicted for stealing identities and subsequently stealing more than $150,000 from victims. Clark was charged with two counts of bank fraud and one count of aggravated identity theft. Clark and his partners in crime conspired to obtain funds from the accounts of others by creating counterfeit checks including stolen bank routing and account numbers. Clark used personally identifiable information with the intent to commit bank fraud and access device fraud. The bank fraud charges were related to the unlawful withdrawals and transfer of money from the accounts of the victims. Full conviction would have resulted in a maximum penalty of 30 years for conspiracy, 30 years for each count of bank fraud, 15 years for identity theft, 10 years for each count of access device fraud, and two years on each aggravated identity theft count. Ultimately Clark was sentenced to 48 months in prison based on bank fraud conspiracy under 18 U.S.C. § 1349, bank fraud (two counts) under 18 U.S.C. § 1344, identity theft under18 U.S.C. § 1028 and aggravated identity theft under 18 U.S.C. § 1028(a)(1).

== Crime details ==
The conspiracy was led by Benson, while Clark, Hansen and Thoa were co-conspirators. Benson provided fraudulent checks which the co-conspirators deposited into his personal bank account. The money was then withdrawn, the bulk of it sent to Benson and a small portion kept by the co-conspirators as payment for the services provided. Benson, Clark and Hanson originally became friends when working together at an electronics store. Hansen left this job and began working as an analyst for a mortgage broker. During his employment, he decided to use confidential personally identifiable information including social security numbers, dates of birth, addresses, and account numbers of individuals applying for mortgage loans. Benson at the same time also started his own mortgage loan brokerage. Hansen contacted Benson through Clark to offer him this personal information, claiming they were mortgage leads. Ultimately Benson used the confidential personally identifiable information to obtain the fraudulent checks. Hansen also approached Thao for assistance with the check-cashing scheme. In September 2007, Clark deposited a check from the victim (D.R.O) for $10,250 and then again for $145,000; supposedly as payment for a property that Clark owned and was now selling. Wells Fargo initiated an investigation where the initial suspicion was that Clark was a fraud victim. It turned out quite the opposite later when they received a testimony from D.R.O that they had in fact never sent any money to Clark. Clark subsequently admitted to getting the checks from Benson, withdrawing the funds, and sending him the vast majority of the funds. Officers arrested Benson and executed a consent search of his home where they found fraudulent ID documents, credit cards, and skimmers as well as photographs of Clark and the other co-defendants, Hansen and Thao.

== Trial and appeal ==
Based on 18 U.S.C. § 1028(a)(1), the government must prove that the defendant knew that the identity was associated with a real person rather than being fabricated. Clark argued that the evidence was insufficient for a reasonable juror to find beyond a reasonable doubt that Clark knew that the ID on the check belonged to an actual person. The court concluded that a reasonable juror could infer that Clark (as a bank account holder and prior identity thief) knew that banks only open accounts and give credit to real people.

=== Double jeopardy ===
A defendant may move for judgment of acquittal after the government closes its evidence or all evidence under rule 23 of the Federal Rules of Criminal Procedure. Clark attempted to gain acquittal on identity theft and aggravated identity theft. Clark argued that sections 18 U.S.C. § 1028A and 18 U.S.C. § 1028(a)(7) of US code proscribe to the same offense. The Double Jeopardy Clause of the Fifth Amendment to the United States Constitution would prohibit a sentence for both identity theft and aggravated identity theft. In United States v. Felix 503 U.S. 378 (1992), it was ruled that an offense and conspiracy to commit that offense are not the same; fundamentally one cannot be tried twice for the same offense. In this case however, the court decided that section 18 U.S.C. § 1028(b)(2) allows for punishment for both identity theft and aggravated identity theft and that the intent of the United States Congress is to impose multiple punishments for both identity theft and aggravated identity theft, as both are separate statutes. In Blockburger v. United States, 284 U.S. 299 (1932), it was confirmed that multiple punishments for convictions that fall under separate statutes do not violate the double jeopardy clause. The motion of judgment of acquittal was denied, citing Chase applying the same standard of review to the district.

=== Character evidence ===
During the trial, the district court brought up a case from 2001 where Clark pleaded guilty for identity theft. Clark argued that this reference to prior bad acts was not admissible as character evidence. The court concluded that evidence of prior bad actions was in fact admissible under exceptions of rule 404(b) of the Federal Rules of Evidence for limited purposes such as intent, knowledge or absence of mistake as long as it was relevant to a material issue. Since Clark presented a defense that he acted in good faith when depositing these checks, his knowledge and intent were considered an issue. Rule 404 (b) also permits the inclusion of past bad acts when the prior act is similar and not too remote in time from the current crime. The motion for admission of prior acts was also denied. Citing Ruiz-Estrada, the court stated that they would only reverse the decision when such evidence had no bearing on the case and was primarily being used to prove that the defendant had the propensity to commit a criminal act. Citing Balanga, the court concluded that a reasonable juror could have found the defendant guilty of the charged conduct beyond a reasonable doubt. The court furthered that the conviction can be based on both circumstantial and direct evidence, citing Erdman.

Clark ultimately received a total sentence of 48 months in jail – 24 months for bank fraud and 24 months for aggravated identity theft.

== Legal details: identity theft and bank fraud ==
Identity theft is usually not committed as an end in itself but rather as a means of a facilitating some other crime like financial or real property theft. Identity theft was not a federal crime in the US until 1998 when the Identity Theft and Assumption Deterrence Act became effective. Previously only credit granting agencies who suffered monetary losses were considered victims. With the passing of this act it was the first time that the person whose ID was stolen was viewed as the actual victim.

Under 18 U.S.C. § 1028 the production of an unlawful identification document, authentication features or false identification, possesses such a document is committing a crime and will be appropriately punished per stated consequences. One of the largest most sophisticated identity theft cases in the US involved 111 people who used skimming devices to swipe and steal consumer credit card information at retail and food establishments. It is estimated that identity theft costs the US Internal Revenue Service about $5.2 Billion in 2011.

Check fraud in the US cost American consumers and banks about $20 billion in 2010 and some argue that this system (checks) should have been eliminated a long time ago. Not only does eliminating checks reduce the probability of fraud but also reduce the costs of processing. Bank fraud in the US is covered under 18 U.S.C. § 1344 and refers to any attempt to defraud a financial institution for the purpose of obtaining money, funds, credits, assets or other property owned by the financial institution.

As most financial systems these days are electronic bank fraud crimes are often executed through computer systems and networks. Under 18 U.S.C. § 1030(4) exceeding authorization to a computer system knowingly with the intent to defraud and obtain anything of value is also illegal. Damaging a bank computer is also an offense under 18 U.S.C. § 1030(a)(5).

== Fraud prevention - data mining and pattern identification ==
Companies are taking advantage of security information and event management systems in conjunction with large data mining and pattern identification techniques to reduce the risk of financial fraud. Patterns of fraud and inappropriate transactions must be discerned from normal or acceptable user activity. Although the above case focuses on check fraud, credit card fraud has typically been the most prevalent type of identity theft facilitated fraud. Banks have employed real-time monitoring based on rule based engines however due to the dynamic nature of fraud, the bank's own fraud trends, the customer's patterns and the exchange of data between financial institutions has to be just as flexible.

== Summary of laws applied ==
- 18 U.S.C. § 1028(a)(1): Fraud and related activity in connection with identification documents, authentication features, and information
- 18 U.S.C. § 1028(a)(7): Fraud and related activity in connection with identification documents, authentication features, and information
- 18 U.S.C. § 1028(b)(2): Fraud and related activity in connection with identification documents, authentication features, and information
- 18 U.S.C. § 1028A: Aggravated identity theft
- 18 U.S.C. § 1344: Bank fraud
- 18 U.S.C. § 1349: Attempt and conspiracy

== See also ==
- Bank fraud
- Check fraud
- Check washing
- Civil Identity Program of the Americas
- Credit card fraud
- Fair and Accurate Credit Transactions Act
- Fair Credit Billing Act
- Fair Credit Reporting Act
- Ghosting (identity theft)
- Hacking
- Identity document forgery
- Identity fraud
- Wireless identity theft
