= Access to Justice Act =

Access to Justice Act may refer to

- Access to Justice Act 1999, an Act of the Parliament of the UK
- Equal Access to Justice Act, US federal judiciary legislation
- Servicemember's Access to Justice Act, US federal defense and national security legislation
