= National Association of Counties =

Group of U.S. local county governments

- Abbreviation: NACo
- Formation: 1935
- Type: non-governmental organization
- Location: Washington, D.C.
- Executive Director President: Matthew Chase; Denise Winfrey
- Website: naco.org

The National Association of Counties (NACo) is an organization that represents county governments in the United States. It is the only national organization that represents county governments in the United States.

Founded in 1935, NACo provides services to the nation's 3,069 counties.

NACo's membership totals more than 2,350 counties, representing more than 80 percent of the nation's population.

With its headquarters on Capitol Hill, NACo is a full-service organization that provides services to its members. These include legislative, research, technical and public affairs assistance, as well as enterprise services. The association acts as a liaison with other levels of government, works to improve public understanding of counties, serves as a national advocate for counties. NACo is involved in a number of special projects that deal with such issues as homeland security, drug abuse, and broader access to health care.

County officials and their staffs also participate through NACo's affiliates. These organizations are composed of officials who share similar responsibilities, interests, or knowledge areas. To keep county officials informed, NACo publishes a biweekly newspaper, County News, with a circulation of 29,000, that focuses on issues and actions in Washington, D.C., and throughout the country.

NACo's committees, whose members include county officials from every region of the country, are charged on an annual basis with evaluating issues and policies. The policy development process leads to the publication of the American County Platform, which NACo uses as a guide to deliver county government's message to the Administration, Congress and the American public.

NACo is considered part of the "Big Seven", a group of organizations that represent local and state government in the United States.

== Advocacy ==
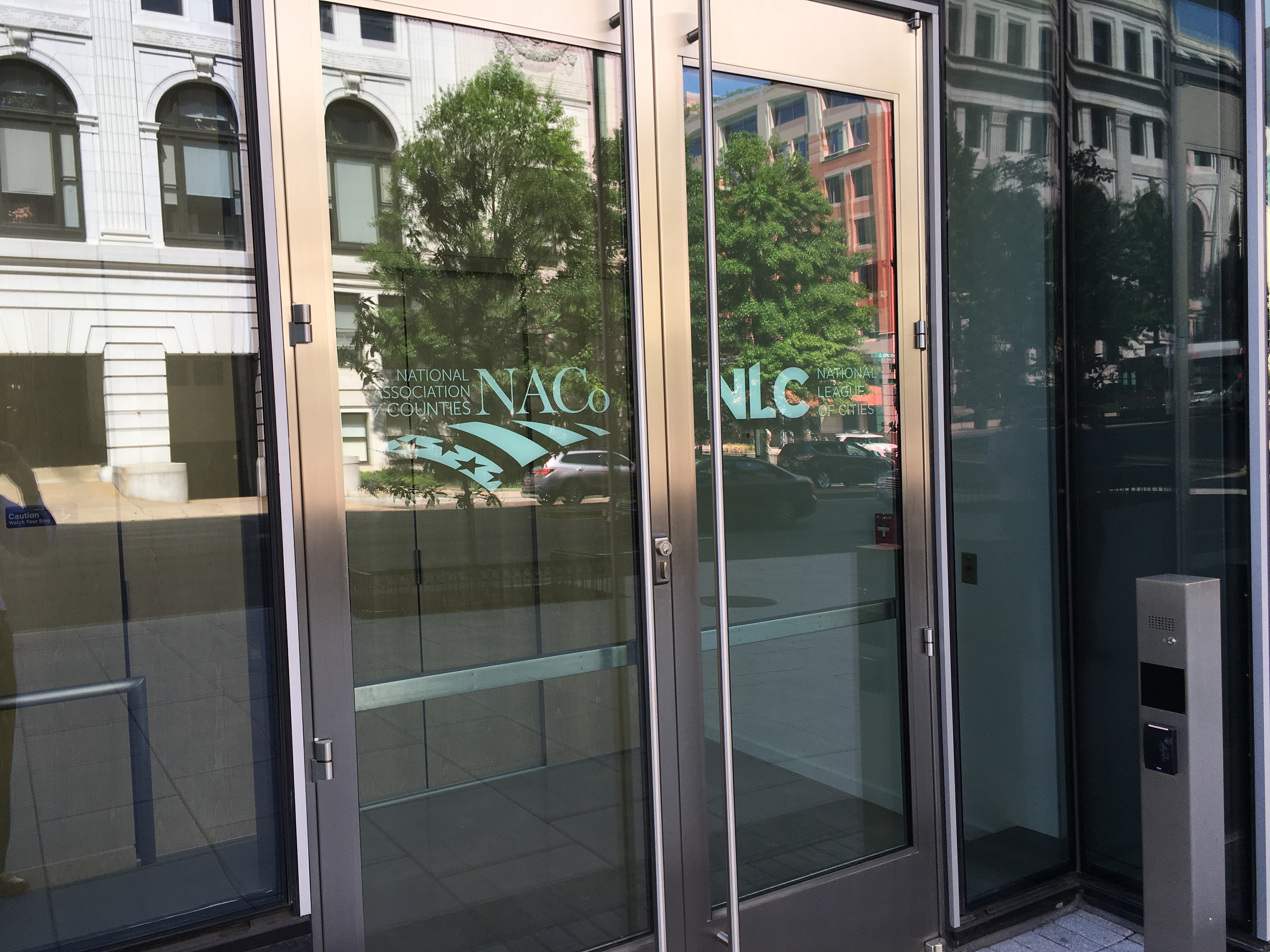
National Association of Counties and National League of Cities doorway in Washington, D.C.

NACo strongly supported the Open Book on Equal Access to Justice Act (H.R. 2919; 113th Congress), a bill that would require the Administrative Conference of the United States (ACUS) to prepare a report each year on the amount of fees and other expenses awarded by federal courts to nonfederal entities when they prevail in a case against the United States. The bill would amend the Equal Access to Justice Act. NACo stated that it supported the bill because it "strives to create a balance between ensuring access to courts for individuals, small businesses, and non-profit organizations in suits against the federal government and preventing abuses of the system." According to NACo, the "legislation provides necessary transparency in an effort to stop EAJA abuses," but allows "veterans, social security claimants, individuals, and small businesses" to "still enjoy full access to EAJA funds."

NACo supported the Stopping Tax Offenders and Prosecuting Identity Theft Act of 2013 (H.R. 744; 113th Congress), a bill that would increase the penalties on identity thieves in the United States and change the definition of identity theft to include businesses and organizations instead of just individuals. NACo placed on their agenda their intention to "urge Congress to pass legislation supporting action to reduce tax crimes and identity theft" such as H.R. 744.

== See also ==
- The Council of State Governments
- National Center for State Courts
- National Conference of State Legislatures
- National League of Cities
