= Orantes-Hernandez injunction =

The Orantes-Hernandez injunction is a federal court decision stemming from an initial 1982 class-action lawsuit, Orantes-Hernandez v. Smith, filed by a group of Salvadoran immigrants that had been mistreated while in custody of the Immigration and Naturalization Service in the United States. This class-action lawsuit was filed against U.S. immigration authorities for violating rights of Salvadorans, specifically in detention centers. The injunction, a legal order to stop certain behaviors, listed several practices that had been taking place in the treatment of detainees, citing them as "prohibited acts". These included misinforming or failing to inform immigrants of their right to apply for political asylum, using coercive tactics to encourage Salvadorans to elect voluntary departure, and denying detainees access to counsel. Colloquially known as the Orantes-Hernandez injunction, these legal proceedings have been both appealed and upheld in court various times since the initial decision in 1982.

== Historical context ==
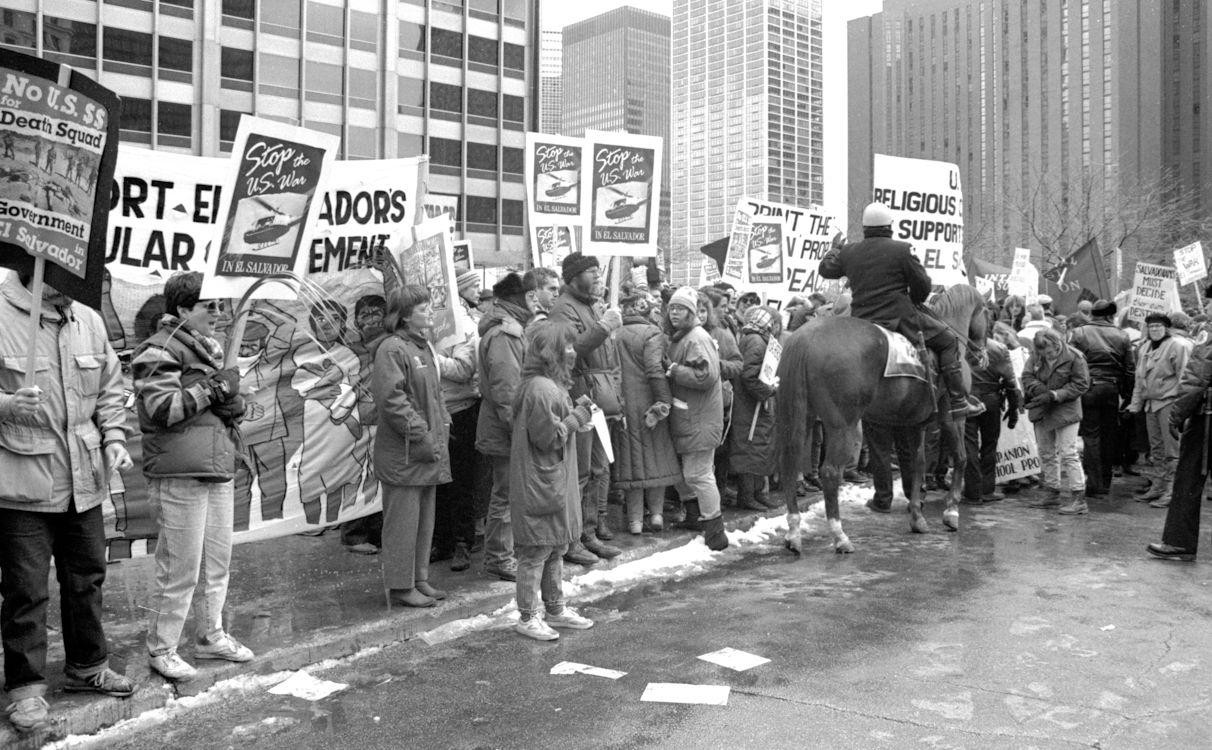
Protest during Salvadoran Civil War in Chicago

US Ambassadors view destruction in El Salvador from the Civil War

Through the 1950s and 60s, there were many immigrants coming from El Salvador to the United States, but the number was insignificant in comparison to other Latin American countries. Those that chose to immigrate predominately came from wealthy backgrounds in El Salvador, but many were forced to work in manual labor jobs in the United States. With the start of the Salvadoran civil war in 1979 and ensuing competition for land and resources within El Salvador, there was a dramatic increase in immigration to various countries, including the United States. The number of Salvadoran immigrants in the U.S. jumped from 213,000 in the early 1980s to 565,000 in the early 1990s. Prior to the civil war, many Salvadoran immigrants in the United States were undocumented with few to no issues. Aside from those who were pursuing study or skilled professions, the majority of immigrants were able to work in manual labor with no documents and be seemingly untraced. However, with the spike in Salvadoran migration, it became increasingly more important to have proper documentation, as government and immigration officials became more wary of the Salvadoran natives. As more Salvadorans immigrated to the United States, it became more difficult for them to gain legal resident status. Though previously many immigrants from countries experiencing war or civil unrest qualified as refugees by definition of being "persecuted or fear persecution due to race, religion, nationality, political opinion, or membership in a particular social group", the U.S. chose to classify Salvadorans as voluntary economic immigrants. The division in the United States about the classification of Salvadorans caused controversy for several years. The work of several large groups of activists and lobbyists eventually influenced the government to recognize that the influx of immigration from El Salvador was politically driven. However, it was still difficult for Salvadorans to receive refugee status. During the 1980s, political asylum was granted to less than 2% of applicants from El Salvador. Instead, most Salvadorans taken into custody by Immigration and Naturalization Services were denied information about political asylum to ensure they did not have the opportunity to apply. The coercive tactics used to prevent Salvadorans from seeking asylum led to a class-action lawsuit against the INS.

== Orantes-Hernandez v. Smith (1982) ==
In 1982, in response to unfair treatment in detention centers, a group of Salvadoran immigrants filed a class-action lawsuit against the U.S. government, and Immigration & Naturalization Services. The plaintiffs in this class-action were 19 Salvadoran refugees including Crosby Wilfredo Orantes-Hernandez, all of whom had been detained by the INS. The defendants were William French Smith, the Attorney General of the United States, and the Immigration and Naturalization Service. The lawsuit specifically listed discriminatory behaviors of the INS agents in detention centers. This included as coercive tactics, failure to inform detainees of rights to counsel, political asylum, and deportation hearings, and the placing detainees in solitary confinement. Plaintiffs also provided evidence that the conditions in El Salvador they would be subjected to if deported would endanger their lives or severely impact their ability to live freely, meeting the requirements for political asylum. As a result of this lawsuit, judge David Kenyon issued a preliminary injunction as a decision while the case awaited trial, which would eventually take place from 1985 to 1987. The preliminary injunction prohibited the previous behavior of INS officials, and required that Salvadoran immigrants in custody be provided information about their eligibility for political asylum, as well as access to counsel.

== Orantes-Hernandez v. Meese (1988) ==
When the initial class-action lawsuit went to trial, it lasted several years and included approximately 175 witnesses who testified of the unfair treatment of Salvadoran detainees. This case became an expansion of the previous Orantes-Hernandez v. Smith, including more evidence and testimony in court as it was tried. There had also been a change in the attorney general at the time, meaning Edwin Meese III was listed as the defendant during this trial. As a result of the trial, judge Kenyon issued a permanent injunction, similar to the preliminary injunction, that listed specific obligatory procedures for INS agents in the process of detaining, questioning, and deporting Salvadoran immigrants. The injunction specifically mandated that Salvadorans receive access to telephones, legal service lists, and information about applying for asylum. An additional requirement was that they not be transferred to other facilities for at least 7 days after detention without representation from legal counsel.

== Orantes-Hernandez v. Thornburgh (1990) ==
In 1990, the government, the defendant from the previous class-action lawsuit, appealed judge Kenyon's decision in the district court. The Ninth Circuit Court of Appeals investigated whether or not there had been grounds to issue the permanent injunction of Orantes-Hernandez v. Meese. In order to do so, the court examined testimonies of INS agents and members of the initial class-action lawsuit both before and after the preliminary injunction. The appellate court found there was substantial evidence that the INS had not sufficiently corrected practices and behaviors that infringed on Salvadoran's rights following the preliminary injunction, Orantes-Hernandez v. Smith, meaning the permanent injunction had been warranted. In particular, the court found that INS agents had continued to coerce detainees and interfere with their right to counsel

== Orantes-Hernandez v. Gonzalez (2007) ==
In 2002, the Department of Homeland Security was formed, restructuring many government agencies, including the dissolution of the INS. The Department of Homeland Security would oversee the immigration system as a whole. As a result of this restructuring, the Department of Health and Human Services, would now be responsible for unaccompanied minors in the immigration system. The DHS sought clarification on the previous injunction from Orantes-Hernandez v. Thornburgh, and how it applied to their responsibilities and procedures. With the change in structure, the government went on to file a motion to dissolve the injunction altogether, citing changes in the law that made it unnecessary. The U.S. district court of California denied the motion because they found that the government had failed to make necessary changes to comply fully with the injunction. The court cited continued interference with immigrant's rights to counsel, telephones, and information about seeking political asylum.

== Orantes-Hernandez v. Holder (2010) ==
In 2009, the plaintiffs from the original class-action lawsuit, Orantes-Hernandez v. Smith, filed a motion to receive attorney's fees for the previous legal proceedings. The plaintiffs argued that the previous case, Orantes-Hernandez v. Gonzalez, and defending the injunction from dissolution changed the nature of the legal relationship between the government and the plaintiffs, and therefore entitling them to attorney's fees under the Equal Access to Justice Act. The EAJA has several requirements plaintiffs must meet in order to be eligible for compensation. These include the plaintiffs being the "prevailing party", there being no special circumstances under which the fees would be considered unjust, and the government's position in the legal proceedings being considered not "substantially justified". The government opposed this motion claiming that the previous decisions from Orantes-Hernandez v. Gonzalez did not alter the legal relationship, and that defending a previously existing injunction from dissolution does not warrant an Equal Access to Justice Act grant of attorney's fees, as it does not impose new obligations on the government. The government cited several previous court cases, such as Alliance to End Repression v. City of Chicago in an effort to show that defensive litigation of an injunction does not qualify for financial compensation, according to the Equal Access to Justice Act. The Ninth Circuit Court of Appeals rejected the government's argument, stating that the nature of the legal relationship had changed with the plaintiffs' successful defense of the Orantes-Hernandez injunction. They also stated that the protection of the permanent injunction forced the government to comply with ongoing protections for Salvadoran immigrants, which they had not been following for several years. This resulted in an obligation to change behavior for the government, which the Ninth Circuit Court of Appeals found substantial grounds for the plaintiffs to qualify for attorney's fees. The government was eventually order to pay the plaintiffs $1,343,888.02 in total, and given 2 months to comply.
