= Stopping Tax Offenders and Prosecuting Identity Theft Act of 2013 =

- Long title: To provide effective criminal prosecutions for certain identity thefts, and for other purposes.
- Announced in: the 113th United States Congress
- Sponsored by: Rep. Debbie Wasserman Schultz (D, FL-23)
- Number of co-sponsors: 1

Codification
- Acts affected: Internal Revenue Code of 1986
- U.S.C. sections affected: 18 U.S.C. § 1028, 31 U.S.C. § 1116, 18 U.S.C. ch. 47, 18 U.S.C. § 1028A
- Agencies affected: United States Department of Justice

Legislative history
- Introduced in the House as H.R. 744 by Rep. Debbie Wasserman Schultz (D, FL-23) on February 15, 2013; Committee consideration by United States House Committee on the Judiciary, United States House Judiciary Subcommittee on Crime, Terrorism, Homeland Security and Investigations

The Stopping Tax Offenders and Prosecuting Identity Theft Act of 2013 or the STOP Identity Theft Act of 2013 (H.R. 744) is a bill that would increase the penalties on identity thieves in the United States and change the definition of identity theft to include businesses and organizations instead of just individuals.

The bill was introduced into the United States House of Representatives during the 113th United States Congress.

== Background ==
As of 2013, Florida was the U.S. state that "leads the nation when it comes to federal tax return identity theft." In 2011, the Internal Revenue Service "found 938,664 tax returns involving identity theft and $6.5 billion in fraudulent refunds."

In 2012, the House voted in a voice vote to pass a previous version of this bill, the Stopping Tax Offenders and Prosecuting Identity Theft Act of 2012 (H.R. 4362), but the United States Senate never voted on the bill.

== Provisions of the bill ==
This summary is based largely on the summary provided by the Congressional Research Service, a public domain source.

The Stopping Tax Offenders and Prosecuting Identity Theft Act of 2013 or the STOP Identity Theft Act of 2013 would call for the United States Attorney General to: (1) make use of all existing resources of the United States Department of Justice (DOJ), including task forces, to bring more perpetrators of tax return identity theft to justice; and (2) take into account the need to concentrate efforts in areas of the country where the crime is most frequently reported, to coordinate with state and local authorities to prosecute and prevent such crime, and to protect vulnerable groups from becoming victims or otherwise being used in the offense.

The bill would amend the federal criminal code to: (1) include organizations as victims for purposes of prohibitions against identity theft or aggravated identity theft, and (2) subject an identity theft offense committed during and in relation to tax fraud to a fine and/or up to 20 years' imprisonment.

The bill would direct the Attorney General to include in the first annual DOJ performance report made more than nine months after the date of this Act's enactment information as to progress in implementing this Act regarding: (1) information readily available to DOJ about trends in the incidence of tax return identity theft, (2) the effectiveness of statutory tools in aiding DOJ in prosecuting it, (3) recommendations on additional statutory tools that would aid in removing barriers to effective prosecution, and (4) the status of implementing DOJ's March 2010 audit report on DOJ efforts to combat identity theft.

== Congressional Budget Office report ==
This summary is based largely on the summary provided by the Congressional Budget Office, as ordered reported by the House Committee on the Judiciary on July 16, 2014. This is a public domain source.

H.R. 744 would direct the United States Department of Justice (DOJ) to better utilize its existing resources to combat identity theft related to the filing of tax returns. The department currently allocates its funding to investigate and prosecute a wide range of criminal activity, including identity theft. The Congressional Budget Office (CBO) expects that the legislation could result in a reallocation of DOJ resources, but we estimate that implementing the bill would have no significant net cost to the federal government. Enacting H.R. 744 would not affect direct spending or revenues; therefore, pay-as-you-go procedures do not apply.

H.R. 744 contains no intergovernmental or private-sector mandates as defined in the Unfunded Mandates Reform Act and would not affect the budgets of state, local, or tribal governments.

== Procedural history ==
| Congress | Short title | Bill number(s) | Date introduced | Sponsor(s) | # of cosponsors | Latest status |
|---|---|---|---|---|---|---|
| 112th Congress | STOP Identity Theft Act of 2012 | H.R. 4362 | April 16, 2012 | Debbie Wasserman Schultz (D-FL) | 13 | Passed House |
| 112th Congress | STOP Identity Theft Act of 2012 | S. 3688 | December 17, 2012 | Amy Klobuchar (D-MN) | 1 | Died in committee |
| 113th Congress | STOP Identity Theft Act of 2014 | H.R. 744 | February 15, 2013 | Debbie Wasserman Schultz (D-FL) | 8 | Passed House |
| 113th Congress | STOP Identity Theft Act of 2013 | S. 149 | January 24, 2013 | Amy Klobuchar (D-MN) | 3 | Died in committee |
| 114th Congress | STOP Identity Theft Act of 2015 | H.R. 1110 | February 26, 2015 | Debbie Wasserman Schultz (D-FL) | 1 | Died in committee |

The Stopping Tax Offenders and Prosecuting Identity Theft Act of 2013 was introduced into the United States House of Representatives on February 15, 2013, by Rep. Debbie Wasserman Schultz (D, FL-23). It was referred to the United States House Committee on the Judiciary and the United States House Judiciary Subcommittee on Crime, Terrorism, Homeland Security and Investigations. The bill was scheduled to be voted on in the House under a suspension of the rules on September 8, 2014.

== Debate and discussion ==
The National Association of Counties (NACO) supported the bill, placing it on their agenda to "urge Congress to pass legislation supporting action to reduce tax crimes and identity theft."

== See also ==
- List of bills in the 113th United States Congress
- Identity theft in the United States
