= North Carolina Identity Theft Protection Act of 2005 =

Series of laws to reduce identity theft

The North Carolina Identity Theft Protection Act of 2005 is a series of broad laws that was passed by the General Assembly of the U.S. state of North Carolina to prevent or discourage identity theft as well as guarding and protecting individual privacy.

== Summary ==
North Carolina Attorney General Roy Cooper proposed the Identity Theft Protection Act of 2005 which was introduced by Senator Dan Clodfelter. The act was designed to strengthen safeguards for personal information, requiring businesses and government to better protect sensitive financial information, and gave consumers more tools to fight theft of their information. This includes more restriction on the collection, use, and safekeeping of a consumer's social security number and consumer financial information. The Act requires businesses, charities and government to notify individuals if a security breach has compromised any personal information and placed them at risk of identity theft. North Carolina consumers were given the right to obtain a Security Freeze on their credit reports. Placing a security freeze on a credit report would prohibit credit reporting agencies from releasing any information about you to new creditors, making it difficult for an identity thief to open an account or obtain credit in your name. Further the Act gave the right to sue for civil damages in the event of identity fraud / theft. The Act covers everything from rights to penalties. SESSION LAW 2005-414 and SENATE BILL 1048. The Act applies to any entity (financial institutions, charities, government, businesses, etc.). Companies located in and out of North Carolina that conduct business in state or keep personal information of state residents are required to comply. Compliance falls under the Attorney General's jurisdiction. Detailed information is available from the North Carolina Attorney General's office. The requirements cannot be waived by individuals. "Skimming", a process of defrauding consumers by scanning credit card or debit card encoded data, became prohibited under this Act's 2003 predecessor.

== Ratified ==
- Approved 10:50 a.m. on the 21st day of September 2005.
- The General Assembly ratified the act on 23-August-2005. Portions of the act were effective 01-December-2005, with other sections being effective in October 2006 and July 2007.
- The act was signed by Beverly E. Perdue (President of the Senate), James B. Black (Speaker of the House of Representatives) and Michael F. Easley (Governor).

== Other states that have passed similar laws ==
Laws of this nature are being passed by legislatures all over the United States. Colorado, Connecticut, Delaware, Florida, Georgia, Louisiana, Maine, Minnesota, Montana, Nevada, New Mexico, North Dakota, Ohio, Pennsylvania, Rhode Island, Tennessee, Texas, Virginia and Washington have passed laws relating to identity theft.
