= C27 =

C27 or C-27 may refer to:

== Vehicles ==
- Aeritalia C-27A Spartan, an Italian military transport aircraft
- Alenia C-27J Spartan, an Italian military transport aircraft
- Bellanca C-27 Airbus, a military transport aircraft used by the United States Army Air Corps
- Caspar C 27, a German seaplane trainer
- Caudron C.27, a French biplane
- HMS C27, a C-class submarine of the Royal Navy

== Other uses ==
- C27 road (Namibia)
- Bill C-27 (39th Canadian Parliament, 2nd Session)
- Caldwell 27, an emission nebula
- Caterpillar C27, a diesel engine
