= Identity Theft Resource Center =

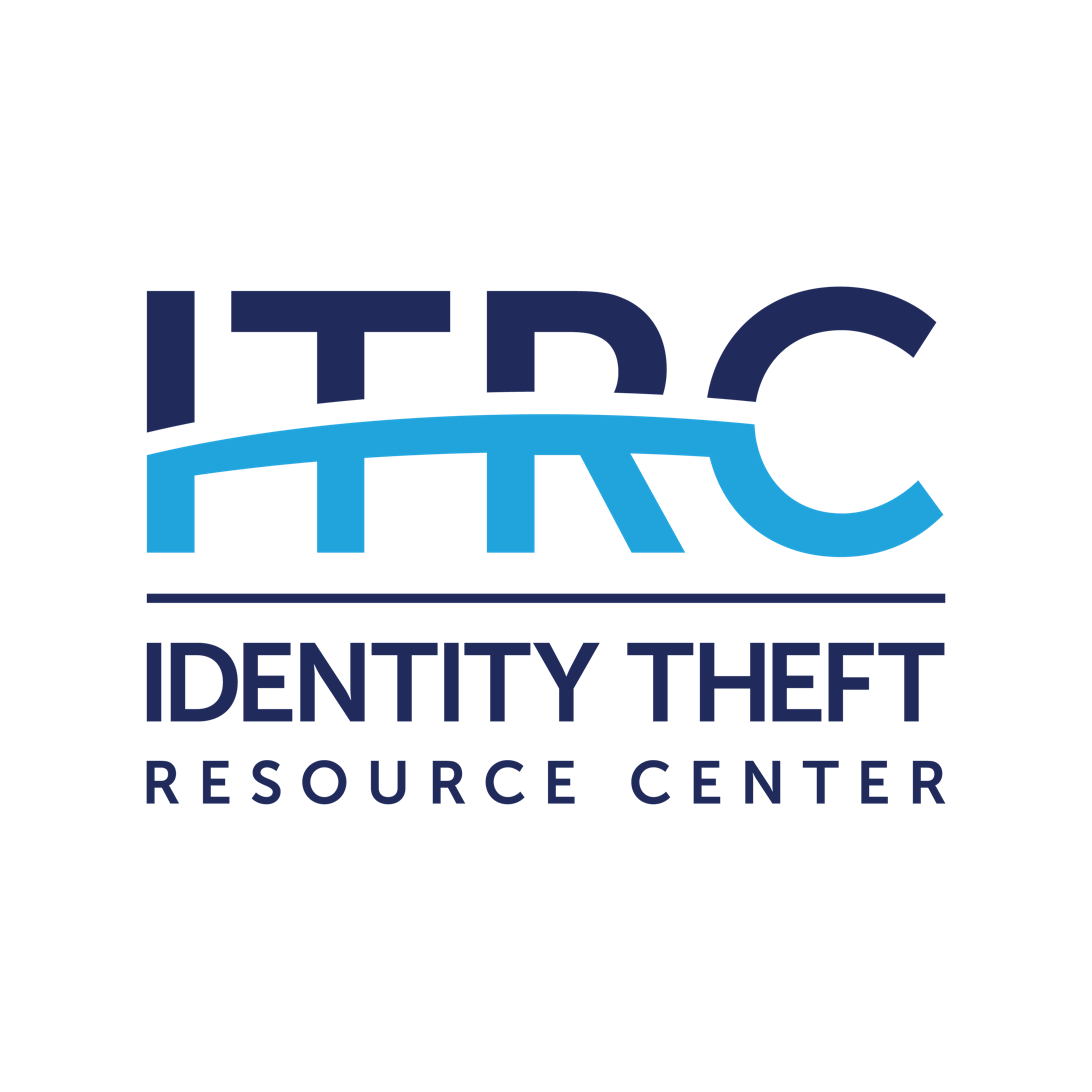
Identity Theft Resource Center Logo

The Identity Theft Resource Center (ITRC) is a United States non-profit organization that provides identity crime victim assistance and education, free of charge, through a toll-free call center, live chat, website, podcasts, and social media. The ITRC educates consumers, businesses, government agencies, policymakers, and other organizations on best practices for identity theft and fraud detection, reduction, and mitigation; and, serves as an objective national resource on trends related to cybersecurity, data breaches, social media, fraud, scams, and other identity issues.

The ITRC was founded in December 1999 in San Diego, California and is a 501(c)(3) non-profit funded by a combination of competitive government grants, business services and sponsorships, and corporate donations.[1] In addition to the victim assistance services that are free of charge to individual consumers, the Center also conducts research and analysis related to identity and data privacy issues and publishes four annual reports that detail trends and impacts of identity crimes: the ITRC Data Breach Report, the ITRC Trends in Identity Crimes Report, the ITRC Consumer Impact Report, and the ITRC Small Business Impact Report. [2]

The ITRC received a United States Department of Justice National Crime Victim Service Award in 2004.[3] In 2019, ITRC President & CEO Eva Velasquez received a Crime Victims Service Award from the U.S. Department of Justice

== See also ==
- Bank fraud
- Check fraud
- Check washing
- Credit card fraud
- Fair and Accurate Credit Transactions Act
- Fair Credit Billing Act
- Fair Credit Reporting Act
- Ghosting (identity theft)
- Hacking
- Identity document forgery
- Identity fraud
- Identity theft
- Internet security
- Pharming
- Phishing
- RFID
- Spam
- Wireless identity theft
