= HR 5405 =

United States bill submitted in 2008

H.R. 5405, or the "Social Security Identity Theft Prevention Act" is a bill submitted to the U.S. House of Representatives on February 13, 2008, whose claimed purpose is: "To protect seniors from identity theft and strengthen our national security by providing for the issuance of a secure Social Security card. The bill states that certain "biometric identifiers" such as facial features, will be collected and stored in a government database to "protect seniors from identity theft" by enabling the government to scan people's faces to verify their identity.

The bill describes the new social security card as follows:

(ii) A social security card issued pursuant to clause (i) of this subparagraph to an individual described in subparagraph (B)(ii) shall--

(I) be made of tamperproof and wear-resistant material;

(II) have clearly marked on its face the name and social security account number of the individual to whom the card is issued;

(III) in the case of a card issued to an individual after attaining age 16, display a digital image, captured directly by an officer or employee of the Social Security Administration acting in his or her official capacity, of the person to whom the social security account number was issued and the date on which that image was captured; and

(IV) contain an encrypted, machine-readable electronic record which shall include records of biometric identifiers unique to the individual to whom the card is issued, including a copy of any digitized facial image printed on the face of the card pursuant to subclause (III).

— H.R. 5405

== See also ==
- REAL ID
- Biometrics
