= Open Book on Equal Access to Justice Act =

- Long title: To amend titles 5 and 28, United States Code, to require annual reports to Congress on, and the maintenance of databases on, awards of fees and other expenses to prevailing parties in certain administrative proceedings and court cases to which the United States is a party, and for other purposes.
- Announced in: the 113th United States Congress
- Sponsored by: Rep. Cynthia M. Lummis (R, WY-0)
- Number of co-sponsors: 3

Codification
- U.S.C. sections affected: 5 U.S.C. § 504, 28 U.S.C. § 2412, 31 U.S.C. § 1304
- Agencies affected: Administrative Office of the United States Courts, United States Department of Justice, United States Congress, Administrative Conference of the United States

Legislative history
- Introduced in the House as H.R. 2919 by Rep. Cynthia M. Lummis (R, WY-0) on August 1, 2013; Committee consideration by United States House Committee on the Judiciary, United States House Judiciary Subcommittee on the Constitution and Civil Justice

The Open Book on Equal Access to Justice Act (H.R. 2919) is a bill that would require the Administrative Conference of the United States (ACUS) to prepare a report each year on the amount of fees and other expenses awarded by federal courts to nonfederal entities when they prevail in a case against the United States. The bill would amend the Equal Access to Justice Act.

The bill was introduced into the United States House of Representatives during the 113th United States Congress.

== Background ==
The Equal Access to Justice Act, when it was passed in 1980, originally required agencies and the Justice Department to "issue annual reports on the amount of money paid out under the law," but that reporting requirement was later ended in 1995. This bill would reinstate that requirement.

According to the office of Congresswoman Lummis, "Congress passed the Equal Access to Justice Act (EAJA) as a means to help individuals, retirees, veterans, and small businesses recover attorney’s fees and costs associated with suing the federal government. Congress intended EAJA to remove a barrier to justice for those with limited access to the resources it takes to sue or defend against the federal government."

== Provisions of the bill ==
This summary is based largely on the summary provided by the Congressional Research Service, a public domain source.

The Open Book on Equal Access to Justice Act would amend the Equal Access to Justice Act and the federal judicial code to require the Chairman of the Administrative Conference of the United States to report to Congress annually on the amount of fees and other expenses awarded to prevailing parties other than the United States in certain administrative proceedings and civil action court cases (excluding tort cases) to which the United States is a party, including settlement agreements.

The bill would require that such reports: (1) describe the number, nature, and amount of the awards, the claims involved in the controversy, and any other relevant information that may aid Congress in evaluating the scope and impact of such awards; and (2) be made available to the public online.

The bill would also direct the Chairman to create and maintain online a searchable database containing specified information with respect to each award including the name of the agency involved, the name of each party to whom the award was made, the amount of the award, and the basis for finding that the position of the agency concerned was not substantially justified.

The bill would direct the head of each agency (including, with respect to court cases, the Attorney General (DOJ) and the Director of the Administrative Office of the United States Courts) to provide the Chairman all information requested to produce such reports.

== Congressional Budget Office report ==
This summary is based largely on the summary provided by the Congressional Budget Office, as ordered reported by the House Committee on the Judiciary on February 5, 2014. This is a public domain source.

H.R. 2919 would require the Administrative Conference of the United States (ACUS) to prepare a report each year on the amount of fees and other expenses awarded by federal courts to nonfederal entities when they prevail in a case against the United States. The bill also would require the ACUS to create an online searchable database containing information about cases in which fees and expenses were awarded by courts or federal agencies. The ACUS is an independent agency that assists other agencies of the federal government in improving regulatory and other administrative procedures.

Based on information from the ACUS, the Congressional Budget Office (CBO) estimates that implementing H.R. 2919 would cost about $1 million in fiscal year 2015 and less than $500,000 each year thereafter, assuming appropriation of the necessary amounts. These funds would cover costs for additional ACUS staff, technological upgrades, and data collection by federal agencies. Enacting the bill would not affect direct spending or revenues; therefore, pay-as-you-go procedures do not apply.

H.R. 2919 contains no intergovernmental or private-sector mandates as defined in the Unfunded Mandates Reform Act and would not affect the budgets of state, local, or tribal governments.

== Procedural history ==
The Open Book on Equal Access to Justice Act was introduced into the United States House of Representatives on August 1, 2013 by Rep. Cynthia M. Lummis (R, WY-0). The bill was referred to the United States House Committee on the Judiciary and the United States House Judiciary Subcommittee on the Constitution and Civil Justice. The bill was scheduled to be voted on under suspension of the rules on May 6, 2014.

== Debate and discussion ==
Rep. Lummis, who introduced the bill, said that "requiring agencies to keep track of what they pay attorneys will help Congress determine if EAJA is working well or not." According to Lummis, the EAJA was meant to the help the "little guy" but "was later co-opted by large environmental groups so their litigation shops could get reimbursed for filing expansive litigation on environmental issues."

Rep. Steve Cohen (D-TN), an original co-sponsor of the bill, argued that "Americans have a right to know what their government is doing and their government has a duty to be as transparent as possible."

The National Association of Counties (NACO) strongly supported the bill because it "strives to create a balance between ensuring access to courts for individuals, small businesses, and non-profit organizations in suits against the federal government and preventing abuses of the system." According to NACO, the "legislation provides necessary transparency in an effort to stop EAJA abuses," but allows "veterans, social security claimants, individuals, and small businesses" to "still enjoy full access to EAJA funds."

== See also ==
- List of bills in the 113th United States Congress
