= Civil Identity Program of the Americas =

Organization of American States that are devoted to civil identity

Created in 2007, the Universal Civil Identity Program in the Americas (PUICA) is the area of the Organization of American States (OAS) that is devoted to civil identity. It belongs to the Department for Effective Public Management within the Secretariat for Political Affairs.

PUICA supports the member states of the OAS in their efforts to eradicate under-registration, in order to ensure recognition of the right to civil identity for all persons in the region.

== Objectives ==
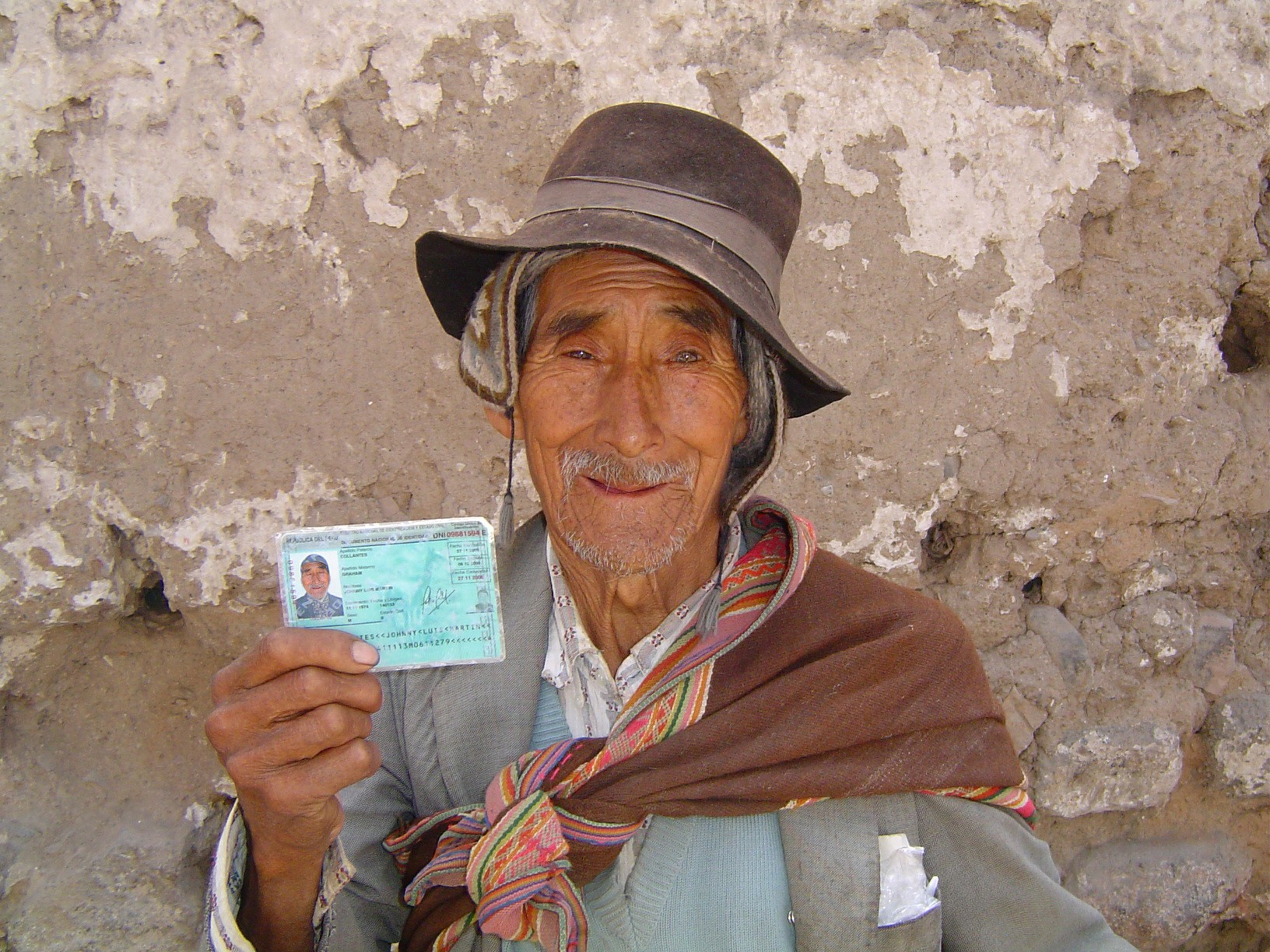
Peruvian citizen showing his identity card

All PUICA activities are geared towards fulfilling the five objectives set by the Inter-American Program for Universal Civil Registry and the Right to Identity:

- Universalization and accessibility of civil registry and the right to identity
- Strengthening of policies, public institutions, and national legislation
- Public participation and awareness
- Identification of best practices
- Promoting international and regional cooperation

=== Universalizing and improving access to civil registry ===
Currently, some 10% of children born in Latin America and Caribbean officially do not exist as their births were never recorded. This means that the states have no proof of their existence and that those children will therefore have no protection from a variety of violations and will also be excluded from basic services. In terms of the adult population, there are no accurate data on the number of people who were never registered, and the percentages vary significantly from country to country and from region to region within countries. What is certain is that poverty is a constant factor where there is under-registration, and that the latter mainly affects the most vulnerable populations.

To address this situation, the priorities of PUICA include reducing the rate of under-registration and removing barriers to effective registration, with an emphasis on areas with populations in situations of poverty and vulnerability.

The work of PUICA in this regard revolves around the following strategies:

- Carrying out mobile registration campaigns, taking registration to inaccessible places.
- Implementing birth registration systems in hospitals.
- Recovery of destroyed records.

=== Strengthening policies, public institutions, and national laws relating to civil registration ===
Through institutional strengthening, generation of synergies in national registration institutions, and improvement of legislative techniques, PUICA seeks to ensure that the outcomes obtained by the intervention will be sustained over time and thus make progress permanent.

The strategies that the program has developed to achieve this sustainability are:

- Training activities of officials, registration authorities and community leaders.
- Implementation of technologies and systems in civil registry operations.
- Systematization of interventions for further replication.
- Development of legal frameworks for the processes of modernization.
- Strengthening the security of records and systems of communication between their units.
- Integration of civil registration with other state agencies and social programs.

=== Increasing public participation and awareness ===
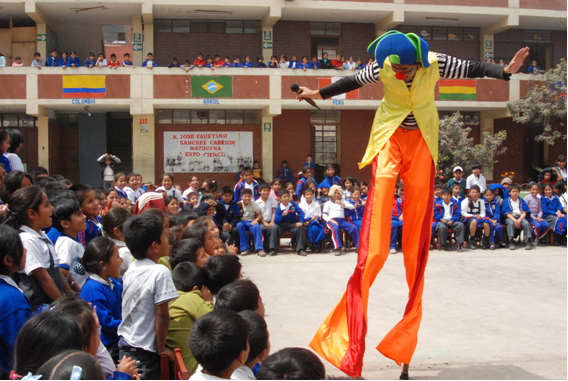
Theatric work at a school to explain to children the importance of being registered

The participation of the communities served in project design and execution is a defining feature of the PUICA strategy. This participation is both at the stage prior to design and subsequent campaign coordination and promotion.

Awareness among the population and among the institutions about the importance of the right to identity is also vital to the elimination of under-registration. Hence PUICA wants awareness to be a very important component of its strategy, and incorporates it into campaigns through awareness workshops in schools and health centers.

=== Identification and promotion of best practices ===
In their effort to spur access to civil records, national registration institutions have been continually come up with practices that are delivering positive results. In this regard, the work undertaken by PUICA is to identify those practices and provide a forum for them to be disseminated and shared. Collaboration is also being pursued with the CLARCIEV (Latin American Council for Civil Registration, Identification, and Vital Statistics), the body that brings together civil registration institutions in the region, thus enabling knowledge transfer among the region's registration institutions. Since 2009, PUICA has served as Executive Secretariat of CLARCIEV, and manages that institution's website.

In 2010, PUICA published its “Handbook of Civil Registration Best Practices,” which contains a methodology for identifying those best practices and a description of best practices identified in Mexico, Peru, and Colombia.

=== Promoting international and regional cooperation ===
A key element of the PUICA strategy is the promotion of partnership – between and among different countries of the Region, and between and among local and international cooperation players, the aim being to:

- Map institutions representative of the areas, prior to the execution of a project, for the purpose of including them in design and implementation;
- Reach agreements with other international cooperation agencies, such as the agreement reached with UNICEF and the Inter-American Development Bank;
- Promote inter-agency partnerships in projects to strengthen civil records, supporting civil society participation.

== Countries ==
PUICA has worked in various countries of Latin America and the Caribbean:

=== Bolivia ===
Mobile registration and publicity campaigns

Through mobile registration and publicity campaigns in the Yungas, Manco Kapac, Beni and Chuquisaca regions, and in collaboration with the National Civil Registry Bureau of Bolivia, the right to identity is now a reality for more than 15,000 individuals, most of them indigenous.

It is expected that by 2011 about 6,000 people in the rural areas of Potosí will have benefited from this mobile registration system.

Both operations have been funded through the Spanish International Development Cooperation Agency (AECID).

=== El Salvador ===
Strengthening the Hospital Records System

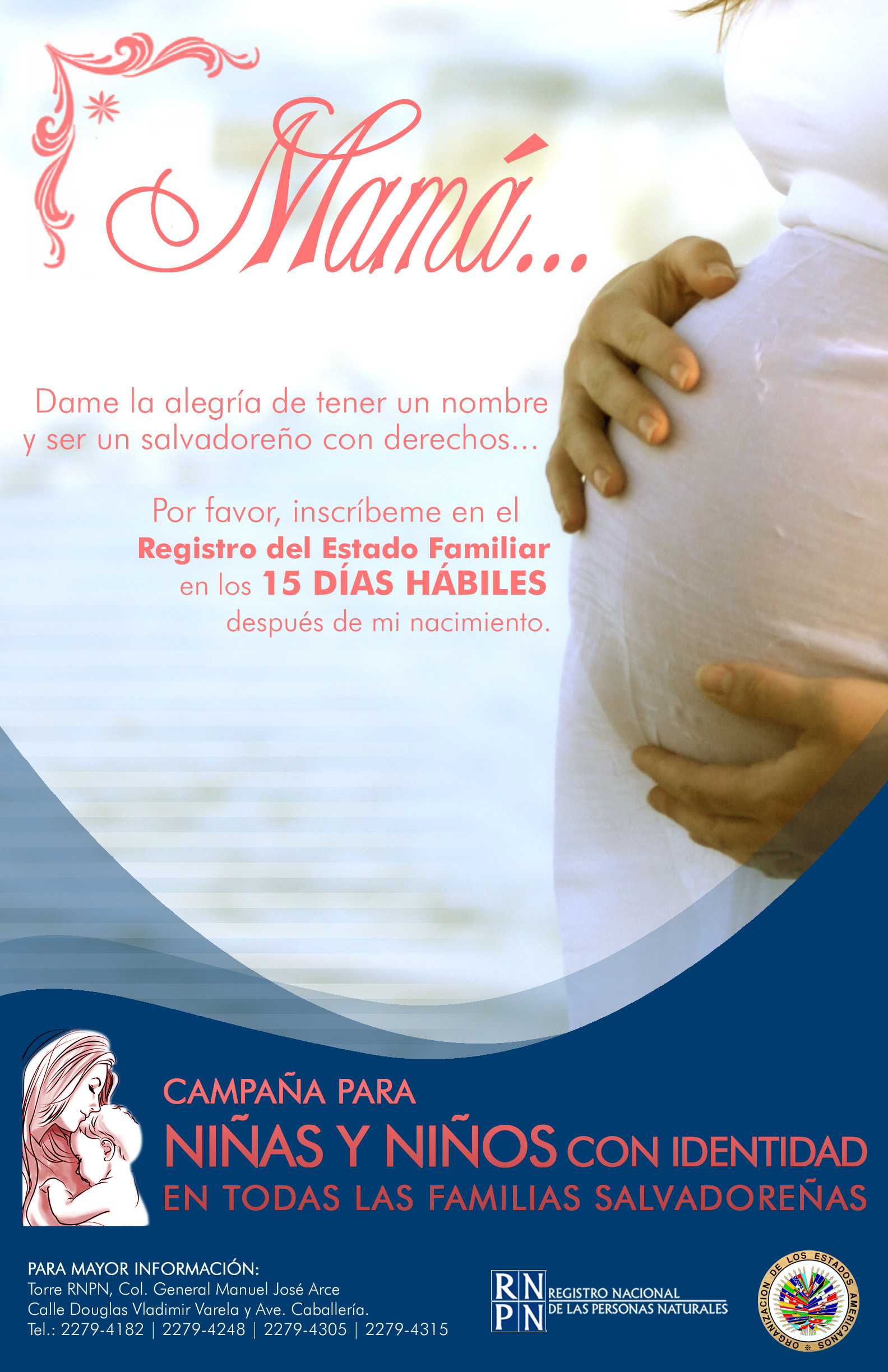
Poster in the Hospital of Sonsonate promoting the registration of babies at birth

To support the National Registry of Natural Persons, a hospital records system has been put in place at the Sonsonate National Hospital, facilitating birth registration for more than 10,000 newborns since of the beginning of the system, in 2009. This hospital records system has been extended to Ahuachapán Hospital, and will be expanded to other hospitals in the future.

The operation in El Salvador was financed with funds from the Spanish cooperation agency (AECID).

=== Guatemala ===
Mobile registration and publicity campaigns. Institutional strengthening. Process audits

Several registration and publicity campaigns have been staged in different parts of the country – including Chichicastenango, San Pedro Sacatepequez, San Juan Sacatepequez, San Raimundo, and Huehuetenango – in collaboration with the National Registry of Persons. Through training for community leaders and with their collaboration, more than 2,000 people, mostly indigenous, were registered for the first time.

At the request of the Government of Guatemala, PUICA also audited the National Registry of Persons processes in 2010 and is supporting that institution as it implements the recommendations.

As with the Bolivia and El Salvador operations, the projects executed in Guatemala were funded by the Spanish Cooperation Agency.

=== Haiti ===
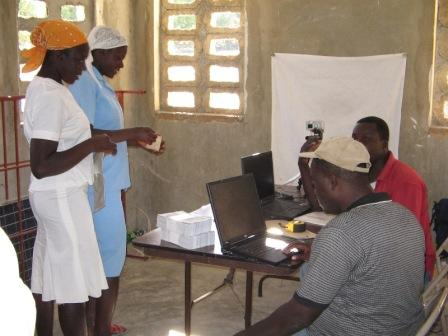
Registration campaign in Haiti

Civil registry modernization and integration

More than 4.8 million Haitians now have an identity, thanks to mobile registration campaigns. Personnel from the National Identification Office have also been trained, thus providing the institution with the necessary technology and infrastructure. Also, 141 Registration Offices were opened. As well, in support of the National Archives, more than eight million historical records have been digitized and entered into an electronic database.

These projects are being implemented with financial support from the Canadian cooperation agency (CIDA).

=== Mexico ===
Promotion of Civil Identity. Sharing Best Practices. Awareness

In Mexico, the strategy is based on cooperation with the National Registry of Population and Personal Identification to promote civil identity nationwide. To that end, an international symposium on measuring under-registration of births was held, and a workshop on best practices in civil registration technologies was conducted, along with a number of publicity campaigns to promote the importance of civil identity.

Canadian cooperation funds have helped these projects to be financially viable.

=== Paraguay ===
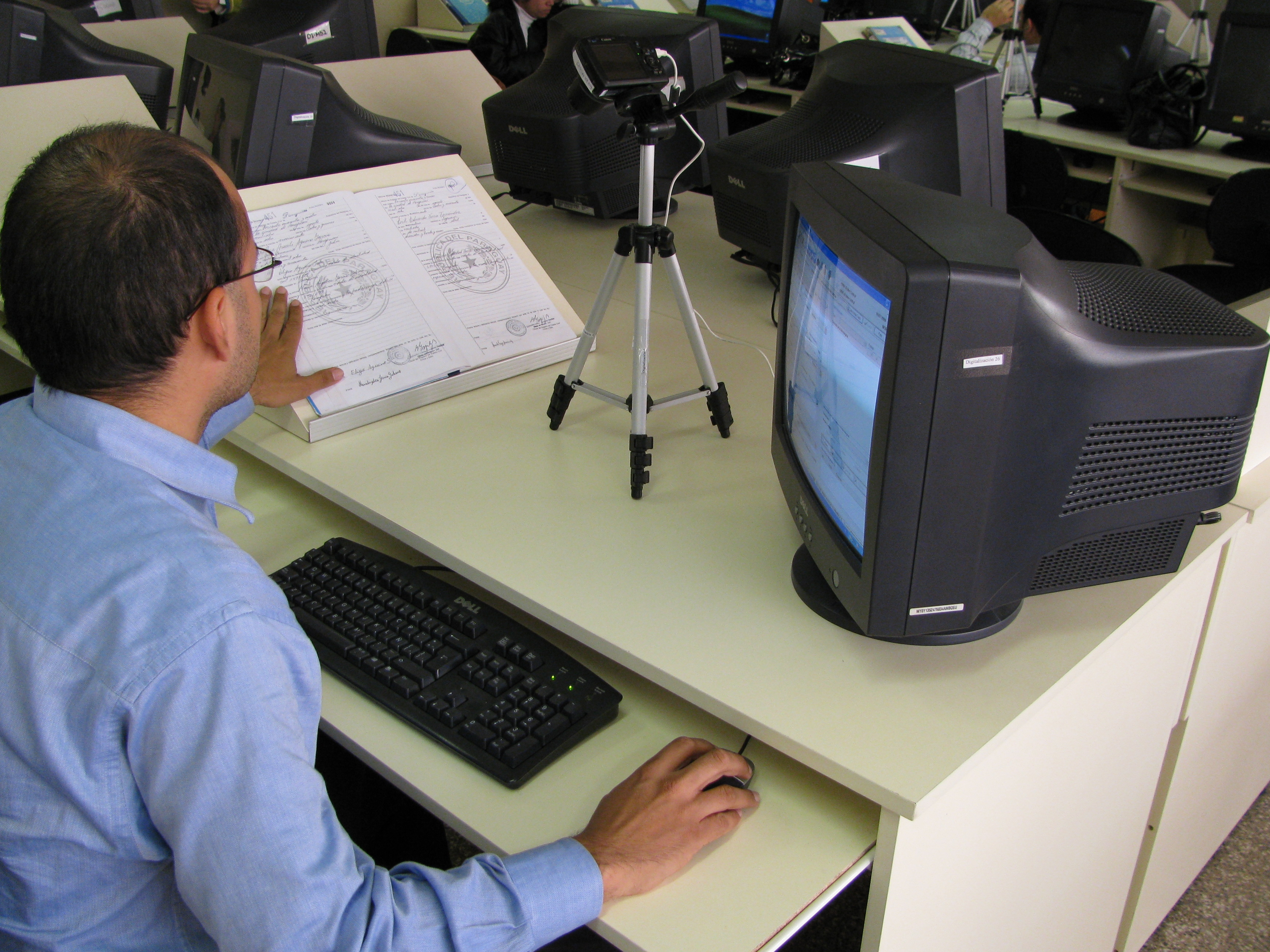
Digitization of birth certificates to be incorporated in a digital database. Paraguay

Modernization of the Civil Registry. Digitalization of Historical Records. Registration Campaigns

Using technical equipment acquired, along with staff training, the registry's staff itself has been digitizing millions of records, and this will facilitate linking the registry with other public institutions such as hospitals and will make the project sustainable. The Civil Registry will be provided with support to carry out mobile registration and publicity campaigns in indigenous communities.

The project in Paraguay has been funded by the Canadian International Development Agency.

=== Peru ===
Mobile registration and publicity campaigns. Rebuilding destroyed records

Through the system of mobile registration and publicity campaigns, more than 15,000 people have been registered in Peru. The campaigns were done in Huaycán, San Juan de Lurigancho, and Huancavelica. The records destroyed by the armed conflict with the Shining Path in this latter town were also reconstructed.

These projects were funded with help from Spain, United States, and Italy.

=== The Caribbean: Antigua and Barbuda, Dominica, Grenada, St. Kitts and Nevis, Saint Lucia, and St. Vincent and the Grenadines ===
Civil registry modernization. Computerization of records

The objective in this subregion is to consolidate civil registry electronic databases by digitizing historical records.

The Canadian cooperation agency is funding the execution of this project, along with fonds from United States and Chile.

== See also ==
- Civil Registry
- Organization of American States
