= Bill C-27: An Act to amend the Criminal Code (identity theft and related misconduct) =

Proposed Canadian federal legislation

Legislative history
- Bill citation: Bill C-27
- First reading: November 21, 2007
- Status: Not passed

Bill C-27: An Act to amend the Criminal Code (identity theft and related misconduct) (French: Projet de loi C-27: Loi modifiant le Code criminel (vol d'identité et inconduites connexes)) was proposed legislation that would have changed Canadian laws to help prevent identity theft. The bill was introduced in the Canadien House of Commons on November 21, 2007, but never passed, as it died on the Order Paper when Stephen Harper's government prorogued Parliament in December 2008.

== Proposed legislation ==
=== Official document ===
An official document was defined as follows in the Bill: "For the purposes of this section, "identity document" means a social insurance number card, a driver's licence, a health insurance card, a birth certificate, a passport as defined in subsection 57(5), a document that simplifies the process of entry into Canada, a certificate of citizenship, a document indicating immigration status in Canada or a certificate of Indian status, issued or purported to be issued by a department or agency of the federal or a provincial government, or any similar document issued or purported to be issued by a foreign government." The bill did not include debit cards and credit cards. For someone to possess someone else's official document, they would have had to have the document owner's permission or provide a valid reason. Valid include genealogical research and administration of justice.

=== Credit cards and debit cards ===
Possessing, using, and trafficking are at the same level, without colour of right. It is not legal to possess someone else's credit card. It is not legal to possess any material that can copy or falsify credit cards. This bill would have made illegal all devices used to copy credit card data, something that was not clearly defined in previous bills.

=== Mail ===
Mail provides another avenue for identity theft. Businesses and governments send mail containing cheques, credit cards, bank statements, and other important information. Even personal letters can contain information potentially useful to identity thieves. To protect the public, bill C-27 would have clarified the definition of identity theft. Absconding with correctly delivered mail "after it is delivered but before it is in the possession of the addressee or of a person who may reasonably be considered to be authorized by the addressee to receive mail" is considered stealing. Before, the definition ended where the mail is delivered. It was unclear whether deliver meant the post office put the mail in the mailbox or the intended recipient had it in their hands. This revision would have removed the ambiguity.

=== Forging documents ===
The bill stated that people should not accept or use any document as genuine when it seems forged. A person should not make available any document they suspect are forgeries. Regardless of intent, it is a crime to make it available. Basically, one cannot claim, "People are free to do what they want with a forged document."

The bill stated that using, buying, exporting, importing, repairing any device that is used to build forged documents is unlawful. One needs authorization or a lawful excuse.

== New content ==
=== Identity theft and identity fraud ===
Identity information is any and all data that could be used to identify a person. Such information can be in the form of name, date of birth, signature, credit card number, debit card number, SIN, or other information. The bill also would have included other identifiers such as biological identifiers, DNA, fingerprint, retinal image, iris image, and voiceprint. Early in 2008, the Province of British Columbia began testing the use of such biometrics in a new enhanced drivers license.

Bill C-27 defined identity theft as the following: "Everyone commits an offence who transmits, makes available, distributes, sells or offers for sale another person's identity information, or has it in their possession for any of those purposes, knowing or believing that or being reckless as to whether the information will be used to commit an indictable offence that includes fraud, deceit or falsehood as an element of the offence."

The bill stated that a trial would occur in the province in which the allegation has happened, or, if the accused is not in that province, the trial cannot happen without the approval of the Attorney General of that province.

Identity fraud had a different definition: "03. (1) Every one commits an offence who fraudulently personates any person, living or dead,

(a) with intent to gain an advantage for themself or another person;
(b) with intent to obtain any property or an interest in any property;
(c) with intent to cause disadvantage to the person being personated or another person; or
(d) with intent to avoid arrest or prosecution, or to obstruct, pervert or defeat the course of justice."

This included impersonating someone by using identity information, including impersonating someone on social networking web sites.
