= Servicemember's Access to Justice Act =

The Servicemembers Access to Justice Act of 2008 (SAJA) (S. 3432) was introduced on August 1, 2008, by Senators Barack Obama, Edward Kennedy and Robert Casey. The bill was an attempt to ensure that returning reservists keep their jobs and employment benefits as required under current law. The bill was referred to committee and failed to become law in the 110th Congress.

Specifically, SAJA would have made it easier for servicemembers to obtain justice when their employment rights are violated by prohibiting employers from requiring servicemembers to give up their ability to enforce their rights under the Uniformed Services Employment and Reemployment Rights Act (USERRA) in court in order to get or keep a job. It also would have added minimum liquidated damages for willful violations and punitive damages for violations committed with malice.

SAJA was an attempt by its supporters to restore what they believe was the original intent of Congress to protect servicemembers under USERRA by making it clear that USERRA prohibits employers from paying lower wages to servicemembers simply because of their status as a servicemember, veteran, or applicant to be a servicemember.
