= Equal Access to Justice Act =

In the United States of America, the Equal Access to Justice Act (EAJA), first passed in 1980, authorizes the payment of attorney's fees to a prevailing party in an action against the United States absent a showing by the government that its position in the underlying litigation "was substantially justified". The Act is codified in scattered sections of the United States Code:

- 5 U. S. C. § 504 provides that an agency that conducts an adversary adjudication against a prevailing party (as "party" is defined) shall pay the fees and expenses of the party, unless the adjudicative officer of the agency finds that the position of the agency was substantially justified. "Adversary adjudication" is defined as a formal trial-type ex parte proceeding in which the agency is adverse to the party, and governed by 5 U. S. C. § 554 "trial type" proceedings, as opposed to an inter partes proceeding in which the agency adjudicates a dispute between two parties, or the less-formal proceedings of § 555.
- 28 U. S. C. §2412 provides that the agency shall pay attorney fees of a prevailing party in a court case against the agency, unless the court finds that the agency position was substantially justified.

Each is subject to multiple conditions. Section 2412(d)(1) for court fees requires:

- a short time deadline after the favorable final judgment (see Time for Filing), including a statement of "the amount sought, including an itemized statement from any attorney ... stating the actual time expended and the rate" charged.
- a showing that the applicant is a "prevailing party"
- a showing that the applicant is "eligible to receive an award"
- a limit on the net worth of the party (see Net worth)
- an allegation that "the position of the United States was not substantially justified" (see Substantial Justification and Special Circumstances and Scarborough v. Principi, 541 U.S. 401, 415-16).

== Time for filing ==
An applicant for attorney's fees under the EAJA must file an application within thirty days of the final judgment in the civil action. 28 U.S.C. § 2412(d)(1)(B). Scarborough, 541 U.S. 401 (2004). However, an EAJA application may be filed until thirty days after a judgment becomes “final and not appealable”. 28 U.S.C. §§ 2412(d)(1)(B) and (d)(2)(G). In some instances when an agency of the United States is a party in this case, a notice of appeal may be filed within 60 days of entry of the judgment. Fed. R. App. P. 4(a)(1). Shalala v. Schaefer, 509 U.S. 292 (1993). See Melkonyan v. Sullivan, 501 U.S. 89 (1991), where the Supreme Court ruled that the filing period starts to accrue only after the time to appeal has expired for all parties.

== Net worth ==
A party must meet the threshold requirement of having a net worth not in excess of $7,000,000 for any owner of an unincorporated business, or any partnership, corporation, association, unit of local government, or organization. Or, $2,000,000 at the time the action was filed for an individual. 28 U. S. C. §2412(d)(2)(B)).

== Substantial Justification and Special Circumstances ==
The court must determine whether “the position of the United States was substantially justified or . . . special circumstances make an award unjust.” 28 U.S.C. § 2412(d)(1)(A). The government has the burden of proving its action is substantially justified or that circumstances make an award of attorney's fees unjust. Scarborough v. Principi, 541 U.S. 401 (2004) citing Pierce v. Underwood, 487 U. S. 552, 567 (1988); id., at 575 (Brennan, J., concurring in part and concurring in judgment); Davidson v. Veneman, 317 F. 3d 503, 506 (CA5 2003); Lauer v. Barnhart, 321 F. 3d 762, 764 (CA8 2003); Libas, Ltd. v. United States, 314 F. 3d 1362, 1365 (CA Fed. 2003). See also H. R. Rep. No. 96-1005, at 10 ("[T]he strong deterrents to contesting Government action that currently exis[t] require that the burden of proof rest with the Government.").

In Pierce, the Supreme Court held that the position of the United States is substantially justified if it is “justified in substance or in the main--that is, justified to a degree that could satisfy a reasonable person." Pierce v. Underwood, 487 U.S. 552, 565 (1988). The Pierce Court provided further guidance on this standard, noting, ". . . [A] position can be substantially justified even though it is not correct, and we believe that it can be substantially (i.e., for the most part) justified if a reasonable person could think it correct, that is, if it has a reasonable basis in law and fact." Id. at 566 n.2.

The United States Court of Appeals for the Seventh Circuit has described the substantial justification standard as requiring that the government show that its position was grounded in "'(1) a reasonable basis in truth for the facts alleged; (2) a reasonable basis in law for the theory propounded; and (3) a reasonable connection between the facts alleged and the legal theory advanced.'" United States v. Hallmark Constr. Co., 200 F.3d 1076, 1080 (7th Cir. 2000) quoting Phil Smidt & Son, Inc. v. NLRB, 810 F.2d 638, 642 (7th Cir. 1987) quoting Donovan v. DialAmerica Mkting, Inc., 757 F.2d 1376, 1389 (3d Cir. 1985). Furthermore, some courts have held the “court only needs to find one reason for finding the ALJ was not substantially justified in order to allow EAJA fees . . .” Mallette v. Sullivan, 1990 WL 19894, *3-*5 (N.D. Il. 1990).

Congress's inclusion in the EAJA of the substantial justification standard manifests its intent not to permit a prevailing party to automatically recover fees. See Federal Election Comm'n v. Rose, 806 F.2d 1081, 1087 (D.C. Cir. 1986). As the Cummings court observed, these two standards of review “are used at different stages and involve different tests.” Cummings v. Sullivan, 950 F.2d 492, 498 (7th Cir. 1991). A court at the EAJA stage must take a fresh look at the case from an EAJA perspective, and reach a judgment independent from the ultimate merits decision. Rose, 806 F.2d at 1087–90. Thus, the government's position may be substantially justified even if its decision was not supported by substantial evidence.

In Pierce v. Underwood, 487 U.S. 552 (1988), the Supreme Court held that the government's position is substantially justified if it is “justified to a degree that could satisfy a reasonable person,” that is, “if it has a reasonable basis in law and fact.” Id. at 565-66 & n.2. The Pierce Court rejected the position that substantial justification requires more than mere reasonableness. Id. 487 U.S. at 567–68. See also Brouwers v. Bowen, 823 F.2d 273, 275 (8th Cir. 1987) (“the substantial justification standard is a lesser standard than the substantial evidence standard used to review administrative determinations”) (citations omitted).

“Substantially justified” does not mean “justified to a high degree,” but rather has been said to be satisfied if there is a “genuine dispute,” or if reasonable people could differ as to the appropriateness of the contested action. Stein v. Sullivan, 966 F.2d 317, 320 (7th Cir. 1992) (citing Pierce, 487 U.S. at 565). Thus, a loss on the merits does not equate with a lack of substantial justification. See Pierce, 487 U.S. at 569 (“[O]bviously, the fact that one other court agreed or disagreed with the Government does not establish whether its position was substantially justified. Conceivably, the Government could take a position that is not substantially justified, yet win; even more likely, it could take a position that is substantially justified, yet lose.”); United States v. Hallmark Construction Co., 200 F.3d 1076, 1080 (7th Cir. 2000). Thus, a court's statement in its merits decision that a government agency did not have a “rational ground” for denying benefits does not imply a lack of substantial justification for the agency's position. Kolman v. Shalala, 39 F.3d 173, 177 (7th Cir. 1994). As the Seventh Circuit explained in Kolman, its statement that the agency did not have a rational ground for its decision was a reference to the test for invalidating agency action; at the EAJA stage, the test is “whether the agency had a rational ground for thinking it had a rational ground for its action.” Kolman, 39 F.3d at 177.

== Reasonableness of the fee ==
The applicant for EAJA fees has the burden of proving that the fees requested are reasonable. See Hensley v. Eckerhart, 461 U.S. 424, 437 (1983) (although Hensley dealt with attorney's fees under 42 U.S.C. § 1988, the standards which it sets out are applicable generally to attorney's fee cases); Ruckelshaus v. Sierra Club, 463 U.S. 680, 691-92 (1983).

== Amount of fees ==
Attorney fees shall not be awarded in excess of $125.00 per hour unless the court determines that an increase in the cost of living or other special factors justifies a higher fee. 28 U.S.C. § 2412(d)(2)(A). The movant bears the burden of producing satisfactory evidence of the prevailing market rate for the kind and quality of legal services rendered. Blum v. Stenson, 465 U.S. 886, 892 n. 11 (1984). Applicants for EAJA who claim and provide proof of inflation may be awarded attorney fees at an hourly fee in excess of $125.00 for work beginning after 1996 due to inflation. Failure to adjust the statutory cap for inflation might be considered an abuse of discretion. Sierra Club v. Sec'y of the Army, 820 F.2d 513, 521 (1st Cir. 1987); Trichilo v. Sec'y of Health and Human Services, 823 F.2d 702, 704-07 (2d Cir. 1987); Allen v. Bowen, 821 F.2d 963 (3d Cir. 1987); Ramon-Sepulveda v. INS, 863 F.2d 1458 (9th Cir. 1988); and U.S. v. A Leasehold Interest in Property, 789 F.Supp. 1385, 1394 (E.D. Mich. 1992).

== Costs ==
Some costs may be compensated by the EAJA, including federal court filing fee. 28 U.S.C. §§ 2412(a)(1) and (a)(2), and (d)(2)(A).

== Payment of fees to litigant and payment of government debts ==
In Astrue v. Ratliff, 560 U.S. 586 (2010) the Supreme Court unanimously held that an EAJA award is payable to the litigant, not his or her attorney, and is subject to offset to satisfy a pre-existing debt that the litigant owes to the United States.

== Proposed amendment ==
The Open Book on Equal Access to Justice Act (H.R. 2919; 113th Congress) was introduced into the United States House of Representatives on August 1, 2013. The bill would amend the Equal Access to Justice Act by requiring the Administrative Conference of the United States (ACUS) to prepare a report each year on the amount of fees and other expenses awarded by federal courts to nonfederal entities when they prevail in a case against the United States.
