= Identity fraud =

Use by one person of another person's personal information, without authorization

Identity fraud is the use by one person of another person's personal information, without authorization, to commit a crime or to deceive or defraud that other person or a third person. Most identity fraud is committed in the context of financial advantages, such as accessing a victim's credit card, bank accounts, or loan accounts. False or forged identity documents have been used in criminal activity (such as to gain access to security areas) or in dealings with government agencies, such as immigration.

A person's personal information may be surreptitiously obtained, commonly described as identity theft, in a variety of ways. A fraudster may use another person's basic personal details (such as name, address, username, and PIN) to access the victim's online accounts, including banking accounts, email, and social media accounts. Such access may be for the purpose of obtaining further personal information on the target. More seriously, the information may then be used in truly fraudulent activities, such as opening a credit card account in the victim's name and then charging purchases to that account, or the entering into a loan agreement in the victim's name.

Identity fraud may be committed without identity theft, as in the case of the fraudster being given someone's personal information for other reasons but uses it to commit fraud, or when the person whose identity is being used is colluding with the person committing the fraud. There have been numerous cases of organisations being hacked to obtain personal information. One case of identity theft was the 2011 hacking of the PlayStation Network, when personal and credit card information of 77 million accounts were stolen.

The unauthorized use of a stolen credit card is commonly not considered identity fraud, but may be considered consumer fraud. The use of fake names, ID cards, falsified or forged documents, and lying about their own age to simply "hide" their true identity is sometimes also regarded as identity fraud. Reasons for this type of identity fraud may include wanting to purchase tobacco or alcohol as a minor as well as to continue playing on a certain sports team or organization when that person is too old to compete.

== Identity theft ==
Identity theft is the unauthorized use of another's personal or financial information to defraud an individual or entity into obtaining goods or services. The term 'personal or financial information,' typically refers to a person's name, address, credit card, bank account number, Social Security number, or medical insurance account number. 'Goods or services,' may include bank accounts, credit card purchases, tax refund, a cell phone account, or dishonest claims for state benefits.

== Synthetic identity fraud ==
Synthetic identities are fake identities that combine fake information with actual ID data. For example, combining a real social security number along with a fake address and other synthetic data points. The fraudster can then use the fake identity to acquire driver's licenses, passports and other real ID as well as credit cards and other accounts. It is estimated that synthetic ID fraud accounts for 80% of all credit card fraud losses, and will increase 44% between 2014 and 2018, rising from $5 billion in annual losses to a projected $8 billion. A 2025 analysis by the Federal Reserve Bank of Boston found that synthetic identity fraud losses had reached an estimated $35 billion in 2023. The analysis also noted that fraudsters increasingly use generative artificial intelligence to automate the creation of synthetic identities, for example by fabricating records of synthetic family members so that a fake identity appears more legitimate.

== Children and identity theft ==
It is estimated that the identity of between 140,000 and 400,000 children are used fraudulently every year. A child's identity is uniquely desirable to identity thieves. Steve Toporoff, an attorney with the Federal Trade Commission's Division of Privacy and Identity Protection, says that while there is a feeling among industry insiders that child identity theft is a major problem, it is very difficult to quantify because, in most instances, people have no clue that they are victims until years after the fact.

== See also ==
- Carding (fraud)
- Criminal impersonation
