= Identity theft =

Deliberate use of someone else's identity

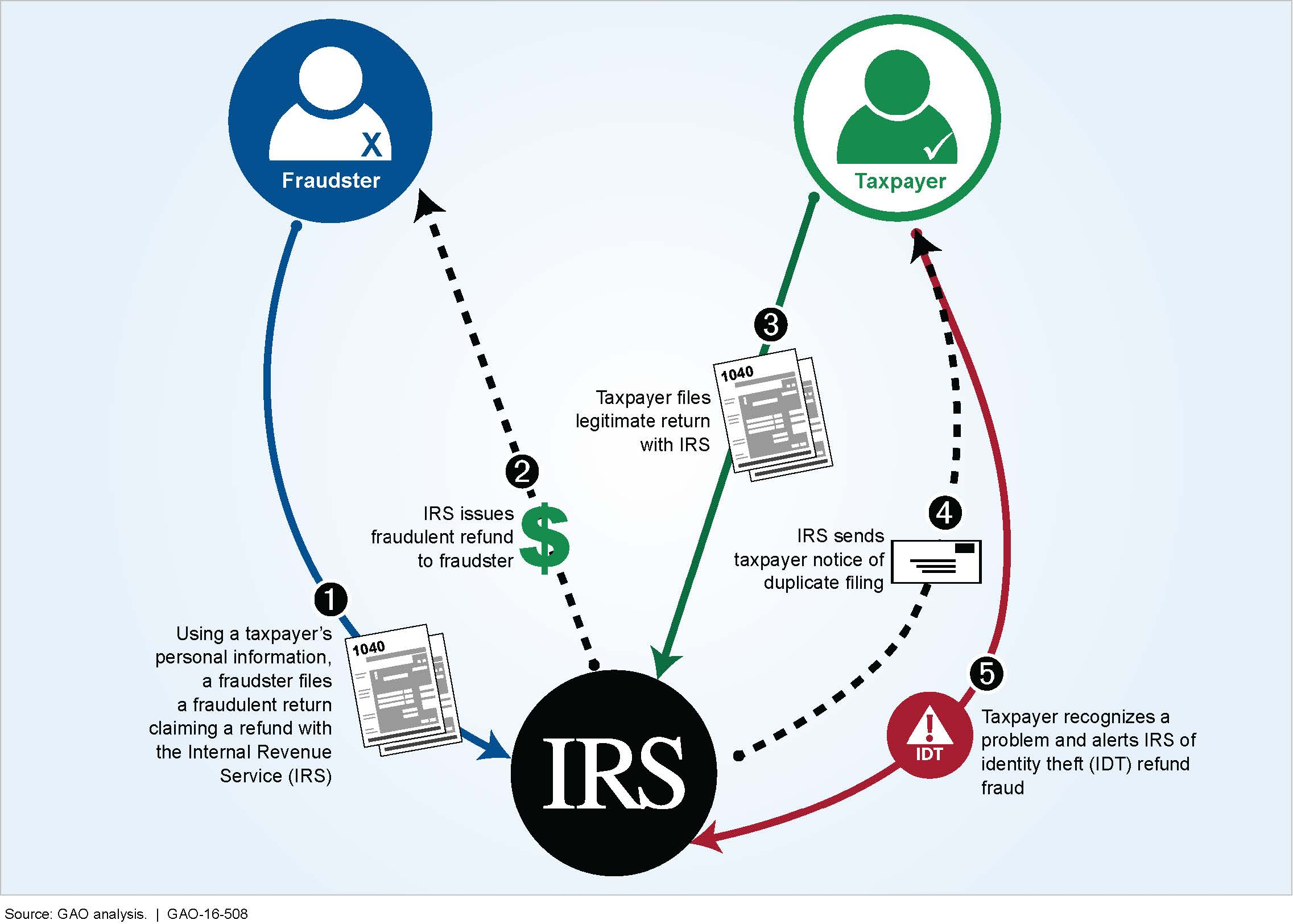
Example of an identity theft crime: 1. The fraudster files tax return paperwork in the victim's name, claiming a refund. 2. The IRS issues a refund to the fraudster. 3. The victim submits their legitimate tax return. 4. The IRS rejects the return as a duplicate.

Identity theft, identity piracy or identity infringement occurs when someone uses another person's personal identifying information, such as their name, identifying number, or credit card number, without their permission to commit fraud or other crimes. Coined in 1964, the term identity theft has been legally defined in both the UK and the U.S. as the theft of personally identifiable information. Identity theft involves deliberately using someone else's identity to gain financial advantages or obtain credit and other benefits. The person whose identity has been stolen may suffer adverse consequences, especially if they are held responsible for the perpetrator's actions. Personally identifiable information generally includes a person's name, date of birth, social security number, driver's license number, bank account or credit card numbers, PINs, electronic signatures, fingerprints, passwords, or any other information that can be used to access a person's financial resources.

Determining the link between data breaches and identity theft can be challenging, primarily because victims of identity theft often do not know how their personal information was obtained. According to a report done for the FTC, identity theft is not always detectable by the individual victims. Identity fraud is often, but not necessarily, the consequence of identity theft. Personal information can be stolen or misappropriated without being used to commit identity theft, such as when a major data breach occurs. A U.S. Government Accountability Office study determined that "most breaches have not resulted in detected incidents of identity theft". For example, in a data breach involving the theft of payment card information, involving four million records and at the time one of the largest data breaches ever, the company claimed the breach resulted in only about 1,800 instances of identity theft.

An October 2010 article entitled "Cyber Crime Made Easy" explained the level to which hackers are using malicious software. As Gunter Ollmann, Chief Technology Officer of security at Microsoft, said, "Interested in credit card theft? There's an app for that." This statement summed up the ease with which these hackers are accessing all kinds of information online. The new program for infecting users' computers was called Zeus, and the program is so hacker-friendly that even an inexperienced hacker can operate it. Although the hacking program is easy to use, that fact does not diminish the devastating effects that Zeus (or other software like Zeus) can do on a computer and the user. For example, programs like Zeus can steal credit card information, important documents, and even documents necessary for homeland security. If a hacker were to gain this information, it would mean nationwide identity theft or even a possible terrorist attack. The ITAC said that about 15 million Americans had their identity stolen in 2012.

== Types ==
Sources such as the Non-profit Identity Theft Resource Center sub-divide identity theft into five categories:

- Criminal identity theft (posing as another person when apprehended for a crime)
- Financial identity theft (using another's identity to obtain credit, goods, and services)
- Identity cloning (using another's information to assume his or her identity in daily life)
- Medical identity theft (using another's identity to obtain medical care or drugs)
- Child identity theft.

Identity theft may be used to facilitate or fund other crimes including illegal immigration, terrorism, phishing and espionage. There are cases of identity cloning to attack payment systems, including online credit card processing and medical insurance.

=== Identity cloning and concealment ===
In this situation, the identity thief impersonates someone else to conceal their true identity. Examples include illegal immigrants hiding their status, people hiding from creditors or other individuals, and those who want to appear "anonymous" for personal reasons. Another example is posers, a term used to describe people who use someone else's photos and information on social networking sites. Posers often create believable stories involving friends of the person they are imitating. Unlike identity theft used to obtain credit, which usually comes to light when the debts mount, concealment may continue indefinitely without being detected, particularly if the identity thief can obtain false credentials to pass various authentication tests in everyday life.

=== Criminal identity theft ===
Criminal identity theft is when a criminal fraudulently identifies themselves to police as another individual at the point of arrest. In some cases, criminals have obtained state-issued identity documents using credentials stolen from others, or have simply presented a fake ID. Provided the subterfuge works, charges may be placed under the victim's name, letting the criminal avoid charges. Victims might only learn of such incidents by chance, for example by receiving a court summons, discovering their driver's licenses are suspended when stopped for minor traffic violations, or through background checks performed for employment purposes.

It can be difficult for the victim of criminal identity theft to clear their record. The steps required to clear the victim's criminal record depend on which jurisdiction the crime occurred and whether the true identity of the criminal can be determined. The victim might need to locate the original arresting officers and prove their own identity by some reliable means such as fingerprinting or DNA testing and may need to go to a court hearing to be cleared of the charges. Obtaining an expungement of court records may also be required. Authorities might permanently maintain the victim's name as an alias for the criminal's true identity in their criminal records databases. One problem that victims of criminal identity theft may encounter is that various data aggregators might still have incorrect criminal records in their databases even after court and police records are corrected, potentially leading to future background checks returning incorrect criminal records.

=== Synthetic identity theft ===
A variation of identity theft that has recently become more common is synthetic identity theft, in which identities are completely or partially fabricated. The most common technique involves combining a real social security number with a name and birthdate other than the ones associated with the number. Synthetic identity theft is more difficult to track because it does not show on either credit report and may appear as an entirely new file at the credit bureau or as a subfile on one of the victim's credit reports. Synthetic identity theft primarily harms the creditors who unwittingly grant credit. Individual victims can be affected if their names become confused with the synthetic identities, or if negative information in their subfiles impacts their credit ratings.

=== Medical identity theft ===
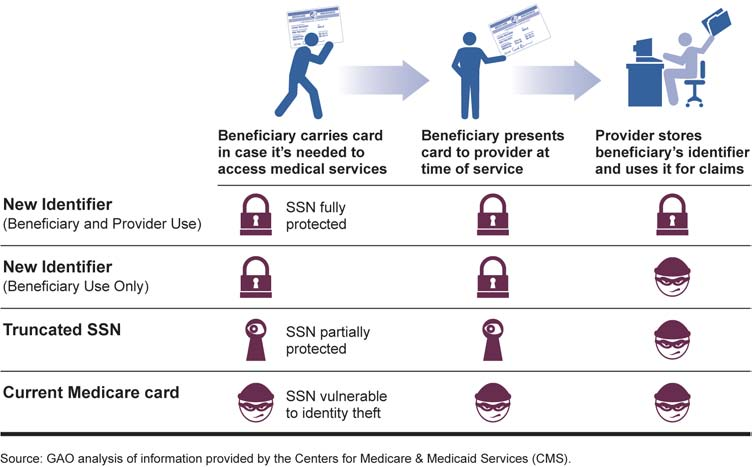
US Government Accountability Office diagram showing the identity theft risk associated with social security numbers on Medicare cards

Privacy researcher Pam Dixon, the founder of the World Privacy Forum, coined the term medical identity theft and released the first major report about this issue in 2006. In the report, she defined the crime for the first time and made the plight of victims public. The report's definition of the crime is that medical identity theft occurs when someone seeks medical care under the identity of another person. Insurance theft is also very common, if a thief has a victim's insurance information or insurance card, they can seek medical attention posing as the victim. In addition to risks of financial harm common to all forms of identity theft, the thief's medical history may be added to the victim's medical records. Inaccurate information in the victim's records is difficult to correct and may affect future insurability or cause doctors to rely on misinformation to deliver inappropriate care. After the publication of the report, which contained a recommendation that consumers receive notifications of medical data breach incidents, California passed a law requiring this, and then finally HIPAA was expanded to also require medical breach notification when breaches affect 500 or more people. Data collected and stored by hospitals and other organizations such as medical aid schemes is up to 10 times more valuable to cybercriminals than credit card information.

=== Child identity theft ===
Child identity theft occurs when a minor's identity is used by another person for the impostor's personal gain. The impostor can be a family member, a friend, or even a stranger who targets children. The Social Security numbers of children are valued because they do not have any information associated with them. Thieves can establish lines of credit, obtain driver's licenses, or even buy a house using a child's identity. This fraud can go undetected for years, as most children do not discover the problem until years later. Child identity theft is fairly common, and studies have shown that the problem is growing. The largest study on child identity theft, as reported by Richard Power of the Carnegie Mellon Cylab with data supplied by AllClear ID, found that of 40,000 children, 10.2% were victims of identity theft.

The Federal Trade Commission (FTC) estimates that about nine million people will be victims of identity theft in the United States per year. It was also estimated that in 2008; 630,000 people under the age of 19 were victims of theft. This then gave the victims a debt of about $12,799.

Children in foster care are particularly vulnerable to identity theft because their SSN is being shared with multiple people and agencies. Foster children may be victims of identity theft within their own families and among relatives. Young people in foster care who are victims of this crime are usually left alone to struggle and figure out how to fix their newly formed bad credit.

The emergence of children's identities on social media has also contributed to a rise in incidents of digital kidnapping and identity theft. Digital kidnapping involves individuals stealing online images of children and misrepresenting them as their own.

=== Financial identity theft ===
The most common type of identity theft is related to finance. Financial identity theft includes obtaining credit, loans, goods, and services while claiming to be someone else.

=== Tax identity theft ===
One of the major identity theft categories is tax-related identity theft. The most common method is to use a person's authentic name, address, and Social Security Number to file a tax return with false information, and have the resulting refund direct-deposited into a bank account controlled by the thief. The thief in this case can also try to get a job and then their employer will report the income of the real taxpayer, this then results in the taxpayer getting in trouble with the IRS.

The 14039 Form to the IRS is a form that will help one fight against a theft like tax theft. This form will put the IRS on alert and someone who believed they have been a victim of tax-related theft will be given an Identity Protection Personal Identification Number (IP PIN), which is a 6 digit code used in replacing an SSN for filing tax returns.

== Techniques for obtaining and exploiting personal information ==
Identity thieves typically obtain and exploit personally identifiable information about individuals, or various credentials they use to authenticate themselves, to impersonate them. Examples include:

- Using public records about individual citizens, published in official registers such as electoral rolls
- Stealing cheques (checks) to acquire banking information, including account numbers and bank codes
- Guessing Social Security numbers by using information found on Internet social networks such as Twitter and MySpace
- Using phishing attacks or other social engineering techniques to trick individuals into revealing sensitive information such as login credentials or financial data

In some cases, after obtaining a victim’s personal information, identity thieves may alter the victim’s contact details such as their mailing address, phone number, or email to prevent notifications from reaching them and to delay detection of fraudulent activity.

== Individual identity protection ==
The acquisition of personal identifiers is made possible through serious breaches of privacy. For consumers, this is usually a result of them naively providing their personal information or login credentials to the identity thieves (e.g., in a phishing attack) but identity-related documents such as credit cards, bank statements, utility bills, checkbooks, etc. may also be physically stolen from vehicles, homes, offices, and not the least letterboxes, or directly from victims by pickpockets and bag snatchers. Guardianship of personal identifiers by consumers is the most common intervention strategy recommended by the US Federal Trade Commission, Canadian Phone Busters and most sites that address identity theft. Such organizations offer recommendations on how individuals can prevent their information from falling into the wrong hands.

Identity theft can be partially mitigated by not identifying oneself unnecessarily (a form of information security control known as risk avoidance). This implies that organizations, IT systems, and procedures should not demand excessive amounts of personal information or credentials for identification and authentication. Requiring, storing, and processing personal identifiers (such as Social Security number, national identification number, driver's license number, credit card number, etc.) increases the risks of identity theft unless this valuable personal information is adequately secured at all times. Committing personal identifiers to memory is a sound practice that can reduce the risks of a would-be identity thief from obtaining these records. To help in remembering numbers such as social security numbers and credit card numbers, it is helpful to consider using mnemonic techniques or memory aids such as the mnemonic Major System.

Identity thieves sometimes impersonate dead people, using personal information obtained from death notices, gravestones, and other sources to exploit delays between the death and the closure of the person's accounts, the inattentiveness of grieving families, and weaknesses in the processes for credit-checking. Such crimes may continue for some time until the deceased's families or the authorities notice and react to anomalies. In Britain, the ploy of using the birth certificate of a deceased person to obtain a false identity, famously used in the thriller novel and film The Day of the Jackal, is known to have resulted in thousands of fraudulent passports issued before the practice was effectively prevented in 2003.

In the mid-2000s, commercial identity theft protection/insurance services have become available. These services purport to help protect the individual from identity theft, or help detect that identity theft has occurred, in exchange for a monthly fee. The services may include setting fraud alerts on the individual's credit files with the three major credit bureaus or setting up credit report monitoring with credit bureaus, which are also available for free. While identity theft protection/insurance services have been heavily marketed, their value has been called into question.

== Potential outcomes ==
Identity theft is a serious problem in the United States. In a 2018 study, it was reported that 60 million Americans' identities had been wrongfully acquired. In response, under advisement from the Identity Theft Resource Center, some new bills have been implemented to improve security such as requiring electronic signatures and social security verification.

Several types of identity theft are used to gather information, one of the most common types occurs when consumers make online purchases. A study was conducted with 190 people to determine the relationship between the constructs of fear of financial losses and reputational damages. The conclusions of this study revealed that identity theft was a positive correlation with reputable damages. The relationship between perceived risk and online purchase intention were negative. The significance of this study reveals that online companies are more aware of the potential harm that can be done to their consumers, therefore they are searching for ways to reduce the perceived risk of consumers and not lose out on business.

Victims of identity theft may face years of effort proving to the legal system that they are the true person, leading to emotional strain and financial losses. Most identity theft is perpetrated by a family member of the victim, and some may not be able to obtain new credit cards or open new bank accounts or loans.

== Identity protection by organizations ==
In their May 1998 testimony before the United States Senate, the Federal Trade Commission (FTC) discussed the sale of Social Security numbers and other personal identifiers by credit-raters and data miners. The FTC agreed to the industry's self-regulating principles restricting access to information on credit reports. According to the industry, the restrictions vary according to the category of customer. Credit reporting agencies gather and disclose personal and credit information to a wide business client base.

Poor stewardship of personal data by organizations, resulting in unauthorized access to sensitive data, can expose individuals to the risk of identity theft. The Privacy Rights Clearinghouse has documented over 900 individual data breaches by US companies and government agencies since January 2005, which together have involved over 200 million total records containing sensitive personal information, many containing social security numbers. Poor corporate diligence standards which can result in data breaches include:

- failure to shred confidential information before throwing it into dumpsters
- failure to ensure adequate network security
- credit card numbers stolen by call center agents and people with access to call recordings
- the theft of laptop computers or portable media being carried off-site containing vast amounts of personal information. The use of strong encryption on these devices can reduce the chance of data being misused should a criminal obtain them.
- the brokerage of personal information to other businesses without ensuring that the purchaser maintains adequate security controls
- Failure of governments, when registering sole proprietorships, partnerships, and corporations, to determine if the officers listed in the Articles of Incorporation are who they say they are. This potentially allows criminals access to personal information through credit rating and data mining services.

The failure of corporate or government organizations to protect consumer privacy, client confidentiality and political privacy has been criticized for facilitating the acquisition of personal identifiers by criminals.

Using various types of biometric information, such as fingerprints, for identification and authentication has been cited as a way to thwart identity thieves, however, there are technological limitations and privacy concerns associated with these methods as well.

== Market ==
There is an active market for buying and selling stolen personal information, which occurs mostly in darknet markets but also in other black markets. People increase the value of the stolen data by aggregating it with publicly available data, and sell it again for a profit, increasing the damage that can be done to the people whose data was stolen.

== Legal responses ==
=== International ===
In March 2014, after it was learned two passengers with stolen passports were on board Malaysia Airlines Flight 370, which went missing on 8 March 2014. It came to light that Interpol maintains a database of 40 million lost and stolen travel documents from 157 countries, which Interpol makes available to governments and the public, including airlines and hotels. The Stolen and Lost Travel Documents (SLTD) database, however, is rarely used. Big News Network (which is based in the UAE) reported that Interpol Secretary-General Ronald K. Noble told a forum in Abu Dhabi in the previous month, "The bad news is that, despite being incredibly cost-effective and deployable to virtually anywhere in the world, only a handful of countries are systematically using SLTD to screen travelers. The result is a major gap in our global security apparatus that is left vulnerable to exploitation by criminals and terrorists."

=== Australia ===
In Australia, each state has enacted laws that deal with different aspects of identity or fraud issues. Some states have now amended relevant criminal laws to reflect crimes of identity theft, such as the Criminal Law Consolidation Act 1935 (SA), Crimes Amendment (Fraud, Identity and Forgery Offences) Act 2009, and also in Queensland under the Criminal Code 1899 (QLD). Other states and territories are in states of development in respect of regulatory frameworks relating to identity theft such as Western Australia in respect of the Criminal Code Amendment (Identity Crime) Bill 2009.

At the Commonwealth level, under the Criminal Code Amendment (Theft, Fraud, Bribery & Related Offences) Act 2000 which amended certain provisions within the Criminal Code Act 1995,

135.1 General dishonesty

(3) A person is guilty of an offense if a) the person does anything with the intention of dishonestly causing a loss to another person; and b) the other person is a Commonwealth entity.

Penalty: Imprisonment for 5 years.

Between 2014 and 2015 in Australia, there were 133,921 fraud and deception offences, an increase of 6% from previous year. The total cost reported by the Attorney General Department was:

Total costs
| Fraud category | Cost per incident | Total direct cost |
|---|---|---|
| Commonwealth fraud | $2,111 | $353,866,740 |
| Personal fraud | $400 | $656,550,506 |
| Police recorded fraud | $4,412 per unrecorded incident $27,981 per recorded incident | $3,260,141,049 |

There are also high indirect costs associated as a direct result of an incident. For example, the total indirect costs for police recorded fraud is $5,774,081.

Likewise, each state has enacted its own privacy laws to prevent the misuse of personal information and data. The Commonwealth Privacy Act applies only to Commonwealth and territory agencies and to certain private-sector bodies (where, for example, they deal with sensitive records, such as medical records, or they have more than $3 million in turnover PA).

=== Canada ===
Under section 402.2 of the Criminal Code,

Everyone commits an offense who knowingly obtains or possesses another person's identity information in circumstances giving rise to a reasonable inference that the information is intended to be used to commit an indictable offense that includes fraud, deceit, or falsehood as an element of the offense. is guilty of an indictable offense and liable to imprisonment for a term of not more than five years; or is guilty of an offense punishable on summary conviction.

Under section 403 of the Criminal Code,

(1) Everyone commits an offense who fraudulently personates another person, living or dead,

(a) with intent to gain advantage for themselves or another person; (b) with intent to obtain any property or an interest in any property; (c) with intent to cause disadvantage to the person being personated or another person; or (d) with intent to avoid arrest or prosecution or to obstruct, pervert or defeat the course of justice.

is guilty of an indictable offense and liable to imprisonment for a term of not more than 10 years; or guilty of an offense punishable on summary conviction.

In Canada, Privacy Act (federal legislation) covers only federal government, agencies and crown corporations. Each province and territory has its own privacy law and privacy commissioners to limit the storage and use of personal data. For the private sector, the purpose of the Personal Information Protection and Electronic Documents Act (2000, c. 5) (known as PIPEDA) is to establish rules to govern the collection, use, and disclosure of personal information; except for the provinces of Quebec, Ontario, Alberta and British Columbia where provincial laws have been deemed substantially similar.

==== Proposed legislation ====
- Bill C-27 (39th Canadian Parliament, 2nd Session)

=== France ===
In France, a person convicted of identity theft can be sentenced up to five years in prison and fined up to €75,000.

=== Hong Kong ===
Under HK Laws. Chap 210 Theft Ordinance, sec. 16A Fraud:

(1) If any person by any deceit (whether or not the deceit is the sole or main inducement) and with intent to defraud induces another person to commit an act or make an omission, which results either-

(a) in benefit to any person other than the second-mentioned person; or (b) in prejudice or a substantial risk of prejudice to any person other than the first-mentioned person,

the first-mentioned person commits the offense of fraud and is liable on conviction upon indictment to imprisonment for 14 years.

The Personal Data (Privacy) Ordinance (PDPO) regulates the collection, use and retention of personal information in Hong Kong. It also provides citizens the right to request information held by businesses and the government to the extent provided by this law. The PDPO establishes the Office of the Privacy Commissioner for Personal Data which enforces the law and advises on the use of personal data.

=== India ===
Under the Information Technology Act 2000 Chapter IX Sec 66C:

SECTION 66C

PUNISHMENT FOR IDENTITY THEFT

Whoever, fraudulently or dishonestly makes use of the electronic signature, password, or any other unique identification feature of any other person, shall be punished with imprisonment of either description for a term which may extend to three years and shall also be liable to fine which may extend to rupees one lakh.

=== Philippines ===
The Philippines, which ranks eighth in the numbers of users of Facebook and other social networking sites (such as Twitter, Multiply and Tumblr), has been known as a source of various identity theft problems. Identities of people who carelessly put personal information on their profiles can easily be stolen just by simple browsing. Some people meet online, get to know each other through Facebook chat, and exchange messages that share private information. Others get romantically involved with online friends and end up sharing too much information (such as their social security number, bank account, home address, and company address).

This phenomenon leads to the creation of the Cybercrime Prevention Act of 2012 (Republic Act No. 10175). Section 2 of this act states that it recognizes the importance of communication and multimedia for the development, exploitation, and dissemination of information, but violators will be punished by the law through imprisonment or a fine upwards of ₱200,000, but not exceeding ₱1,000,000, or (depending on the damage caused) both.

=== Sweden ===
Sweden has had relatively few problems with identity theft because only Swedish identity documents were accepted for identity verification. Stolen documents are traceable by banks and certain other institutions. Banks are required to check the identity of anyone withdrawing money or getting loans. If a bank gives money to someone using an identity document that has been reported as stolen, the bank must take this loss. Since 2008, any EU passport is valid in Sweden for identity verification, and Swedish passports are valid all over the EU. This makes it harder to detect stolen documents, but banks in Sweden still must ensure that stolen documents are not accepted.

Other types of identity theft have become more common in Sweden. One common example is ordering a credit card to someone who has an unlocked letterbox and is not home during the daytime. The thief steals the letter with the credit card and the letter with the code, which typically arrives a few days later. Usage of a stolen credit card is difficult in Sweden since an identity document or a PIN code is normally demanded. If a shop does not demand either, it must take the loss from accepting a stolen credit card. The practice of observing someone using their credit card's PIN code, stealing the credit card, or skimming it, and then using the credit card has become more common.

Legally, Sweden is an open society. The Principle of Public Access states that all information (e.g. addresses, incomes, taxes) kept by public authorities must be available for anyone, except in certain cases (for example, the addresses of people who need to hide are restricted). This makes fraud easier.

Until 2016, there were no laws that specifically prohibited using someone's identity. Instead, there were only laws regarding any indirect damages caused. Impersonating anyone else for financial gain is a type of fraud in the Criminal Code (Swedish: brottsbalken). Impersonating anyone else to discredit them by hacking into their social media accounts and provoke is considered libel. However, it is difficult to convict someone of committing this crime. In late 2016, a new law was introduced which partially banned undetermined identity usage.

=== United Kingdom ===
In the United Kingdom, personal data is protected by the Data Protection Act 1998. The Act covers all personal data which an organization may hold, including names, birthday and anniversary dates, addresses, and telephone numbers.

Under English law (which extends to Wales but not to Northern Ireland or Scotland), the deception offences under the Theft Act 1968 increasingly contend with identity theft situations. In R v Seward (2005) EWCA Crim 1941, the defendant was acting as the "frontman" in the use of stolen credit cards and other documents to obtain goods. He obtained goods to the value of £10,000 for others who are unlikely ever to be identified. The Court of Appeal considered a sentencing policy for deception offenses involving "identity theft" and concluded that a prison sentence was required. Henriques J. said at para 14: "Identity fraud is a particularly pernicious and prevalent form of dishonesty calling for, in our judgment, deterrent sentences."

Cifas, a fraud prevention nonprofit in the UK, said there were 421,000 cases of fraud reported in the UK in 2024, with 59% of cases related to identity fraud. Cifas reported more than 444,000 cases in its National Fraud Database in 2025, of which more than 242,000 (54%) were identity fraud.

=== United States ===
The increase in crimes of identity theft led to the drafting of the Identity Theft and Assumption Deterrence Act. In 1998, The Federal Trade Commission appeared before the United States Senate. The FTC discussed crimes which exploit consumer credit to commit loan fraud, mortgage fraud, lines-of-credit fraud, credit card fraud, commodities and services frauds. The Identity Theft and Assumption Deterrence Act (2003) [ITADA] amended U.S. Code Title 18, § 1028 ("Fraud related to activity in connection with identification documents, authentication features, and information"). The statute now makes the possession of any "means of identification" to "knowingly transfer, possess, or use without lawful authority" a federal crime, alongside unlawful possession of identification documents. However, for federal jurisdiction to prosecute, the crime must include an "identification document" that either: (a) is purportedly issued by the United States, (b) is used or intended to defraud the United States, (c) is sent through the mail, or (d) is used in a manner that affects interstate or foreign commerce. See 18 U.S.C. § 1028(c). Punishment can be up to 5, 15, 20, or 30 years in federal prison, plus fines, depending on the underlying crime per 18 U.S.C. § 1028(b). In addition, punishments for the unlawful use of a "means of identification" were strengthened in § 1028A ("Aggravated Identity Theft"), allowing for a consecutive sentence under specific enumerated felony violations as defined in § 1028A(c)(1) through (11).

The Act also provides the Federal Trade Commission with authority to track the number of incidents and the dollar value of losses. Their figures relate mainly to consumer financial crimes and not the broader range of all identification-based crimes.

If charges are brought by state or local law enforcement agencies, different penalties apply to depend on the state.

Six Federal agencies conducted a joint task force to increase the ability to detect identity theft. Their joint recommendation on "red flag" guidelines is a set of requirements on financial institutions and other entities which furnish credit data to credit reporting services to develop written plans for detecting identity theft. The FTC has determined that most medical practices are considered creditors and are subject to requirements to develop a plan to prevent and respond to patient identity theft. These plans must be adopted by each organization's board of directors and monitored by senior executives.

Identity theft complaints as a percentage of all fraud complaints decreased from 2004 to 2006. The Federal Trade Commission reported that fraud complaints in general were growing faster than ID theft complaints. The findings were similar in two other FTC studies done in 2003 and 2005. In 2003, 4.6 percent of the US population said they were a victim of ID theft. In 2005, that number had dropped to 3.7 percent of the population. The commission's 2003 estimate was that identity theft accounted for some $52.6 billion of losses in the preceding year alone and affected more than 9.91 million Americans; the figure comprises $47.6 billion lost by businesses and $5 billion lost by consumers.

According to the U.S. Bureau of Justice Statistics, in 2010, 7% of US households experienced identity theft - up from 5.5% in 2005 when the figures were first assembled, but broadly flat since 2007. In 2012, approximately 16.6 million persons, or 7% of all U.S. residents age 16 or older, reported being victims of one or more incidents of identity theft.

At least two states, California and Wisconsin have created an Office of Privacy Protection to assist their citizens in avoiding and recovering from identity theft.

In 2009, Indiana created an Identity Theft Unit within their Office of Attorney General to educate and assist consumers in avoiding and recovering from identity theft as well as assist law enforcement in investigating and prosecuting identity theft crimes.

In Massachusetts in 2009–2010, Governor Deval Patrick committed to balancing consumer protection with the needs of small business owners. His Office of Consumer Affairs and Business Regulation announced certain adjustments to Massachusetts' identity theft regulations that maintain protections and also allow flexibility in compliance. These updated regulations went into effect on 1 March 2010. The regulations are clear that their approach to data security is a risk-based approach important to small businesses and might not handle a lot of personal information about customers.

The IRS has created the IRS Identity Protection Specialized Unit to help taxpayers who are victims of federal tax-related identity theft. Generally, the identity thief will use a stolen SSN to file a forged tax return and attempt to get a fraudulent refund early in the filing season. A taxpayer will need to fill out Form 14039, Identity Theft Affidavit.

As for the future of medical care and Medicaid, people are mostly concerned about cloud computing. The addition of using cloud information within the United States medicare system would institute easily accessible health information for individuals, but that also makes it easier for identity theft. Currently, new technology is being produced to help encrypt and protect files, which will create a smooth transition to cloud technology in the healthcare system.

==== Notification ====
All 50 states have enacted mandatory data breach notification laws. As a result, companies that report a data breach typically report it to all their customers.

== Spread and impact ==
Reports of consumer identity theft and other types of identity fraud are continuing to be lodged with consumer-protection agencies. In 2024, the Federal Trade Commission's Consumer Sentinel Network received over 1.1 million reports of identity theft, representing 18% of all reports received by the network during the year. The FBI's Internet Crime Complaint Center (IC3) received 31,675 complaints classified as identity theft in 2025, up from 21,403 in 2024, with reported losses of $185,832,657.

Misuse of personal or financial information obtained through data breaches, stolen documents, accounts compromised or through deceptive communications, can lead to identity theft. The risks of data breaches can continue after they've been compromised, as stolen personal information can be used for fraud, the U.S. Government Accountability Office has said.

A bad actor who gains access to someone else's personal information can use it to open accounts, file tax returns, or apply for loans or services in the victim's name. The Federal Trade Commission recommends that consumers review their financial statements and credit reports for any unfamiliar accounts or transactions, and that those who have the option use multi-factor authentication.

In the United Kingdom, the Home Office reported that identity fraud costs the UK economy £1.2 billion annually (experts believe that the real figure could be much higher) although privacy groups object to the validity of these numbers, arguing that they are being used by the government to push for introduction of national ID cards. Confusion over exactly what constitutes identity theft has led to claims that statistics may be exaggerated. An extensively reported study from Microsoft Research in 2011 finds that estimates of identity theft losses contain enormous exaggerations, writing that surveys "are so compromised and biased that no faith whatever can be placed in their findings."

== Notable identity thieves and cases ==
- 2017 Equifax security breach – American consumer credit reporting agency
- 2007 UK child benefit data misplacement – Data security scandal in the UK
- Frank Abagnale – American security consultant and convicted fraudster
- Albert Gonzalez – American computer hacker and criminal
- Yuri Kondratyuk – Soviet engineer and mathematician (1897–1942)
- Charles Stopford – Security consultant and impostor (born 1962)

== See also ==
- Account verification – Process of verifying ownership of a website account
- Identity score
- Impersonation – Art form or criminal act
- Impostor – List of people acting under false identity
