= Economic history of the Philippines (1965–1986) =

Real GDP per capita development of the Philippines, 1965 to 1986

The economic history of the Philippines during the Marcos regime (1965-1986) was a period of stress for the economy of the Philippines under Ferdinand Marcos.

The first years of Marcos' administration saw continued economic growth of previous administrations of the Third Philippine Republic, peaking at nearly 9% in 1973 and 1976. However, in the later years, the worst recession in Philippine history occurred, with the economy contracting by 7.3% in both 1984 and 1985. Gross domestic product (GDP) grew from $5.27 billion in 1964 to $37.14 billion in 1982, before declining to $30.7 billion in 1985. This included growth from $8 billion in 1972 to $32.45 billion in 1980 – 6% per year, its best results since 1945. The economy also grew despite global oil shocks following the 1973 and 1979 energy crises.

The government's policy of establishing monopolies resulted in significant income inequality, corruption, and capital flight. Average monthly wage income fell by 20% from 1972 to 1980. By 1981, the wealthiest 10% of the population was receiving twice as much income as the bottom 60%. Poverty grew from 41% in the 1960s to 59% in 1986. The unemployment rate increased from 3.9% in 1975 to 12.6% in 1985.

The dramatic rise and fall of the Philippine economy during this period is attributed to the Marcos administration's use of foreign loans (debt-driven as opposed to productivity-driven growth). The external debt of the Philippines rose more than 70-fold from $360 million in 1962 to US$2.3 billion in 1970 to US$17.2 billion in 1980 to $26.2 billion in 1985, leading the Philippines to become one of Asia's most indebted nations. At the end of 1979, the ratio of debt to GDP was about the same as South Korea.

During his reign, the Filipino peso fell from 3.9 to 20.53 to the United States dollar.

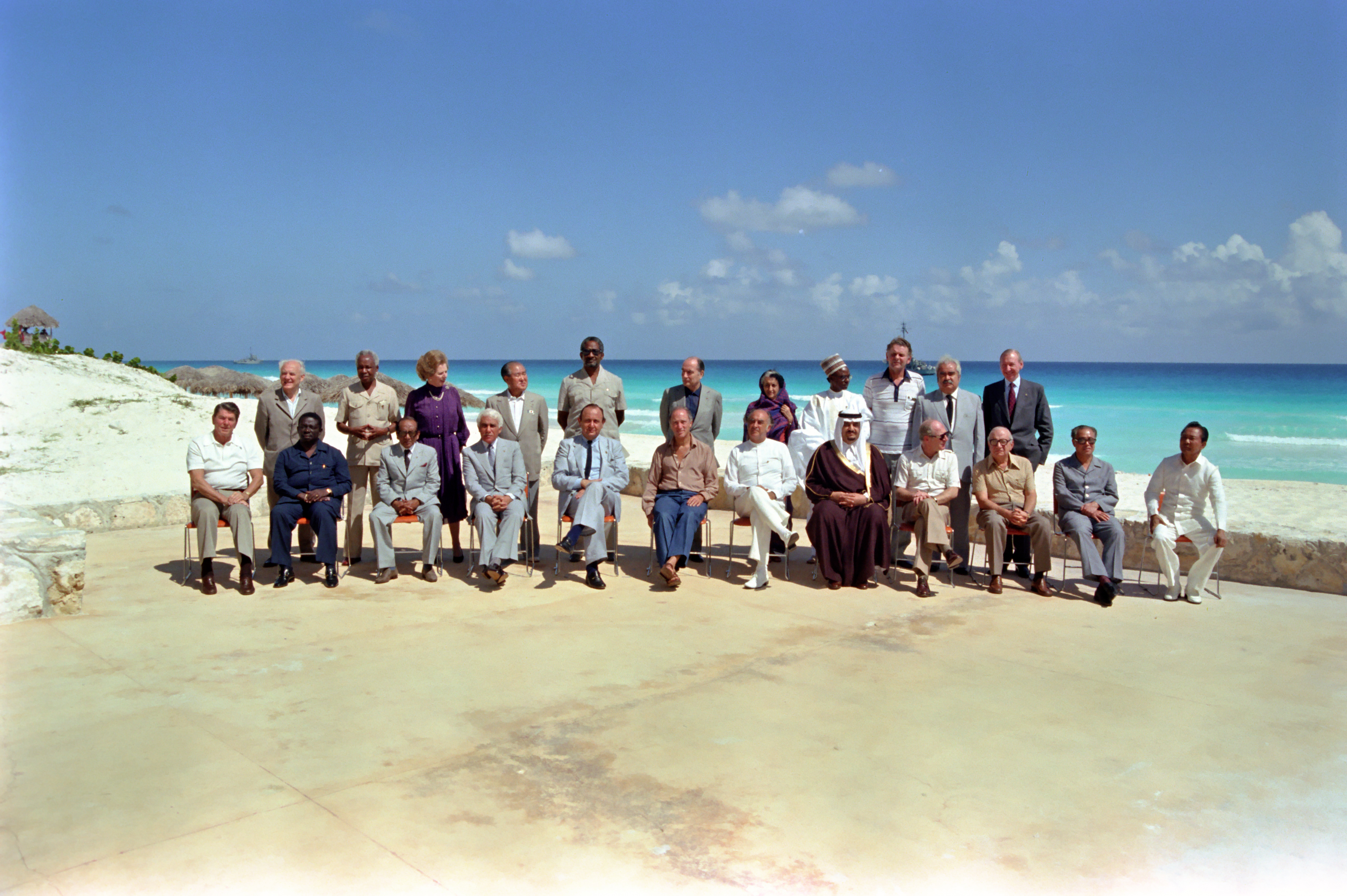
Marcos at the North–South Summit on International Cooperation and Development in Cancun alongside other world leaders including I. Gandhi, F. Mitterrand, R. Reagan, M. Thatcher, K. Waldheim, Zhao Ziyang; October 23, 1981

== Background: pre-1965 ==
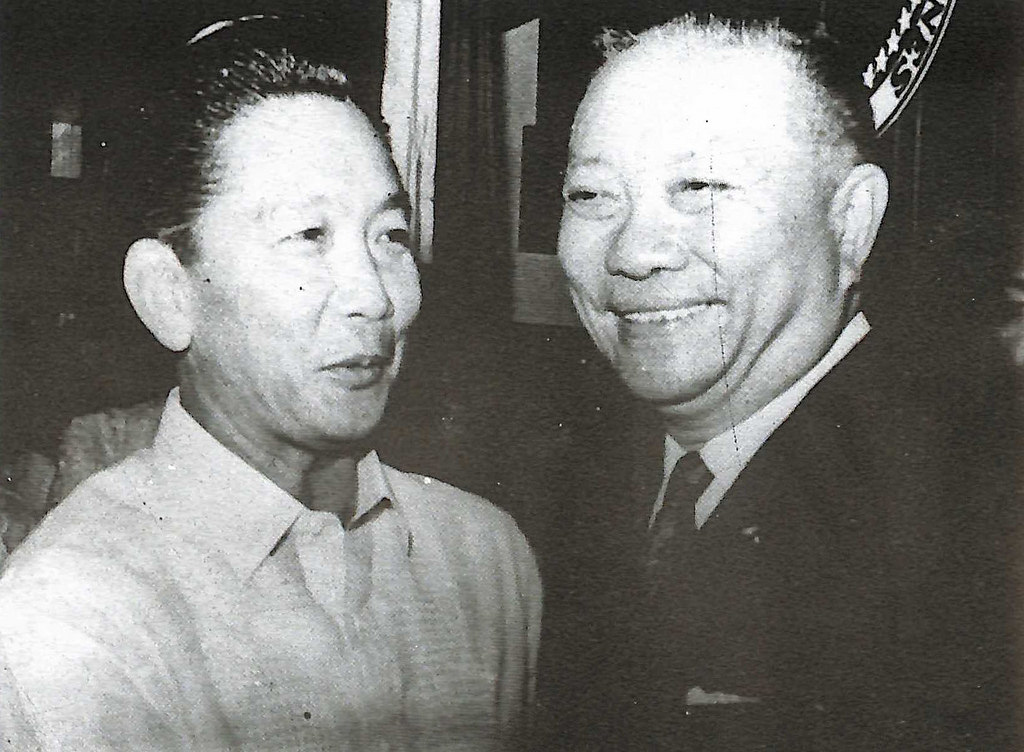
Ferdinand Marcos with Fernando Lopez, whom he would later tap as vice president during his first presidential campaign.

Before Marcos became President in 1965, the Philippines was the 7th largest economy in Asia, and 30th largest economy worldwide.

From the 1960s until the declaration of martial law, the Philippine economy was primarily agricultural. 60% of the labor force worked in agriculture in 1957 and 1964. Following an economic strategy of import substitution industrialization, the Philippine economy before Marcos was characterized by growing industrial production in sectors including textiles, clothing, metalworks, machinery and petroleum products.

New high-yielding crop varieties and new irrigation and mechanization techniques aided the agriculture sector. International collaboration was pursued, most notably with the International Rice Research Institute.

Many sectors of the Philippine economy were controlled by the traditional elite, who had grown powerful during the Spanish and American occupations of the Philippines and became major players in Philippine politics.

Within this sociopolitical climate, Ferdinand Marcos was able to position himself as an outsider, using his oratorical skills to promise what one historian would describe as "dazzling visions of rapid growth, impending development, and the alleviation of poverty".

By picking Fernando Lopez as his running mate, gaining support from the Iglesia ni Cristo voting bloc, and drawing on his wife Imelda, who charmed the vote-rich provinces of her native Visayas, Marcos won the 1965 Philippine presidential election against incumbent Diosdado Macapagal and independent challenger Raul Manglapus.

== First term (1965–1969) ==
Marcos built his campaign on the promise that his administration would change the Philippine economy and government. Marcos had inherited an economy was growing at a steady pace, but he gave the impression of even quicker results by using foreign loans to fund projects. He attracted a new breed of economic managers to work under his administration. These highly educated advisors soon became known as Marcos’ "technocrats". Marcos sought to also reshape the private sector by taking advantage of the then-highly regulated economy to favor a select group of loyal businessmen and industrialists. This marked the beginning of what came to be called "crony capitalism", and as the replacement of one set of elites with another. The short-term gains of his loan-fueled policies let Marcos remain popular with the public throughout most of his first term. This popularity ended as his excessive campaign spending led to a balance of payments crisis.

=== Buildup of control ===
Marcos launched political maneuvers designed to undermine the economic power and political influence of the Philippines’ traditional elite, and replace them with individuals loyal to him.

With strategic appointments and the systematic use of "behest loans", he elevated the influence of a favored group of industrialists and entrepreneurs such as Roberto Benedicto, who was put in charge of the then-government-owned Philippine National Bank, and Rodolfo Cuenca, whose Cuenca Construction Company expanded into what became the Construction and Development Corporation of the Philippines in 1966. These were the first to join the group of men later referred to as Marcos’ "cronies".

In an effort to undermine the power of local feudal lords, Marcos appointed Ernesto Maceda to the newly created Presidential Arm on Community Development, directly conducting development projects in Philippine barrios, instead of going through local politicians.

Some of Marcos’ most prominent early appointments earned him praise for bringing in a "new breed" of economic managers. Marcos’ campaign promises proved attractive to specialists and economic managers. Among these technocrats were Vicente Paterno, Rafael Salas, Alejandro Melchor, Onofre D. Corpuz, Cesar Virata, and Gerardo Sicat, who became the intellectual core of Marcos’ cabinet.

=== Omnibus Tax Law of 1969 ===
One major economic achievement of the first Marcos administration was tax reform. Because landlords dominated the legislature, no new tax initiatives had passed since the term of Carlos P. Garcia, in 1959. As a result, by the end of the 1960s, 70 to 75% of the country's tax revenues came from indirect taxes.

This reform came towards the end of Marcos’ first term. However, the new revenues it brought in were insufficient to finance Marcos' spending plans. Instead, the Marcos administration relied on foreign borrowing throughout his first term. The number of projects ramped up towards the end of his first term.

=== Deficit spending and foreign loans ===
The government deficit was 70% higher than that of the Macapagal administration. In order to cover the shortfall, Marcos relied heavily on foreign loans.

Marcos had defined performance as "Rice, Roads and Schoolbuildings". Loans mostly funded the construction of 1,201 km of new asphalt roads compared to the Macapagal administration which only managed to build 70; 2,124 km of gravel roads were built versus Macapagal' 118; and 15,831 linear meters of bridges versus only 651. Marcos constructed 38,705 permanent school buildings and 58,745 prefabricated school buildings in his first three years, versus Macapagal's 400 classrooms.

Marcos benefitted from his predecessors’ investments in rice production. The International Rice Research Institute had been conceived in Garcia’s term, and under Macapagal, work on a higher yield rice variety, IR8, began. This variety was introduced under Marcos as "Miracle Rice" and produced a boom in rice production so large that the Philippines was able to export US$5.9 million worth of rice in 1968.

=== Edifice complex ===
Marcos used publicly-funded construction projects as political and election material. Usually attributed to First Lady Imelda Marcos, these grandiosely designed projects were eventually labeled her "edifice complex".

== Balance of payments crisis ==
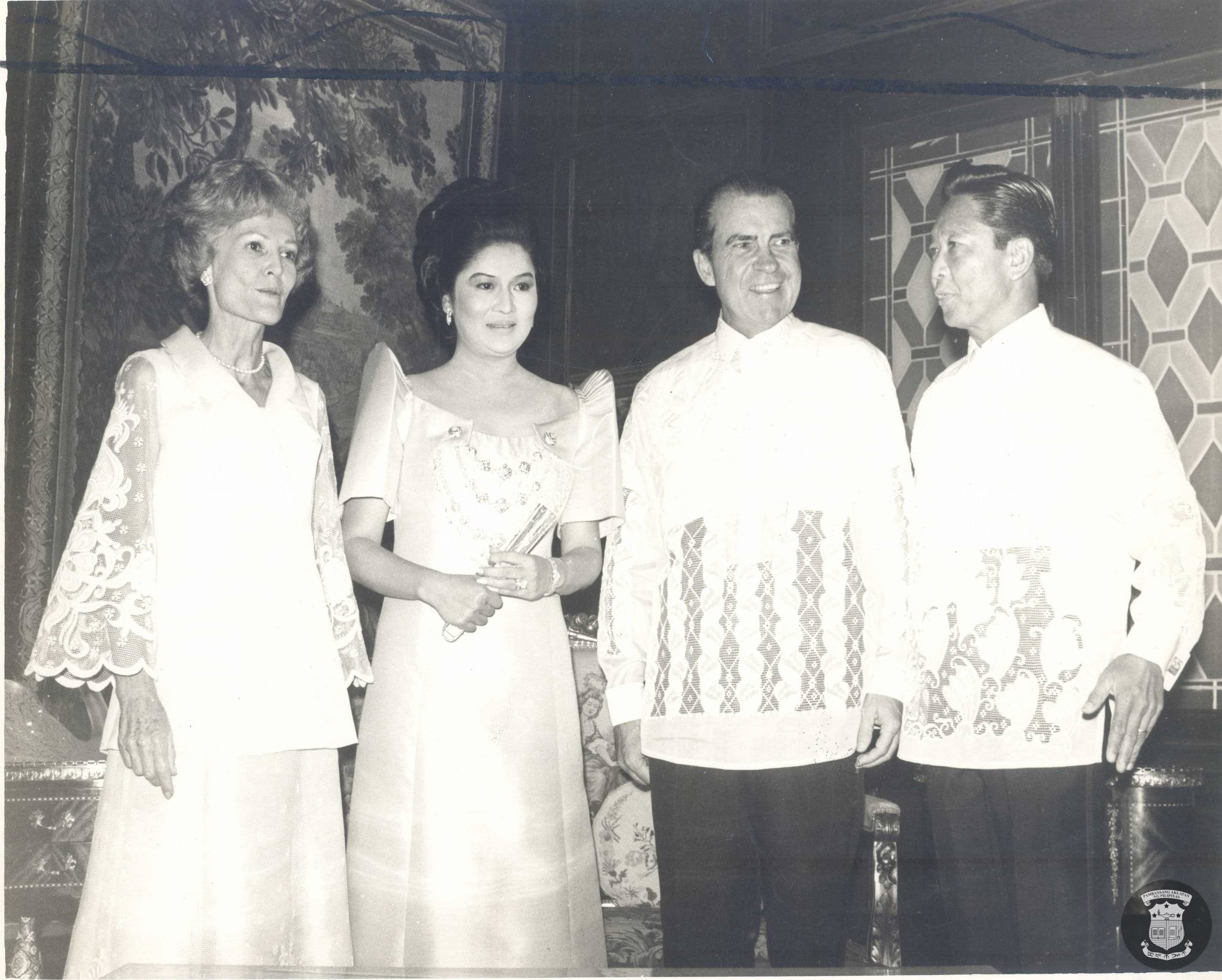
President Ferdinand Marcos with his wife Imelda, during a visit of US President Richard Nixon and his wife Pat in 1969, before the end of Marcos' first term.

The Philippine economy under Ferdinand Marcos faced its first major economic crisis over Marcos' use of foreign money to fund his fiscal deficit. Marcos launched US$50 million of infrastructure projects in 1969 to show progress to the electorate.

This borrowing caused a balance of payments crisis, compelling the government to seek to reschedule debt with the International Monetary Fund. The IMF mandated a stabilization plan including numerous macroeconomic interventions. These included a shift away from import substitution industrialization towards export-oriented industrialization; and allowing the peso to float and decline in value. Inflation surged.

== Second term (1969–1972) ==
The election was held on 11 November 1969 and Marcos won handily over his opponent Sergio Osmeña. The second term of the presidency of Ferdinand Marcos began in 1969. The balance of payments crisis quickly led to social unrest – so much so that Marcos went from a landslide victory in November 1969 to protesters burning his effigy in January 1970.

Despite the crisis, the administration continued its strategy of using foreign loans to fund infrastructure, encouraged by low interest rates in international capital markets.

=== Social unrest ===
The social impact came rapidly, demolishing Marcos’ popularity. By the time he gave his fifth State of the Nation Address on 26 January 1970, he was already beset by multi-sectoral protests that included the "radicals" of the left and the "moderates", civil libertarians and some religious leaders.

Marcos increasingly blamed this unrest on the still-new Communist Party of the Philippines, born the year before, after splitting from the dying Partido Komunista ng Pilipinas, and its armed wing, the New People’s Army (CPP-NPA). The Philippine National Security Council did not initially consider the CPP-NPA a major threat, but Marcos used it as a bogeyman, reminding Filipinos of the bloody Huk encounters of the 1950s, and courting the US Johnson administration's political support. Marcos’ attacks on the CPP led to its rapid growth in the early 1970s, leading Marcos to use the CPP as part of his rationalization for martial law in 1972.

=== Petrodollar-loan fueled spending ===
Despite the economic crisis, Marcos continued its strategy of loan-funded infrastructure and industrial projects aided by the flood of "petrodollars" in capital markets. Oil producing countries were eager to invest in countries they considered safe.

Philippine external debt was at $4.1 billion in 1975 and doubled to $8.2 billion two years later. Loans funded the 11 major industrial projects Marcos announced in his 1970 State of the Nation Address, as well as roads, bridges, dams, irrigation systems, communications infrastructure, power plants, and electrical transmission facilities.

By 1982, the Philippines’ debt had multiplied to $24.4 billion.

=== Buildup to martial law ===
Unrest continued throughout Marcos’ second term. Rumors proliferated that he would try to remain in power beyond the two term constitutional limit. Factory workers and transport groups protested against low wages and unfair labor practices. Students joined the protests.

The 1971 Philippine Constitutional Convention lent credence to beliefs that Marcos wanted to stay in power. Delegate Eduardo Quintero implicated Imelda Marcos in a payoff scheme for delegates who voted against the "Block Marcos" amendments which would prevent Marcos from running again.

When a political rally of the Liberal Party at Plaza Miranda was attacked with grenades, Marcos accused the CPP and suspended the writ of Habeas Corpus in a supposed bid to apprehend the assailants. Although the instigator of the attack remains the subject of historical debate, it prompted a series of protests by civil libertarians, led by Senator José W. Diokno of the Movement of Concerned Citizens for Civil Liberties, which continued until martial law was proclaimed.

The Plaza Miranda attack was followed by 20 more in Manila, causing significant property damage but only forty casualties. One assailant was arrested for these bombings – a bomb expert previously connected with the Philippine Constabulary.

The austerity package was supposed to be implemented during Marcos’ second term, but was delayed until the months prior to martial law. The first signs came with the creation of an export processing zones in Mariveles, Bataan and later, similar zones in Mactan, Baguio and Cavite. Marcos cracked down on labor protests, with the implementation of a "no-union, no-strike" policy.

== Martial law (1972–1981) ==
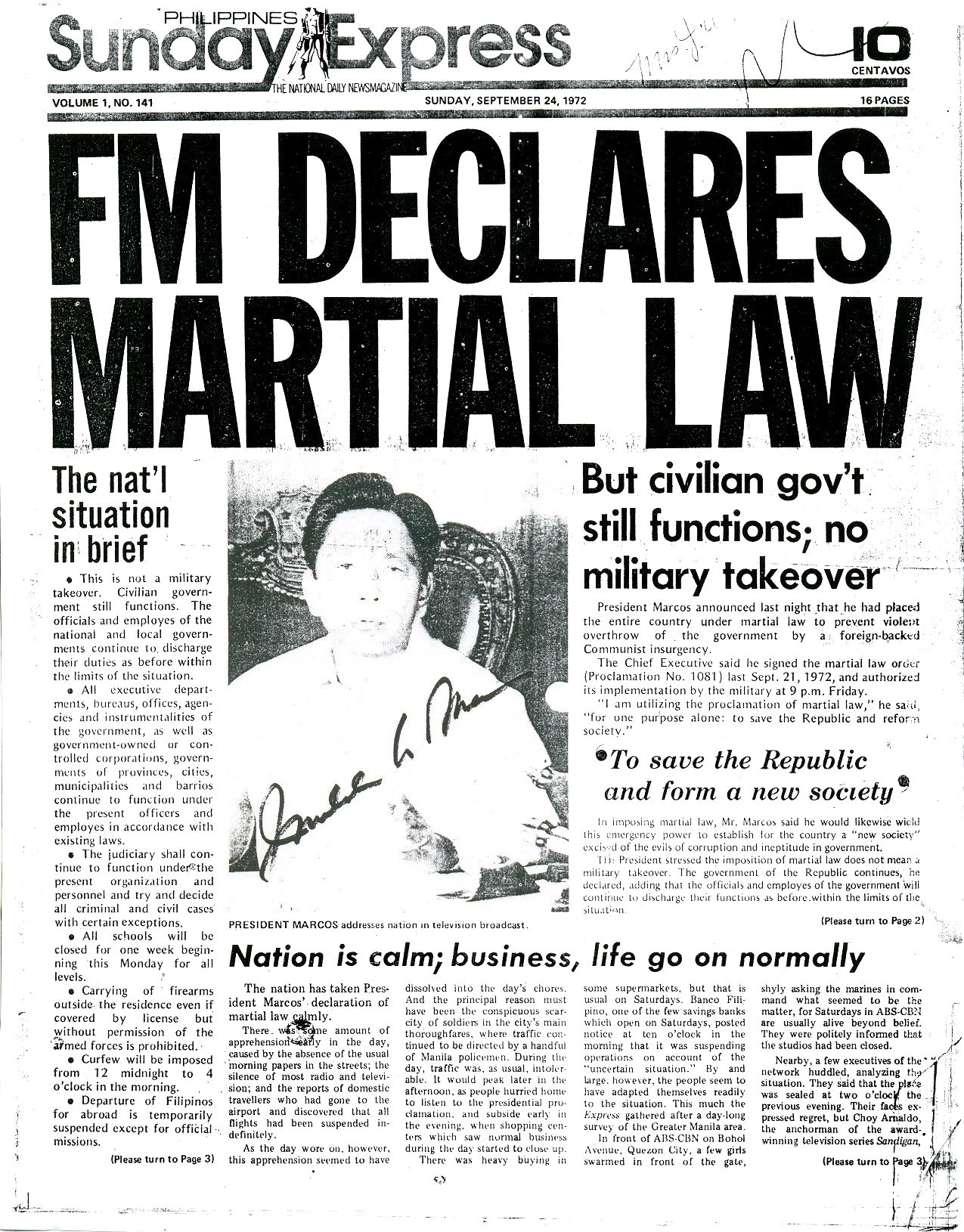
"FM Declares Martial Law"—the headline of 24 September 1972 Sunday issue of the Philippines Daily Express - the only newspaper allowed to circulate in the first few days after the declaration of Martial Law.

Marcos declared martial law in September 1972, positioned as a way of introducing stability. The business community mostly supported the move at first.

=== Proclamation ===
On 23 September 1972, Marcos declared martial law. The military rounded up journalists, political leaders, opposition figures, and some delegates to the constitutional convention – anyone who could challenge Marcos' control. Then Defense Secretary and later Minister Juan Ponce Enrile, who was in charge of the arrests, later recounted that they had to "emasculate the leaders" to achieve total control. Although he originally justified it on the basis of threats to the government, Marcos soon framed the declaration as an effort to create a "New Society", promising economic growth and increased acceptance by the business and international community.

Although security threats, some real and some faked, provided the rationale for declaring martial law, the justification for maintaining it quickly became the promise of higher economic growth and greater equality.

— Dohner and Intal

Martial law allowed Marcos to take control of firms such as Meralco, PLDT, and the three then-existing Philippine airline services. He also dominated media entities, including 7 television stations, 16 national daily newspapers, 11 weekly magazines, 66 community newspapers, and 292 radio stations.

=== Crony capitalism ===
Martial law gave Marcos extraordinary legislative and executive powers. He used it to expand his cronies' influence, who quickly established monopolies, in a strategy for economic control that came to be called "crony capitalism". Using presidential decrees and letters of instruction, he enabled Juan Ponce Enrile to control the logging industry, Danding Cojuangco to control the coconut industry, Roberto Benedicto to dominate the sugar industry, and Antonio Floirendo to control the banana farming industry.

=== Global commodities boom ===
The Philippines' exports income had begun growing in the early 1970s due to an increased global demand for raw materials, including coconut and sugar, and the increase in global market prices for these commodities coincided with the declaration of martial law, allowing GDP growth to peak at nearly 9 percent in the years immediately after the declaration – in 1973 and 1976. The Philippine economy took a big hit during the 1973 oil crisis, but the commodities boom kept the economy afloat.

Manufactured exports became a significant growth area, growing at twice the rate of the agricultural exports which had been the Philippines’ traditional export products. The Marcos administration continued its strategy of relying on international loans to fund the projects that would support the booming economy, prompting later economists to label this a period of "debt driven" growth.

Marcos’ infrastructure spending grew significantly. However, many projects did not produce economic returns. Some were not needed, while showcase projects did not address urgently need basic services. Another problem was the incompetence and/or corruption of Marcos' cronies who controlled many projects. Marcos’ immediate family was estimated to have accumulated "unexplained wealth" of US$10 billion. Corruption contributed to significant capital flight.

=== Crony capitalism, corruption, and capital flight ===
Many of the projects undertaken by the cronies did not produce economic returns, partly because of corruption, and partly because the cronies were selected primarily because of their loyalty to Marcos, rather than any kind of proven business acumen. In addition, some of these projects were simply not yet needed at the time, while some were showcase projects that did not address the more urgent need for basic primary services.

Marcos used government-owned financial institutions such as the Philippine National Bank to bail out many these crony-owned firms, compounding the country's economic difficulties.

The late 1970s also saw the rise of capital flight linked to corruption, as funds funneled from government projects were stashed in overseas bank accounts in Switzerland, the US, and the Netherlands Antilles among others. Marcos' immediate family – particularly Imelda, Imee, and Bongbong – would later be accused of participating in the plunder of the Philippine economy, with some estimates placing their "unexplained wealth" at US$10 billion.

=== 1979 oil crisis ===
The country was hit hard by the 1979 oil crisis. When the US Federal Reserve raised interest rates in the early 1980s, debt surged, hammering the economy by 1983. By the late 1970s the commodities boom slowed, and weakness in the Philippine economy under martial law became visible. The end of the petro-dollar glut led financing institutions to begin tightening credit, forcing the government to resort to short-term loans with higher interest rates to service debts and to import goods. In the third quarter of 1981, the Philippine economy followed the course of the US economy into recession.

The Philippines’ debt rose to more than 200 percent of exports from 1978 to 1991. More than half the value of the country’s exports went to debt service, rather than imports.

== Marcos ouster (1981–1986) ==
The economy went into decline in 1981. In the third quarter, the US economy went into recession, as the Reagan administration increased interest rates to slow inflation. Developing countries such as the Philippines were highly indebted, and the rate increase made debt service difficult.

The Kilusang Kabuhayan at Kaunlaran (Movement for Livelihood and Progress) started in September 1981. It aimed to promote economic development of the barangays by encouraging residents to engage in their own projects.

In 1981, Marcos issued Letter of Instructions No. 1107, directing the Philippines Central Bank to consider a credit bureau in the Philippines. Central Bank of the Philippines then organized the Credit Information Exchange System under the department of Loans and Credit. It was to engage in collating, developing and analyzing credit information. It aimed to smooth the exchange of credit data among its members and subscribers and to provide an impartial source of credit information. On April 14, 1982, Credit Information Bureau, Inc. (CIBI) was incorporated as a credit bureau to promote development and maintenance of efficient credit processes.

In an attempt to launch national economic recovery, Marcos negotiated with foreign creditors including the International Bank for Reconstruction and Development, World Bank, and the International Monetary Fund (IMF), for a debt restructuring. Marcos ordered a cut in government expenditures and used a portion of the savings to finance Sariling Sikap (Self-Reliance), a livelihood program he established in 1984.

Instead, the economy continued to shrink. Most government development programs failed to materialize. Funds were siphoned off by Marcos or his cronies. American investors were discouraged by the Filipino economic elite who disliked the corruption.

By 1982, the Philippines’ debt had reached $24.4 billion.

In 1984 and 1985 the Philippines saw the worst recession in its history: the economy contracted by 7.3% for two successive years. Data from the Philippine Statistics Authority for 1985 showed that poverty incidence in families was at 44.2%—4.3 percentage points higher than in 1991 during the presidency of Corazon Aquino.

Marcos' health markedly declined costing him the support of his cabinet, the Military, and some of his closest allies. He was finally ousted by the People Power Revolution in February 1986.

== See also ==
- Ferdinand Marcos
- Martial law under Ferdinand Marcos
- Human rights abuses of the Marcos dictatorship
- Military history of the Philippines during the Marcos dictatorship
