= Reserve Bank of Fiji =

Central bank of Fiji

Coordinates: 18.1396°S 178.4251°E

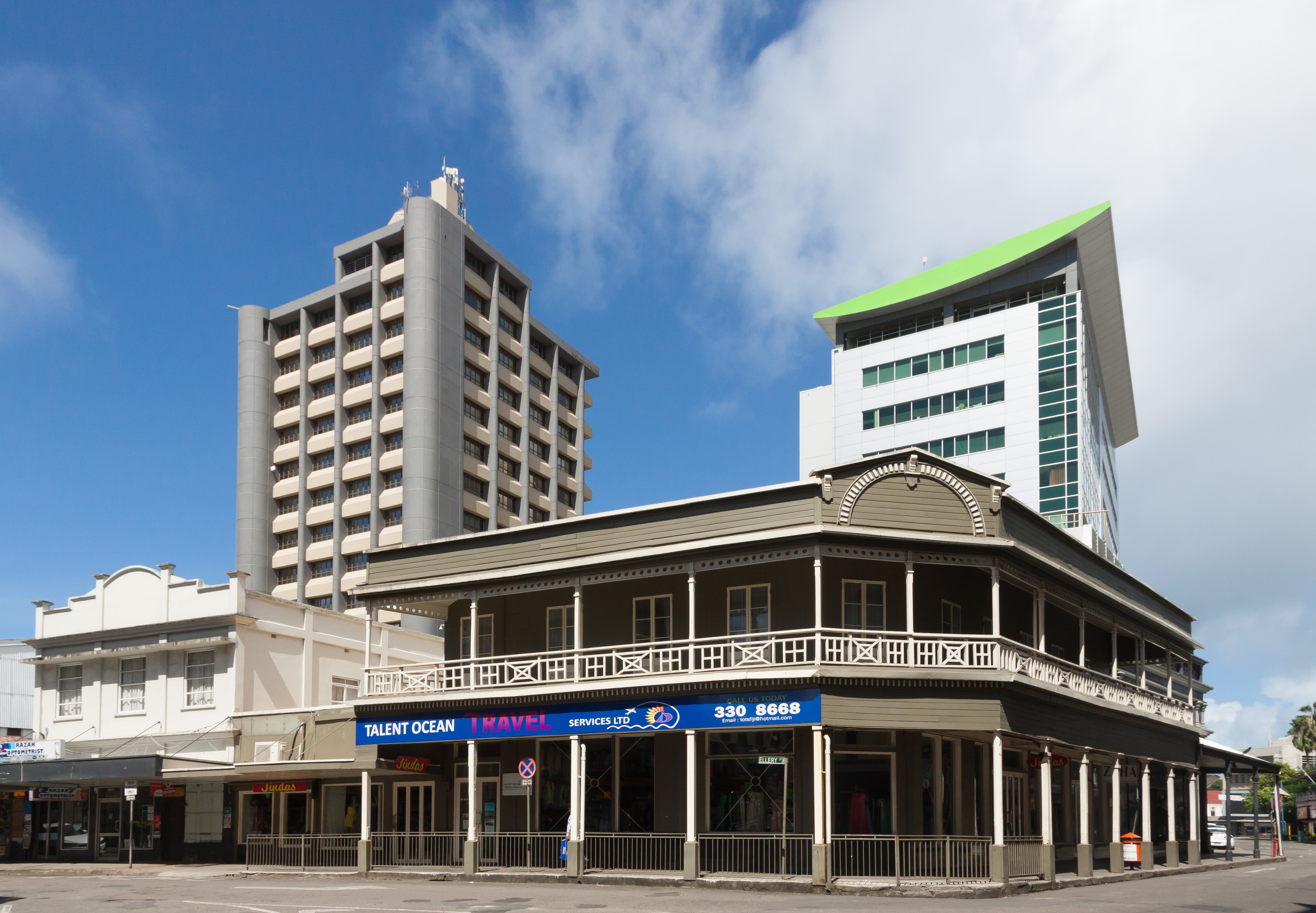
- Reserve Bank of Fiji (tall building on the left) in Suva
- Central bank of: Fiji
- Headquarters: Suva
- Established: 1 January 1984 (commenced operations)
- Ownership: 100% state ownership
- Governor: Faizul Ariff Ali
- Currency: Fijian dollar FJD (ISO 4217)
- Reserves: 820 million USD
- Preceded by: Central Monetary Authority of Fiji
- Website: www.rbf.gov.fj

The Reserve Bank of Fiji (RBF; Fijian: Maroroi Baqe ni Viti, Fiji Hindi: फिजी रिजर्व बैंक) is the central bank of the Pacific island country of Fiji. Its responsibilities include the issue of currency, control of the money supply, currency exchange, monetary stability, promotion of sound finances, and fostering economic development.

The Bank is the only institution that is permitted to issue Fijian dollars (FJD) and put them into circulation. It is also responsible for setting the overnight policy rate, the main policy or bank rate for Fiji.

== Background ==
In 1914, the colonial government established the Board of Commissioners of Currency of Fiji with the sole right to issue Fijian pound notes and coins in the then Colony of Fiji. Following independence from Britain in 1970, the Central Monetary Authority (CMA) was created in 1973 and took over the issuing of currency and further expanded responsibilities.

The CMA was tasked with regulating the issue, supply, availability and international exchange of the Fijian dollar (FJD); with promoting monetary stability and a sound financial structure; and fostering credit and exchange conditions for the economic development of Fiji. It also acted as a banker to the government. By the 1980s, the government of Fiji wanted to expand its role and the Bank of Fiji was created by the Reserve Bank of Fiji Act of 1983, replacing the CMA.

== Statutory responsibilities ==
The functions, powers, and responsibilities of the Bank were specified in the Reserve Bank of Fiji Act, 1983. The principal purposes of the Bank as stated in Part 2, Section 4, of the Reserve Bank Act were as follows:

- to regulate the issue of currency, and the supply, availability, and international exchange of money;
- to promote monetary stability;
- to promote a sound financial structure;
- to foster credit and exchange conditions conducive to the orderly and balanced economic development of the country.

In 2009, due to the 2008 financial crisis, amendments expanded the bank's responsibilities to include the regulation of the insurance industry, securities industry, and capital markets.

== Departments ==
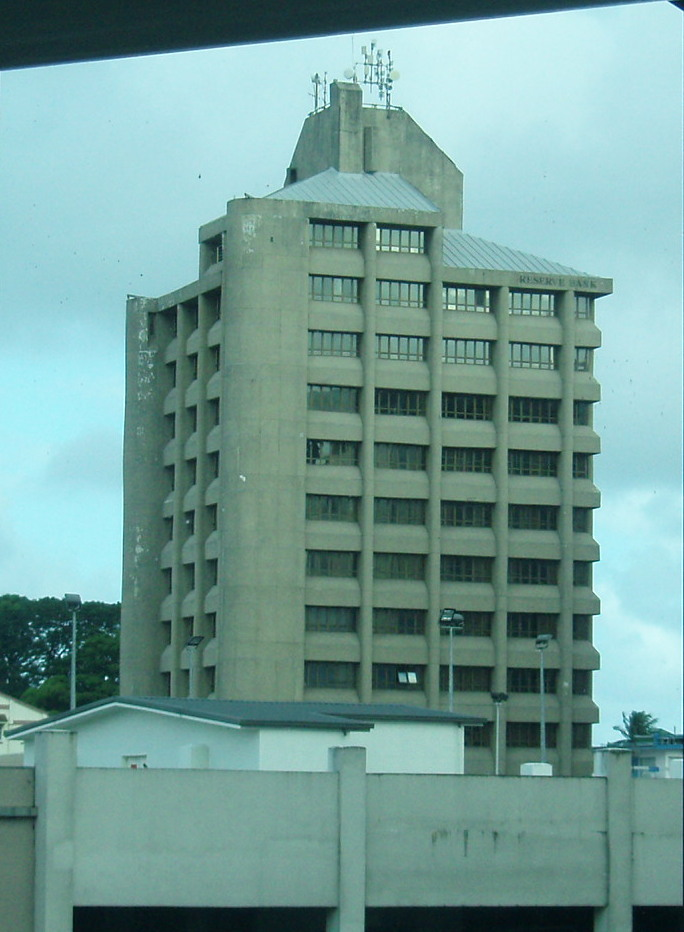
Reserve Bank of Fiji Headquarters

The Bank has four main departments: economics, financial markets, financial institutions, and currency and corporate services. The key roles of each department are as follows:

=== Economics ===
The Economics department's main responsibility is to conduct economic analysis and provide advice on the formulation of monetary policy. Some of the key tasks performed by the department are as follows:

- Monitoring economic and financial developments and providing advice on appropriate monetary policy settings in Fiji;
- Undertaking research and preparing economic forecasts;
- Writing and coordinating the Bank's publications; and
- Coordinating economic policy with relevant authorities.

=== Financial Markets ===
The Financial Markets department has the primary responsibility for implementing monetary policy, managing Fiji's foreign reserves, and providing banking services to the government. It also handles foreign exchange regulation and control as well as exchange rates. Its key functions include:

- Conducting open market operations to achieve operational monetary policy targets;
- Managing Fiji's foreign reserves;
- Maintaining appropriate exchange rate arrangements;
- Acting as a fiscal agent of the Fiji Government and registrar for debt instruments issued by the Fiji Government. This function has also been extended to a number of statutory corporations;
- Providing banking services to government and commercial banks; and
- Administering exchange controls to monitor and regulate capital flows through the banking system.

=== Financial Institutions ===
The Financial Institutions department's major objective is to maintain a sound market-based financial system through the supervision of licensed financial institutions and the insurance industry. Key areas of duties include:

- Regularly reviewing international developments in the area of financial system supervision and payment system structure and their impact on the supervisory arrangements in Fiji;
- Supervising licensed financial institutions and maintaining confidence by minimising detriments to the interests of depositors and policyholders;
- Processing applications for those wishing to become licensed banks, credit institutions, insurers, brokers, and agents; and
- Ensuring that prudential policies and guidelines are up to date and that licensed institutions conform to these standard requirements.

=== Currency and Corporate Services ===
The Currency and Corporate Services department has primary responsibility for currency issues and internal administration of the RBF, including financial reporting and human resources management. Its key areas of work include:

- Ensuring availability and supply of good quality currency;
- Ensuring that the Bank has a qualified and trained workforce to meet the output requirements;
- Providing support services to other departments in the Bank; and
- Ensuring that the financial accounts of the Bank are prepared in a timely manner.

=== Other activities ===
The RBF is also active in promoting financial inclusion policy and is a member of the Alliance for Financial Inclusion (AFI). It is also one of the original 17 regulatory institutions to make specific national commitments to financial inclusion under the Maya Declaration during the 2011 AFI Global Policy Forum.

== Reserve Bank of Fiji building ==
The Reserve Bank of Fiji Building is in Suva, Fiji. The fourteen-storey building was commissioned in the late 1970s and completed in 1984, at which time it was the tallest building in Fiji.

== Governors ==
The CMA's general managers (1973–1983) and RBF's governors (since 1983) are:

- 1973–1974: Ian Craik
- 1974–1977: R. J. A. Earland
- 1977–1980: H. J. Tomkins
- 1980–1988: Savenaca Siwatibau
- 1988–2000: Ratu Jone Kubuabola
- 2000–2009: Savenaca Narube
- 2009–2010: Sada Reddy
- 2010–2017: Barry Whiteside
- 2017–: Faizul Ariff Ali

== See also ==
- List of central banks
- List of financial supervisory authorities by country
