= The Maya Declaration =

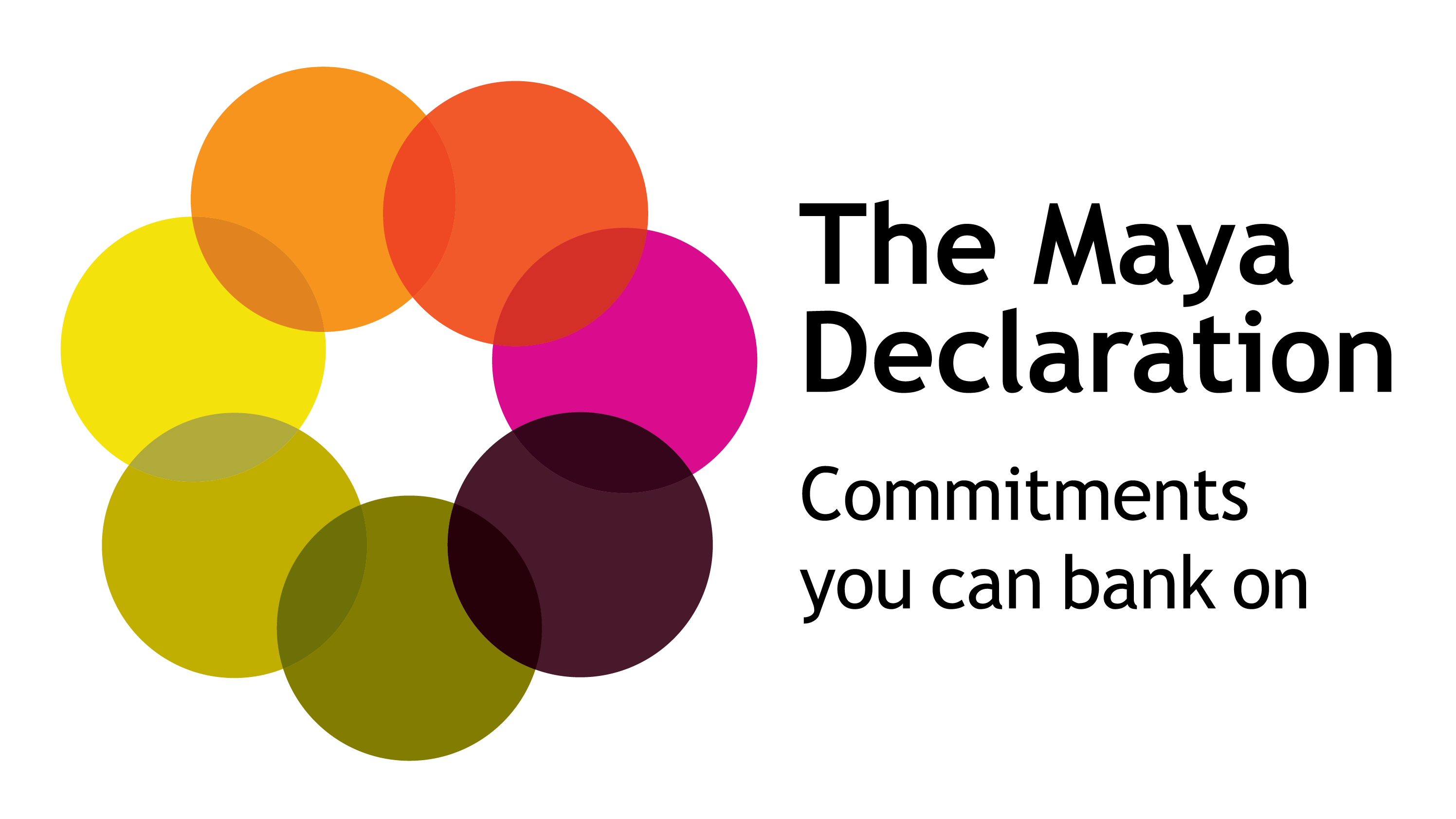
Maya Declaration logo

The Maya Declaration is a global initiative for responsible and sustainable financial inclusion issued by the Alliance for Financial Inclusion that aims to reduce poverty and ensure financial stability for the benefit of all. It is the first global and measurable set of financial inclusion commitments by developing and emerging economies.

The Maya Declaration is broad in nature, focusing on creating the right environment; implementing the correct framework; ensuring consumer protection measures are taken and using data to inform and track financial inclusion efforts. The declaration was made through AFI's network of financial institutions and, although no vote was taken, its common principles have been implicitly adopted by all the network's members.

== History ==
Since its launch at the 2011 Global Policy Forum (GPF) in Mexico, members of the Alliance for Financial Inclusion (AFI) have made concrete financial inclusion targets, continued to implement in-country policy improvements and regularly shared progress updates on the AFI Data Portal (ADP). The founding members were:

- Comisión Nacional Bancaria y de Valores
- Superintendencia de Banca, Seguros y AFP del Peru
- Reserve Bank of Fiji
- Bank of Tanzania
- Banque de la Republique du Burundi
- Banque Centrale de la Republique de Guinee
- Bank of Uganda
- Central Bank of Kenya
- Central Bank of Nigeria
- Reserve Bank of Malawi
- National Bank of Rwanda

=== Accords over the years ===
The Maya Declaration laid the groundwork for AFI members to develop and adopt a series of accords, action plans and statements that outline specific goals and target different aspects of financial inclusion over the years.

2013	Sasana Accord	Launched at the 2013 AFI GPF in Kuala Lumpur, the Sasana Accord states that financial inclusion policies and strategies will see evidence- and data-based results while also contributing to the accelerated progress and measurement of impact. This makes evidence-based financial inclusion policy a priority by collecting and analyzing comprehensive data, tracking the changing profile of financial inclusion and producing comparable indicators in the network.
2015	Maputo Accord	Launched at the 2015 AFI GPF in Maputo, Mozambique, the accord supports access to finance for SMEs to promote sustainable inclusive development and spur innovation. The accord followed on from Turkey's G20 Presidency, which made support for SMEs a key theme.
2016	Denarau Action Plan	Launched at the 2016 AFI GPF in Nadi, Fiji, the action plan focuses on gender and women's financial inclusion, identifying measures that AFI members can take to increase the number of women with access to quality and affordable financial services globally to close the financial inclusion gender gap.
2017	Sharm El Sheikh Accord	Launched at the 2017 AFI GPF in Sharm El Sheikh, Egypt, the accord recognizes the dual threats of financial exclusion and climate change as key barriers to financial stability.
2018	Sochi Accord	Launched at the 2018 AFI GPF in Sochi, Russia, the accord commits AFI members to developing regulatory or policy interventions that balance innovation in technology-based financial services with oversight.
2019	Kigali Statement	Launched at the 2019 GPF in Kigali, Rwanda, the statement aims to accelerate the financial inclusion of disadvantaged groups.
2020	Statement on Post-COVID-19 Recovery	Launched at the 5th AFI Annual General Meeting in 2020, the statement aims to enhance the network's commitment to restore the momentum and achieve financial inclusion goals through recovery policies following the COVID-19 global health pandemic.

=== A decade-long journey ===
As of 2021, 10 years after its launch, almost 80 percent of AFI member institutions have made a Maya Declaration commitment. The 73 countries with institutional commitments are represented by 82 institutions that have collectively made 885 targets into the ADP.

AFI members include roughly 101 central banks and other financial regulatory institutions from nearly 90 emerging and developing economies.

AFI is committed to supporting its members in fully achieving their commitments to contributing towards more inclusive development and poverty alleviation.

== Core values ==
The Maya Declaration is the first global and measurable set of commitments made by developing countries to increase financial inclusion. It is underpinned by three core values that have sustained the impact of the platform:

- Self-determination: Each institution sets its own targets in recognition of the fact that country circumstances vary and that there is no simple, off-the-shelf solution.
- Peer-to-peer knowledge exchange: Harness mutual sharing and collaboration within the network to leverage practical and innovative policy solutions that address financial inclusion challenges.
- International cooperation: Effective knowledge partnerships with policymakers and regulators from developed countries, multilateral corporations, research institutions, private sector and funders to enhancing inclusive finance

The Maya Declaration has paved the way for the development and implementation of various accords over the years. Each emphasizes a specific aspect of financial inclusion and corresponds to the needs of financial regulators and policymakers against the outlook of the financial sector.

== Full text of Maya Declaration ==
Maya Declaration on Financial Inclusion

We, the Members of the Alliance for Financial Inclusion, a network of central banks, supervisors and other financial regulatory authorities met in Riviera Maya, Mexico, 28 to 30 September 2011, on the occasion of the Third AFI Global Policy Forum,

Recognize the critical importance of financial inclusion to empowering and transforming the lives of all our people, especially the poor, its role in improving national and global financial stability and integrity and its essential contribution to strong and inclusive growth in developing and emerging market countries;

Reaffirm the value of peer-to-peer knowledge exchange and learning among financial regulators and policymakers for the design and implementation of innovative financial inclusion policy solutions relevant to the developing world;

Recall our efforts over the last two years to strengthen and expand the AFI network and to identify and explore high-priority areas for financial inclusion policy in the developing world through AFI’s working groups;

Commit as a network of developing and emerging market financial regulators and policymakers to:

1. Putting in place a financial inclusion policy that creates an enabling environment for costeffective access to financial services that makes full use of appropriate innovative technology and substantially lowers the unit cost of financial services;
2. Implementing a sound and proportional regulatory framework that achieves the complementary goals of financial inclusion, financial stability, and financial integrity;
3. Recognizing consumer protection and empowerment as key pillars of financial inclusion efforts to ensure that all people are included in their country’s financial sector;
4. Making evidence-based financial inclusion policy a priority by collecting and analyzing comprehensive data, tracking the changing profile of financial inclusion, and producing comparable indicators in the network.

We remain dedicated to making financial inclusion a reality through concerted domestic and global actions, and actively sharing our knowledge and experience through the AFI network. We commit to delivering concrete financial inclusion outcomes for the developing world to provide sustainable, relevant, cost-effective, and meaningful financial services for the world’s financially unserved populations.

— Members of the Alliance for Financial Inclusion

== Institutions with Maya Declaration commitments ==
#	Country	AFI member institution
1	Angola	Banco Nacional de Angola
2	Argentina	Banco Central de la República Argentina
3	Armenia	Central Bank of Armenia
4	The Bahamas	Central Bank of The Bahamas
5	Bangladesh	Bangladesh Bank
5	Bangladesh	Microcredit Regulatory Authority of Bangladesh
5	Bangladesh	Ministry of Finance Bangladesh
6	Belarus	National Bank of the Republic of Belarus
7	Bhutan	Royal Monetary Authority of Bhutan
8	Brazil	*Banco Central do Brasil
9	Burundi	Banque de la République du Burundi
10	Cambodia	National Bank of Cambodia
11	Chile	Ministerio de Desarrollo Social de Chile
12	China	People's Bank of China
12	China	China Banking Regulatory Commission
13	Colombia	*Ministerio de Hacienda y Crédito Público de Colombia
14	Congo, Democratic Republic of	Banque Centrale du Congo
15	Costa Rica	Superintendencia General de Entidades Financieras de Costa Rica
16	Côte d'Ivoire	Ministère de l’Economie et des Finances de la Côte d'Ivoire
17	Dominican Republic	Superintendencia de Bancos de la República Dominicana
18	Ecuador	*Banco Central del Ecuador
19	Egypt	Central Bank of Egypt
20	El Salvador	Banco Central de Reserva de El Salvador
21	Eswatini	Ministry of Finance of Eswatini
21	Eswatini	Central Bank of Eswatini
22	Ethiopia	National Bank of Ethiopia
23	Fiji	Reserve Bank of Fiji
24	The Gambia	Central Bank of the Gambia
25	Ghana	Bank of Ghana
26	Guatemala	*Superintendencia de Bancos de Guatemala
27	Guinea	Banque Centrale de la République de Guinée
28	Haiti	Banque de la République d’Haiti
29	Honduras	Comisión Nacional de Bancos y Seguros Honduras
30	Indonesia	*Bank Indonesia
31	Jordan	Central Bank of Jordan
32	Kenya	Central Bank of Kenya
33	Kyrgyz Republic	National Bank of the Kyrgyz Republic
34	Lesotho	Central Bank of Lesotho
35	Liberia	Central Bank of Liberia
36	Madagascar	Direction Générale du Trésor, Ministère des Finances et du Budget, Madagascar
37	Malawi	Reserve Bank of Malawi
38	Mauritania	Banque Centrale de Mauritanie
39	Malaysia	Bank Negara Malaysia
40	Mexico	Comisión Nacional Bancaria y de Valores
41	Mongolia	Financial Regulatory Commission of Mongolia
42	Morocco	Bank Al-Maghrib
43	Mozambique	Banco de Moçambique
44	Namibia	Bank of Namibia
45	Nepal	Nepal Rastra Bank
46	Nigeria	Central Bank of Nigeria
47	Pakistan	State Bank of Pakistan
48	Palestine	Palestine Monetary Authority
49	Panama	*Superintendencia de Bancos de Panamá
50	Papua New Guinea	Bank of Papua New Guinea
51	Paraguay	Banco Central del Paraguay
52	Peru	Superintendencia de Banca, Seguros y AFP del Perú
53	Philippines	Bangko Sentral ng Pilipinas
54	Russia	Central Bank of the Russian Federation
55	Rwanda	National Bank of Rwanda
56	Samoa	Central Bank of Samoa
57	São Tomé e Príncipe	Banco Central de São Tomé e Príncipe
58	Senegal	Ministère de l’Economie et des Finances du Sénégal
59	Seychelles	Central Bank of Seychelles
60	Sierra Leone	Bank of Sierra Leone
61	Solomon Islands	Central Bank of Solomon Islands
62	Suriname	Central Bank van Suriname
63	Tajikistan	National Bank of Tajikistan
64	Tanzania	Bank of Tanzania
65	Timor-Leste	Banco Central de Timor-Leste
66	Tonga	National Reserve Bank of Tonga
67	Trinidad and Tobago	Central Bank of Trinidad and Tobago
68	Uganda	Bank of Uganda
69	Uzbekistan	Central Bank of the Republic of Uzbekistan
70	Vanuatu	Reserve Bank of Vanuatu
71	West Africa	**Banque Centrale des Etats de l’Afrique de l’Ouest (BCEAO)
72	Zambia	Bank of Zambia
73	Zimbabwe	Reserve Bank of Zimbabwe

* Former AFI member institution that made a commitment while active in the network.

** BCEAO represents Benin, Burkina Faso, Guinea-Bissau, Côte d'Ivoire, Mali, Niger, Senegal and Togo.
