= Polylateral Development =

Polylateral Development or polylateralism (poly: meaning ‘many’, lateral: meaning ‘sides’) is an emerging trend in international development theory. Polylateral Development focuses on supporting systematic and sustainable lateral flows of knowledge and resources among and between developing countries to promote socio-economic growth and development.

The main feature of Polylateral Development, as opposed to more traditional bilateral or multilateral development, is the absence of any single agency or organization (IMF, World Bank, USAID etc.) in determining the direction that is taken by developing nations in regard to the creation of policy. It is a peer-to-peer development strategy, with participants choosing policy area focus based on their own needs, and then looking for guidance or lessons from others who may have experience in those same areas.

Key Polylateral Development Concepts:
- Peer-to-Peer interaction
- South-to-South focus
- Knowledge sharing community
- Recognition of diverse policy requirements (one size does not fit all)
- Participants look for guidance from the developing world, but adapt only what they need

A good example of Polylateral Development in action can be seen in the work of the Alliance for Financial Inclusion. AFI is a knowledge sharing network of developing nations focused on expanding access to the formal financial sector and has often been credited with coining the Polylateral Development term. (Although 'polylateralism' in relation to international relations was first used by Geoffrey Wiseman in his paper “Polylateralism” and New Modes of Global Dialogue in 2004) The members of the network are all from developing countries and join in order to learn lessons from other developing countries about different kinds of financial inclusion policy experiences, so as to improve or develop their own development efforts. Rather than having direction imposed upon them by international organizations or developed countries, the members of AFI determine their priorities and direction through consultation with other members (using forums, working groups and one to one meetings), and then develop policy based on the specific needs of their populations and the capacity of their countries.
