= Credit Information Corporation =

Philippine credit information system

- Korporasyong Impormasyon sa Kredito

Agency overview
- Formed: November 15, 2008
- Jurisdiction: Credit Registry
- Headquarters: Exchange Corner Building, Legaspi Village, Makati
- Agency executive: Ben Joshua A. Baltazar, President and CEO
- Parent agency: Department of Finance
- Website: cic.gov.ph

The Credit Information Corporation (CIC; Filipino: Korporasyong Impormasyon sa Kredito) is a government-owned and controlled corporation (GOCC) that operates a credit information system in the Philippines. It was established in 2008 through the Credit Information System Act (CISA) to develop a centralized and comprehensive system for collecting and disseminating accurate and fair information on credit and credit-related activities of entities participating in the financial system.

Credit information is collected from various sources, including banks, financial institutions, insurance companies, financing companies, credit cooperatives, utility companies, and other businesses that extend loans. The CIC compiles this information to help creditors assess borrowers' creditworthiness.

The credit information system is designed to address the need for reliable credit data on borrowers. It aims to improve the availability of credit, particularly for micro, small, and medium enterprises (MSMEs), make credit more cost-effective, and reduce reliance on collateral to secure credit facilities. An efficient credit information system also enables financial institutions to lower overall credit risk, contributing to a healthier and more stable financial system.

By law, credit information must be provided to all participants at minimal cost. The CIC is also mandated to protect consumer rights and uphold fair competition in the industry.

== Credit Information System Act ==
The Credit Information System Act of 2008 (Republic Act No. 9510), also known as CISA, is the act establishing Credit Information Corporation.

== Accredited Credit Bureaus ==
On March 13, 2016, the CIC announced the accreditation of the first four credit bureaus, three international firms and one national credit bureau.

- CIBI Information, Inc., also known as CIBI, formerly known as Credit Information Bureau, Inc., is the first credit bureau in the Philippines. In 1982, the CIBI started as a quasi-government body to initiate a credit information exchange system in the Philippines under the Central Bank of the Philippines, the Securities and Exchange Commission (SEC), and the Financial Executives Institute of the Philippines (FINEX). In 1997, Credit Information Bureau, Inc. was incorporated into a private entity and became CIBI Information, Inc. At present, CIBI is a provider of information and intelligence for business, credit and individuals. The company also supplies compliance reports before accrediting suppliers, industry partners and even hiring professionals. Marlo R. Cruz is the current President and CEO of CIBI.
- TransUnion Philippines is a local office of TransUnion that has partnered with banks in the Philippines in 2011.
- Compuscan Philippines was licensed in October 2015 as Compuscan Philippines Inc., a subsidiary of Compuscan, as a Special Accessing Entity (“SAE”). Compuscan Philippines Inc. currently operates from Manila, Philippines.
- CRIF of Italy was established in 1988 and it specializes in credit information systems, business information and credit management solutions.

== See also ==
- Credit bureau in the Philippines
