= Microjustice =

Legal services primarily for poor people and excluded groups

Microjustice is the general term for the provision of basic legal services on an individual level, primarily to poor people and excluded groups.

The provided legal assistance include that people, who ask for help, are assisted by obtaining the right legal documentation, such as birth certificates, house- and land registration papers and other sorts of civil documentation. With these papers, people can get access to education, healthcare, microfinance, social benefits and it gives people the opportunity to protect their property.

The concept of Microjustice is deduced from the concept of microfinance(inclusive finance). An example of an organisation who provides microjustice services is Microjustice4all.

== Services ==
Microjustice consists of a broad variety of services, such as the provision of legal documentation, awareness-raising activities, local capacity building and evidence-based lobbying. All these activities are intended to enable people to participate in society and encourage them to be self-reliant.
