= Philippine Rating Services Corporation =

- Formerly: CIBI Ratings
- Industry: rating agency
- Founded: 1982
- Headquarters: Makati, Philippines
- Website: philratings.com.ph

The Philippine Rating Services Corporation (PhilRatings) is a rating agency in the Philippines. PhilRatings provides credit ratings for bonds, commercial paper, banks and other financial institutions, local governments, project finance transactions and asset-backed securities.

It is an affiliate of Standard & Poor's.

PhilRatings has been assigning ratings since 1985.

== History ==
PhilRatings was founded as CIBI Ratings, part of the Credit Information Bureau, Inc., known as the CIBI Foundation, which was set up in 1982 by the Philippine Securities and Exchange Commission, Central Bank of the Philippines (now Bangko Sentral), and the Financial Executives Institute of the Philippines.

In 1998, PhilRatings became a separate company but remained a wholly owned subsidiary of the CIBI Foundation.
