= AFI Global Policy Forum =

Annual Alliance for Financial Inclusion event

The Global Policy Forum (GPF) is organized by the Alliance for Financial Inclusion, or AFI, as the keystone event for its membership and financial inclusion policymakers worldwide. Each year, it is co-hosted by a different member institution in a different region of the world. As of November 2023, AFI had 86 member institutions from over 80 countries, making the AFI GPF the most important and comprehensive forum for regulatory institutions with an interest in promoting financial inclusion policy. The AFI GPF is focused on developing and improving national financial inclusion strategies and policies and is used as a platform for senior financial regulators to exchange ideas as well as engage in peer-to-peer learning activities.

== Background ==
The AFI GPF has been recognized by leading international network of financial inclusion organizations and individuals as an important part of the global dialogue on financial inclusion. Participation at the AFI GPF has become part of the standard dialogue among leaders of regulatory institutions and is often harnessed to help resolve problems for the unbanked. In his opening remarks at the 10th AFI GPF in Sochi, Russia, Bangladesh Bank Governor Fazle Kabir said: "We have over the last decade been able to raise the voice of emerging economies on challenges of financial inclusion through AFI GPFs and other regional platforms. We have, throughout the journey, made commitments and endorsed accords that have been instrumental in addressing countries financial inclusion challenges, ranging from measurement of financial inclusion, financing SMEs, bridging the gender-gap, taming the tide of de-risking, addressing financial inclusion and climate change aspects."

Participation at the AFI GPF is by invitation only. Participants include senior representatives from members, partners, central banks and other financial regulatory institutions from emerging, developing and developed economies.

== Global Policy Forum History ==
=== 2009 AFI GPF in Nairobi, Kenya ===
The first AFI GPF was held in Kenya in 2009 and focused primarily on the promotion of the benefits of a knowledge exchange platform of peers. In his opening remarks, the governor of co-host Central Bank of Kenya, Prof. Njuguna Ndung'u, summarized the goal of the AFI GPF when he stated, "we will, over the next ten days, share experiences on smart financial inclusion policies that have worked elsewhere. We will thereafter adopt these policies to suit our respective countries as we work together to push forward the global financial access frontiers."

Highlighting the significance of the gathering, Bangko Sentral ng Pilipinas Deputy Governor Nestor A. Espenilla, Jr. called the forum a “momentous occasion as policymakers, regulators, strategic partners and other stakeholders from all over the developing world have come together with the shared goal of building an inclusive financial system”. A report on the AFI GPF is publicly available through the AFI website.

=== 2010 AFI GPF in Bali, Indonesia ===
The 2010 AFI GPF was held in Bali, Indonesia, by co-host Bank Indonesia and saw the financial inclusion concept recognized as a more formalized and an integral part of financial regulators' work. In his keynote address, President of the Republic of Indonesia, Dr. H. Susilo Bambang Yudhoyono urged the participants to "make this forum a bridge between our national, regional and global efforts. Let us collaborate and synergize our works to eradicate poverty through financial inclusion. I am convinced that we have just as much to share as we do to learn. We are looking forward to hearing your experiences from Asia, Africa and Latin America so we can be inspired by your ideas and make our own financial system stronger, more inclusive and innovative".

Beth Rhyne, the managing director at the Center for Financial Inclusion noted after the forum that "by bringing together this many policymakers interested in financial inclusion [to the AFI GPF], AFI creates a stronger voice for financial inclusion all around the world. Until now financial regulators have tended to place top priority on financial stability and have often perceived inclusion as a threat to stability. AFI’s work helps to get financial inclusion high on the agenda in a way that it has not been before".

=== 2011 AFI GPF in Riviera Maya, Mexico ===
The 2011 AFI GPF was held in Riviera Maya, Mexico, and saw the entire membership adopt the Maya Declaration, marking the first time that regulators have committed to a common set of principles and goals for financial inclusion policy. The event was co-hosted by Superintendencia de Banca, Seguros (SBS) y AFP de Peru and Comisión Nacional Bancaria y de Valores (CNBV) of Mexico. Seventeen participating members also made more specific national commitments toward financial inclusion progress under the basic principles of the Maya Declaration. The institutions making commitments represented a diverse range of large populations, such as Mexico and Peru, to smaller nations, such as Fiji and Solomon Islands. Over 300 participants from 80 financial regulatory institutions took part in 2011 AFI GPF, along with representatives from the World Bank, the United Nations, the Gates Foundation and other international organizations.

In his closing remarks, Mexico's President Felipe Calderón Hinojosa stated that "it is so important that we are all gathered here today, public officials, central bank presidents, ministers, secretaries, academics, specialists of over 70 countries, to reflect on the developments and challenges of financial inclusion. It is a key task, since, by opening the doors of credit, savings and insurance to more persons, we are giving more certainty to the present and we are broadening their capacity to build a better future. Financial inclusion is a means to reach greater social justice."

At the same ceremony, the United Nations Special Advocate for Inclusive Finance, Princess Maxima of the Netherlands, said that she was inspired to see that AFI GPF participants were at the forefront of innovations in policy, regulation and supervision, and now had an opportunity to lead developed country banking sectors in this field. A report on the AFI GPF has been published on the AFI website.

=== 2012 AFI GPF in Cape Town, South Africa ===
The annual AFI GPF was held in Cape Town, South Africa, on 26–28 September 2012, under the theme of “Making Financial Inclusion Real”. It was co-hosted by the South African Treasury.The forum brought together senior representatives from more than 80 developing and emerging nations’ regulatory institutions from across the globe, along with financial inclusion policy experts and practitioners from AFI's many partner institutions. The agenda covered technical discussions on the quality of financial access and usage and featured high-level debate and dialogue on both the potential and the real impact of financial inclusion on the lives of the world's unbanked.

It highlighted the progress made by the 24 AFI member institutions following their adoption of the Maya Declaration during the previous year's forum in Mexico.

On the final morning of the three-day forum, 19 member institutions announced new Maya Declaration Commitments to increase the overall number of institutional financial inclusion commitments to 35 — an impressive achievement that marked the one year anniversary of the Declaration's inception. A report on the AFI GPF is available for download in English and French through the AFI website.

=== 2013 AFI GPF in Kuala Lumpur, Malaysia ===
The 2013 AFI GPF was held on 10–12 September 2013 in Kuala Lumpur, Malaysia, under the overarching theme of “Driving Policies for Optimal Impact”. More than 400 senior policymakers, central bank governors, partners from international organizations and private sector leaders attended the event, which was co-hosted by Bank Negara Malaysia. The opening ceremony included a speech from the UN Secretary-General's Special Advocate for Inclusive Finance for Development Queen Máxima of the Netherlands and a prerecorded video message from Bill & Melinda Gates Foundation Co-Chair Bill Gates. The forum provided a platform to debate and examine policy strategies to optimize impact on development by enhancing the alignment of financial inclusion, financial stability and consumer protection objectives.

Among the outcomes was the AFI members agreeing to the Sasana Accord that strengthened the effectiveness of their Maya Declaration commitments through the adoption of systematic assessments that ensure quantifiable and measurable targets for financial inclusion. A report. on the AFI GPF is available for download in English, French and Spanish on the AFI website.

=== 2014 AFI GPF in Port of Spain, Trinidad and Tobago ===
The 6th annual AFI GPF was held in Port of Spain, Trinidad and Tobago, on 9–11 September 2014. Co-hosted by the Central Bank of Trinidad and Tobago, it was held under the theme of “Global Partnerships, National Goals, Empowering People”. A new focus on engagement with non-regulatory organizations was evident during this AFI GPF, most notably through the network's peer learning approach with the global standard setting bodies (SSBs), and with the introduction of a dialog platform with the private sector. The event also revealed the location of AFI's new headquarters in Kuala Lumpur, Malaysia. A report on the AFI GPF event is available through the AFI website.

=== 2015 AFI GPF in Maputo, Mozambique ===
Over 450 senior financial inclusion policymakers and regulators, along with leaders from international organizations and the private sector converged in Maputo, Mozambique, from 1–4 September for the 7th annual AFI GPF. Under the theme of “Inspiring Innovation to Advance Inclusion”, the forum was co-hosted by Banco de Moçambique and saw members unanimously adopt the Maputo Accord, which commits members to support access to finance for small and medium enterprises.

The opening ceremony included a welcome address by the president of Mozambique, Filipe Nyusi, who thanked participants for coming and noted that the presence of so many financial inclusion leaders in the city had “made Maputo the financial capital of the world”. The 2015 AFI GPF report is available for download on the AFI website.

=== 2016 AFI GPF in Nadi, Fiji ===
The 2016 AFI GPF was held in Nadi, Fiji, on 7–9 September. The theme was “Building the Pillars of Sustainable Inclusion”. The event, which was hosted by the Reserve Bank of Fiji saw the announcement of the Denarau Action Plan for Gender Inclusive Finance. It was the first AFI GPF to be held in the Pacific region.

A report on the event is available through the AFI website.

=== 2017 AFI GPF in Sharm El Sheikh, Egypt ===
The 2017 AFI GPF was held in Sharm El Sheikh, Egypt, marking the first time that the flagship event convened in the Arab region. Co-hosted by the Central Bank of Egypt, the AFI GPF was attended by over 700 delegates from some 93 countries consisting of financial sector regulators, policymakers, financial service providers, development partners and academics. Under the theme of “Exploring Diversity, Promoting Inclusion”, the forum highlighted innovative financial inclusions policies and activities from around the world. At the event, 96 percent of AFI members endorsed the Sharm El Sheikh Accord, which commits AFI members to work together and with partners to identify, understand and implement financial inclusion policy solutions that also have positive outcomes for the environment, focusing on communities that are most vulnerable to climate change. Through the accord, AFI members pledge to contribute to climate change adaptation and mitigation in their own jurisdictions and regions, but also to the attainment of Sustainable Development Goal 13 (to take urgent action to combat climate change and its impacts) at the global level.

On the first day of the AFI GPF, together with the Arab Monetary Fund (AFM) and the Deutsche Gesellschaft fur Internationale Zusammenarbeit (GIZ) GmbH, AFI agreed to establish the Financial Inclusion for the Arab Region Initiative (FIARI). FIARI aims to help accelerate conducive policies and actions for enhancing Arab societies’ access to financial services through an effective coordination mechanism and by supporting the implementation of national financial inclusion policies. The 2017 AFI GPF report is available through the AFI website.

AFI also announced its new regional office in Africa during the forum, which was officially opened in Abidjan, Côte d'Ivoire, in February 2019.

=== 2018 AFI GPF in Sochi, Russia ===
Co-hosted by the Bank of Russia, the 10th AFI GPF was held in Sochi, Russia, the first time that the event was held in Europe. During the event, AFI extended its global and policy reach with the launch of the Eastern Europe Central Asia Policy Initiative (ECAPI). ECAPI's founding members are: Central Bank of Armenia, National Bank of the Republic of Belarus, National Bank of Georgia, Financial Regulatory Commission of Mongolia, Bank of Russia, National Bank of Kazakhstan, National Bank of Tajikistan and Central Bank of Uzbekistan.

The AFI Membership Council unanimously endorsed the Sochi Accord, which encourages peer learning and progress on financial technology (FinTech) for financial inclusion, including the exchange of tested and transformative solutions to accelerate access and use of financial services. Speaking at the event, AFI Deputy Executive Director Norbert Mumba said that “the adoption of the Sochi Accord is extremely significant for AFI ... Traditional approaches need a complete relook so that we are able to deliver financial services efficiently and effectively”. A report on the AFI GPF is available through the AFI website.

=== 2019 AFI GPF in Kigali, Rwanda ===
The 2019 AFI GPF was held in Kigali, Rwanda, and co-hosted by the National Bank of Rwanda under the theme of “Using Technology for Inclusion of Women and Youth”. Over 700 global policymakers, regulatory institutions and development partners attended the event on September 11–13.
