= Alliance for Financial Inclusion =

Malaysia-headquartered policy network

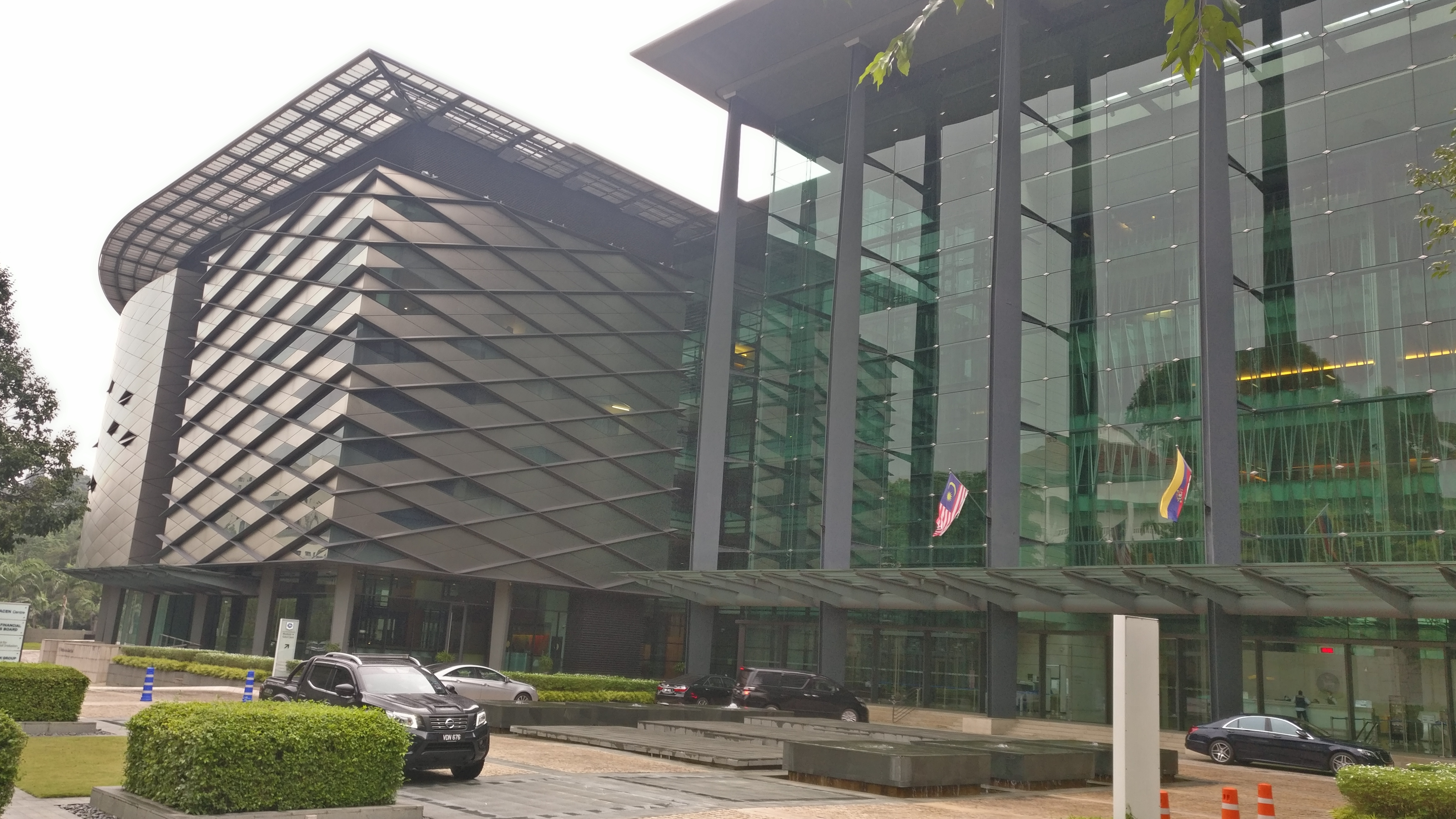
- AFI's HQ at Sasana Kijang, Kuala Lumpur
- Abbreviation: AFI
- Formation: January 1, 2008; 18 years ago
- Founders: Bangko Sentral ng Pilipinas, Bank Indonesia, Bank Indonesia, Bank of Thailand, Central Bank of Kenya, Comisión Nacional Bancaria y de Valores
- Type: An independent international organization constituted under the International Organizations (Privileges and Immunities) Act 1992 of the Laws of Malaysia since January 2016. Policy leadership alliance Peer-learning network Capacity building
- Purpose: Financial inclusion, Poverty reduction, Inclusive Green Finance, gender inclusive finance.
- Headquarters: Kuala Lumpur, Malaysia
- Location: Sasana Kijang, 2, Jalan Dato' Onn, 50480 Kuala Lumpur, Malaysia
- Region served: Worldwide
- Official language: English
- Executive Director: Dr. Alfred Hannig
- Staff: 50-100
- Website: www.afi-global.org

The Alliance for Financial Inclusion (AFI) is a policy leadership alliance owned and led by member central banks and financial regulatory in developing countries with the objective of advancing financial inclusion.

As of February 2025, AFI had 90 members from 83 countries developing and emerging economies, representing central banks, financial regulatory institutions, and financial inclusion policymakers. AFI partners with regulators in advanced economies, international organizations and private sector leaders to drive practical solutions and facilitate the implementation of impactful policy changes through its cooperative model that embeds peer learning, knowledge exchange and peer transformation.

AFI was founded on the idea that a global knowledge exchange platform was key to expanding and improving financial inclusion policies. AFI connects, encourages and enables policymakers to build capacity and develop policy initiatives in areas of financial technology (fintech), consumer protection, microfinance, SME finance, gender inclusive finance, inclusive green finance and other general financial inclusion initiatives in Africa, Asia, Caribbean, Eastern Europe and Caucasus, Latin America, Middle East and Pacific Islands. Each year, AFI holds its flagship event, Global Policy Forum (GPF), the world's largest financial inclusion gathering of policymakers.

AFI is headquartered in Kuala Lumpur, Malaysia, with regional offices in Africa and Latin America, and a representation office in Europe.

== History ==
=== Origins and until 2008 ===
In 2006, there was an emerging recognition that policies mattered when it came to financial inclusion. There is also a huge sentiment around the potential of digital financial services for increasing financial inclusion for the unbanked population of the world.

Dr. Hannig described the situation in 2006 as follows:

"There was a lot of international debate on financial system development and what the financial sector can do to alleviate poverty through microfinance. ... We were just starting to see the potential of digital financial services for increasing financial inclusion for the unbanked."

Through the Gates Foundation, Dr. Alfred Hannig and the Deutsche Gesellschaft für Internationale Zusammenarbeit (GIZ) team successfully received grants to kick-off the first phase of AFI in Bangkok, Thailand and subsequently launched it in Kenya in 2009.

=== 2009 to 2010 ===
Less than two years after its launch, AFI went from an initial founding core group of five member institutions to members in more than 60 countries, representing nearly 70 percent of the world's unbanked population.

In 2009, the network saw the first AFI Global Policy Forum, which was held in Nairobi, Kenya under the theme, A marketplace of ideas. Grants to selected member institutions were introduced.

In 2010, the Group of 20 (G20) nominated AFI as one of three implementing partners for the G20 Global Partnership for Financial Inclusion (GPFI). In this role, AFI brought policies for increasing access to financial services from developing countries to the wider G20 forum and facilitated the participation of non-G20 policymakers in developing and emerging economies participate in GPFI work.

=== 2011 Maya Declaration ===
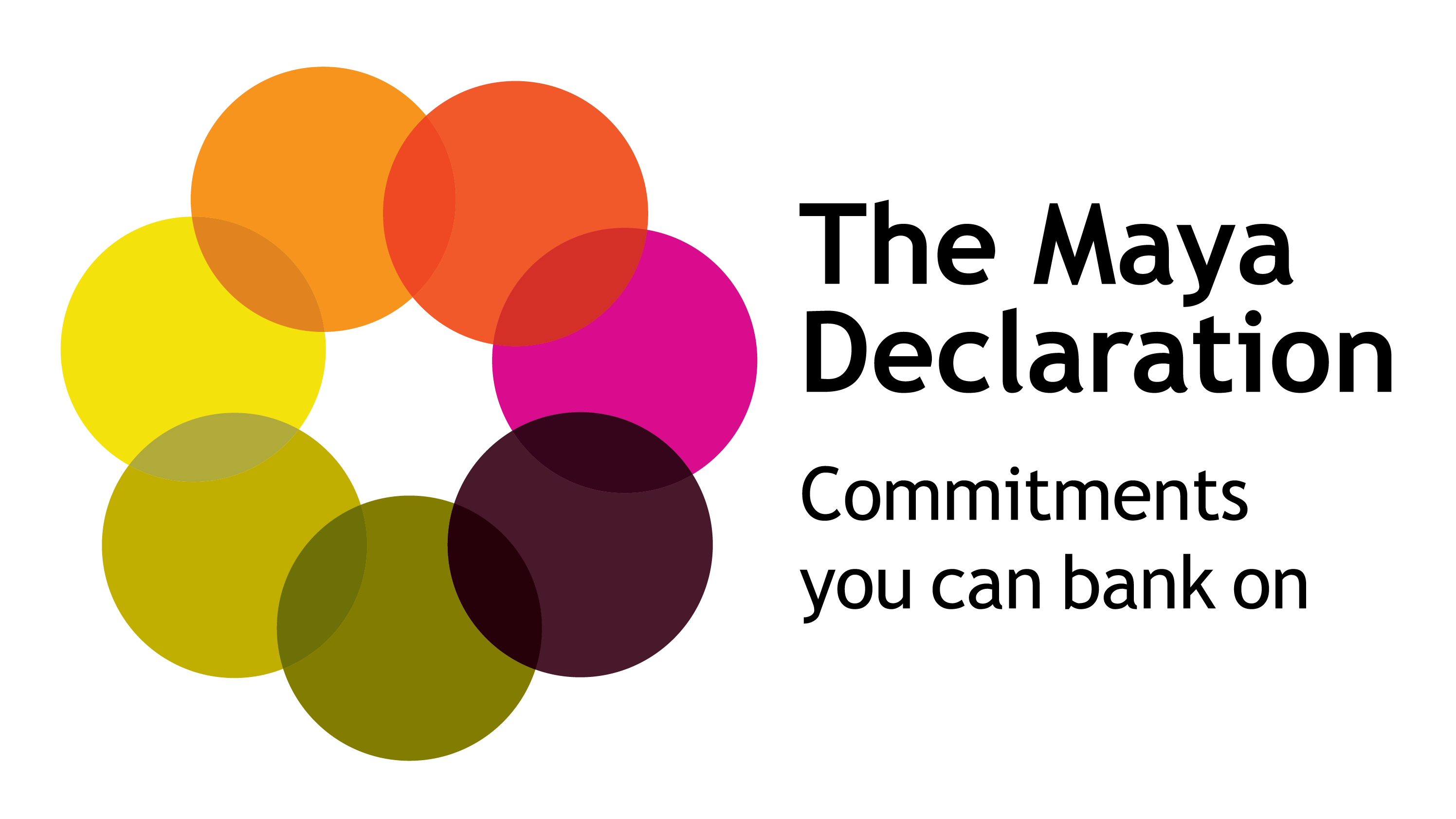

At the 2011 GPF in Mexico's Riviera Maya, AFI members collectively adopted the Maya Declaration, a global initiative for responsible and sustainable financial inclusion that aims to reduce poverty and ensure financial stability for the benefit of all. It is a statement of common principles regarding the development of financial inclusion policy.

More than 30 countries represented by AFI member institutions, went a step further by announcing specific and measurable commitments. As of October 2021, AFI member institutions have made a total of 885 Maya Declarations targets.

The Maya Declaration has paved the way for various other accords. In recognition of these developments, both the G20 and the Group of 24 (G24) highlighted the AFI learning model and the Maya Declaration as key steps toward global economic development, with the G20 urging its members to commit to the Maya Declaration.

=== 2013 to 2018 ===
In 2013, AFI members adopted the Sasana Accord on Evidence- and Data-based Results, Accelerated Progress and Measurement of Impact. During the same year, AFI reached 100 member institutions overall with the addition of the Central Bank of Trinidad and Tobago.

In 2015, AFI members endorsed the Maputo Accord, which commits members to support access to finance for small and medium enterprises. It also established its headquarters in Kuala Lumpur, Malaysia, which are hosted by Bank Negara Malaysia.

In 2016, AFI completed the final steps in its evolution from an exclusively donor-funded project into an independent and member-supported international network of policymakers. Members also endorsed the Denarau Action Plan for Gender Inclusive Finance to increase women's access to quality and affordable financial services globally — bridging the financial inclusion gender gap.

In 2017, AFI members adopted the Sharm El Sheikh Accord on Financial Inclusion, Climate Change and Green Finance.

In 2018, AFI set up its Africa Regional Office in Abidjan, Côte d'Ivoire, co-hosted by the country's Ministres de l'Économie et des Finances and Banque Centrale des États de l'Afrique de l'Ouest (BCEAO). That same year, AFI also celebrated its 10th anniversary at its GPF in Sochi, Russia. During the event, members endorsed the Sochi Accord on FinTech for Financial Inclusion.

In 2019, a letter of understanding was signed between AFI and the Ministry of Finance of the Grand Duchy of Luxembourg to launch a new multi-donor collaboration framework to bolster financial inclusion across the African continent. Minister Pierre Gramegna signed the multilateral letter of undertaking, together with AFI Executive Director Dr. Hannig. The cooperation is rooted in the support toward the advancement of the Sustainable Development Goals.

=== 2019 onwards: COVID-19 pandemic and AFI's response ===
The COVID-19 pandemic triggered widespread unemployment and falling levels of gross domestic product and disproportionately impacting the most disadvantaged segments of populations. This led to the implementation of AFI's COVID-19 Policy Response, which aimed to systematically deliver coordinated policy responses to help AFI members mitigate the impact of COVID-19 on financial inclusion policy implementation, especially for micro, small and medium enterprises (MSMEs), women, youth, forcibly displaced and other vulnerable segments of the population.

Virtual engagements were conducted during the lockdown period with technical teams and leadership across its member countries to address specific issues. A series of member needs surveys were distributed to enable AFI to deploy rapid policy response guidelines.

AFI partnered with the Mastercard Foundation to implement a two-year COVID-19 Policy Response program in Africa. The program targeted 49 financial sector regulators and policymaking institutions across the region to effectively respond to the economic consequences of the pandemic. In-country implementation activities were conducted specifically in Nigeria, Uganda, Rwanda, Senegal, Ghana and the BCEAO member jurisdictions.

Responding to global trends, Dr. Hannig described in 2021 a recent evolution in financial inclusion:

“Financial inclusion is no longer just about access to finance and bringing unreached groups into access to formal financial services. [It] is becoming more about maintaining high levels of safe and sound financial access, with increasing usage and quality of financial services … embracing important issues such as financial health and financial resilience, with the ultimate objective to ensure financial stability” – Dr. Alfred Hannig, AFI Executive Director

== Impact ==
Since 2009, AFI members have developed and implemented over 920 policy changes to enhance financial inclusion. 841 million people have been brought into formal financial systems as a result of AFI activities.

Since 2016, members have attributed over 100 policies and regulations to AFI annually, an indication that the preparatory work going back many years is beginning to be realized.

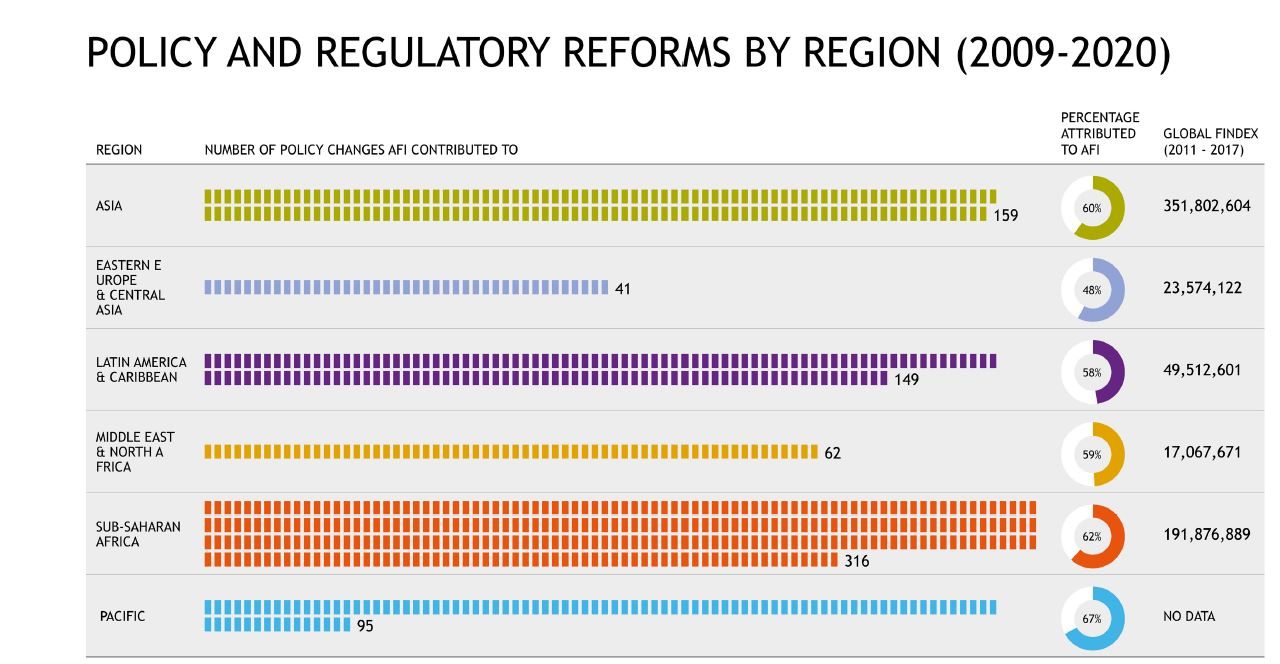

== Organization ==
AFI's core mission is to empower policymakers to increase the access and usage of quality financial services for the underserved through the formulation, implementation and global advocacy of sustainable and inclusive policies.

AFI is the only existing member-based organization with a strong network of central banks and other financial regulatory institutions, that have a specific focus or sole mandate on financial inclusion to support empowerment of the poor and aid the attainment of Sustainable Development Goals (SDGs) through smart policies and regulations~~.~~

It was founded in 2009 by Bangko Sentral ng Pilipinas, Bank Indonesia, Bank of Thailand, Central Bank of Kenya and Comisión Nacional Bancaria y de Valores in close collaboration and with support from the Bill & Melinda Gates Foundation and the Deutsche Gesellschaft für Internationale Zusammenarbeit GmbH (GIZ), AFI was established with the goal of advancing the development of financial inclusion policy in developing and emerging economies.

In 2016, AFI became an independent, member-owned and member-based globally operating international organization under Malaysian law.

AFI uses a peer-to-peer learning model to connect, encourage and enable financial policymakers to interact and exchange knowledge on policy initiatives. AFI has pioneered knowledge exchange platforms among policymakers and stakeholders worldwide to build a more comprehensive knowledge base of financial inclusion. This has led to the formulation and implementation of effective policies by members institutions within their home jurisdictions.

AFI also operates the AFI Data Portal (ADP), a unique and integrated global database on financial inclusion policies, regulations and outcomes. Housing information sourced directly from policymakers and regulators, the ADP empowers countries to share their financial inclusion stories and formulate policies through on data while also facilitating the study and understanding of trends in financial inclusion. The portal is accessible online and publicly available.

AFI administers financial inclusion policy-related services, including capacity building, developing-developed country dialogue, grants, in-country implementation support, knowledge products, regional initiatives and working groups, global advocacy on financial inclusion.

Since the first AFI GPF in 2009, the event has supported an environment of historic financial inclusion policy initiatives and declarations, including the Maya Declaration, the first global and measurable set of financial inclusion commitments by developing and emerging economies.

== AFI Cooperation model ==
AFI's cooperation model was designed to fulfil the objectives of supporting members’ financial inclusion agenda. Putting members in the driving seat of agenda setting for financial inclusion policy, AFI's unique cooperation model is based on the following principles:

- Effective governance with Board of Directors and management unit driven by values of transparency, accountability and flexibility
- Apolitical and non-bureaucratic
- Full ownership by members who lead and set the agenda for the network's initiatives including Working Groups, Regional Initiatives and capacity building
- Equality, inclusiveness and equity
- Solid administrative and financial system with resources focused on operational and financial sustainability
- Meaningful and binding partnerships with like-minded institutions
- Permanence and agility
- Sustainability of AFI services and knowledge resources

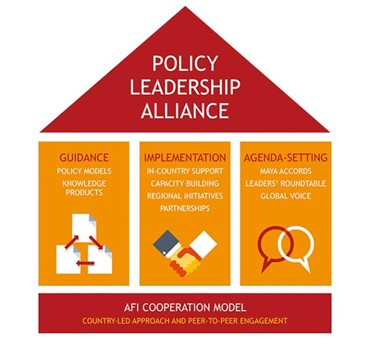

== Working groups ==
AFI has seven working groups. They serve as the technical backbone for generating knowledge, guiding and implementing policies, and developing policies. The working groups produce policy guidelines and tools for formulating financial inclusion policies, provide peer reviews, and contribute to the engagement of global standard-setting bodies (SSBs). They also all work on gender inclusive finance as a cross thematic area and have gender focal points.

Since the first meeting was held in 2010, working groups have grown rapidly in size and number. As of March 2022, 76 member institutions from 65 developing and emerging countries participate in working groups. They represent the leaders of financial inclusion policy and, together, have passed over 520 policy changes in their respective jurisdictions.

They also represent the thematic areas that AFI actively participates in:

- Consumer Empowerment and Market Conduct (CEMC)

Examines the importance of consumer empowerment and protection to improve the quality of financial services. CEMC Working Group also advances policy and regulatory issues related to consumer empowerment initiatives and market conduct regulations.

- Digital Financial Services (DFS)

Discusses issues related to digital financial services and promotes digital finance as a major catalyst in achieving financial inclusion in emerging and developing economies. The working group also develops policy guidelines, conducts peer reviews and engages the fintech industry and global SSBs.

- Financial Inclusion Data (FID)

Builds knowledge and good practices on areas related to financial inclusion measurements, such as indicators, methodologies, global standards and principles.

- Financial Inclusion Strategy (FIS)

Promotes the development, implementation, and monitory and evaluation of national financial inclusion strategies.

- Global Standards Proportionality (GSP)

Provides technical support on the proportionate application of global standards while supporting, exchanging and discussing measures that strengthen and balance both financial sector stability and integrity.

- Inclusive Green Finance (IGF)

Discusses and creates financial policies that build resilience to mitigate and adapt to the effects of climate change, and to facilitate a just transition towards a low carbon economy. The IGF since inception in 2019 has developed and launched 21 knowledge products, 22 peer reviews across several policy and implementation areas as at 2022.

Some of the knowledge products include:

1. Roadmap for IGF Implementation
2. Inclusive Green Finance: From Concept to Practice
3. Guideline notes on how to integrate IGF into a NFIS and DSS
4. Measuring IGF
5. Enabling IGF through DFS
6. Greening Credit Risk Guarantees.
- SME Finance (SMEF)

Promotes the discussion and implementation of smart policies that facilitate the access of MSMEs to finance and provides a platform for members to discuss related challenges and opportunities.

In addition, AFI working groups cover current and emerging global trends that have the potential for widespread impact. Member institutions have significant interest in developing policies that mitigate the challenges posed by the following policy areas:

- Forcibly displaced persons
- Gender inclusive finance
- Inclusive fintech
- Youth financial inclusion

== Regional Initiatives ==
Regional initiatives bring AFI closer to its members and strengthen regional cooperation in financial inclusion. They also enhance the network's ability to support its members working on specific regional priorities, sharing regional knowledge and translating global financial inclusion issues into practical implementation at the regional and national level. The network has five key regional initiatives:

=== African Financial Inclusion Policy Initiative (AfPI) ===
AfPI is the primary platform for AFI members in Africa to support and develop financial inclusion policies and regulatory frameworks, and to coordinate regional peer learning efforts. From AFI's regional office in Abidjan, Côte d'Ivoire, AfPI brings together high-level representatives from African financial policymaking and regulatory institutions to enhance the implementation of innovative financial inclusion policies across the continent.

Key AfPI initiatives include leaders’ roundtables, private-public dialogues, capacity building workshops, developed-developing country dialogues and meetings of its experts’ group on financial inclusion policy.

As of 2021, 39 AFI member institutions from 37 countries participate in AfPI. Together, they have implemented 251 policy changes that can be attributed to the regional initiative's work in financial inclusion. They have also published 15 knowledge products and 331 Maya Declaration commitments.

=== Eastern Europe & Central Asia Policy Initiative (ECAPI) ===
Launched at the 2018 AFI GPF in Sochi, Russia, ECAPI aims to resolve regional challenges and elevate the voice of Eastern European and Central Asian nations on key financial inclusion policy issues. Countries within the region require focused and tailored solutions to tackle its financial inclusion challenges, including low levels of financial literacy, high volume of remittances and underdeveloped consumer protection policies.

While the region has witnessed significant advancements in financial access in recent years, at least 121 million people remain excluded from formal banking. Through the activities implemented in ECAPI, members aim to:

- Increase access to financial services for the 50 percent unbanked youth.
- Address the regional six percent gender gap.
- Reduce the 25 percent gap in access between those with lower and higher levels of education.
- Focus on advancing financial inclusion for the poorest 40 percent of the population.

As of 2021, seven AFI member institutions in seven countries collaborate under ECAPI. They have implemented 29 policy changes linked to the regional initiative's work in financial inclusion, published four knowledge products and made 53 Maya Declaration commitments.

=== Financial Inclusion for the Arab Region Initiative (FIARI) ===
FIARI is a regional platform created amid growing demand from member institutions for tailored solutions to regional financial inclusion issues. Launched by the Arab Monetary Fund, GIZ and AFI in 2017, and later joined by the World Bank, it aims to enhance access to financial services in the Arab region through effective coordination mechanisms and supporting the implementation of national financial inclusion policies.

As of 2021, FIARI comprises 22 AMF member institutions, including eight AFI members. Within the AFI network, members’ contributions has led to the implementation of 34 policy changes and 74 Maya Declaration commitments in the Arab Region.

=== Financial Inclusion Initiative for Latin America and the Caribbean (FILAC) ===
FILAC is a regional initiative that aims to be the driving force for advancing financial inclusion in Latin American and Caribbean countries. It was launched in 2016 with support from Canada's International Development Research Center.

As of 2021, FIARI's 12 AFI members in 11 countries have implemented 99 policy changes and published 13 knowledge products. They have made 174 Maya Declaration commitments.

=== Pacific Islands Regional Initiative (PIRI) ===
The Pacific Islands Regional Initiative (PIRI) was officially launched in Dili, Timor-Leste, in 2015 as a regional platform dedicated to expanding financial inclusion across the Pacific. The initiative employs a model of south-south cooperation and peer learning, facilitating the exchange of policy expertise and best practices among member nations.

PIRI was established to address the significant challenges to financial access in the region, which include a highly dispersed geography, small, isolated populations, and underdeveloped banking infrastructure. Historically, these factors have contributed to some of the highest rates of unbanked populations globally. By fostering regional collaboration, PIRI seeks to overcome these systemic barriers and promote the integration of formal financial services for all Pacific Islanders.

The initiative encourages AFI member institutions to work toward expanding access to financial services across the region. Through PIRI, AFI has developed a model of south-south engagement and peer learning intended to broaden access to formal and informal financial services among low-income populations in the Pacific Islands.

As of 2021, the regional initiative comprised eight AFI members in eight countries. Their work has contributed to 65 policy changes and led to the publication of eight knowledge products. Members have made 66 Maya Declaration commitments.

=== South Asia Region Financial Inclusion Initiative (SARFII) ===
Launched at the 12th AFI Global Policy Forum in Jordan, in September 2022, SARFII aims to build on the important strides made by South Asian member institutions over the past decade by acting as a catalyst to accelerate financial inclusion with an objective to improve lives and make financial security and inclusion a reality for across South Asia.

== AFI Global Policy Forum ==
The AFI Global Policy Forum (GPF) is organized annually by AFI and is the keystone event for its membership and financial inclusion policymakers globally.

The first GPF was co-hosted by the Central Bank of Kenya in September 2009 in Nairobi, Kenya, and attracted nearly 100 central bankers and other financial policymakers, providing a platform for policymakers in developing countries to engage in dialogue and share knowledge and experiences in expanding access to financial services.

In his opening remarks, Central Bank of Kenya Governor Prof. Njuguna Ndung'u summarized the goal of the GPF when he stated: "We will, over the next three days, share experiences on smart financial inclusion policies that have worked elsewhere. We will thereafter adopt these policies to suit our respective countries as we work together to push forward the global financial access frontiers."

== Members ==
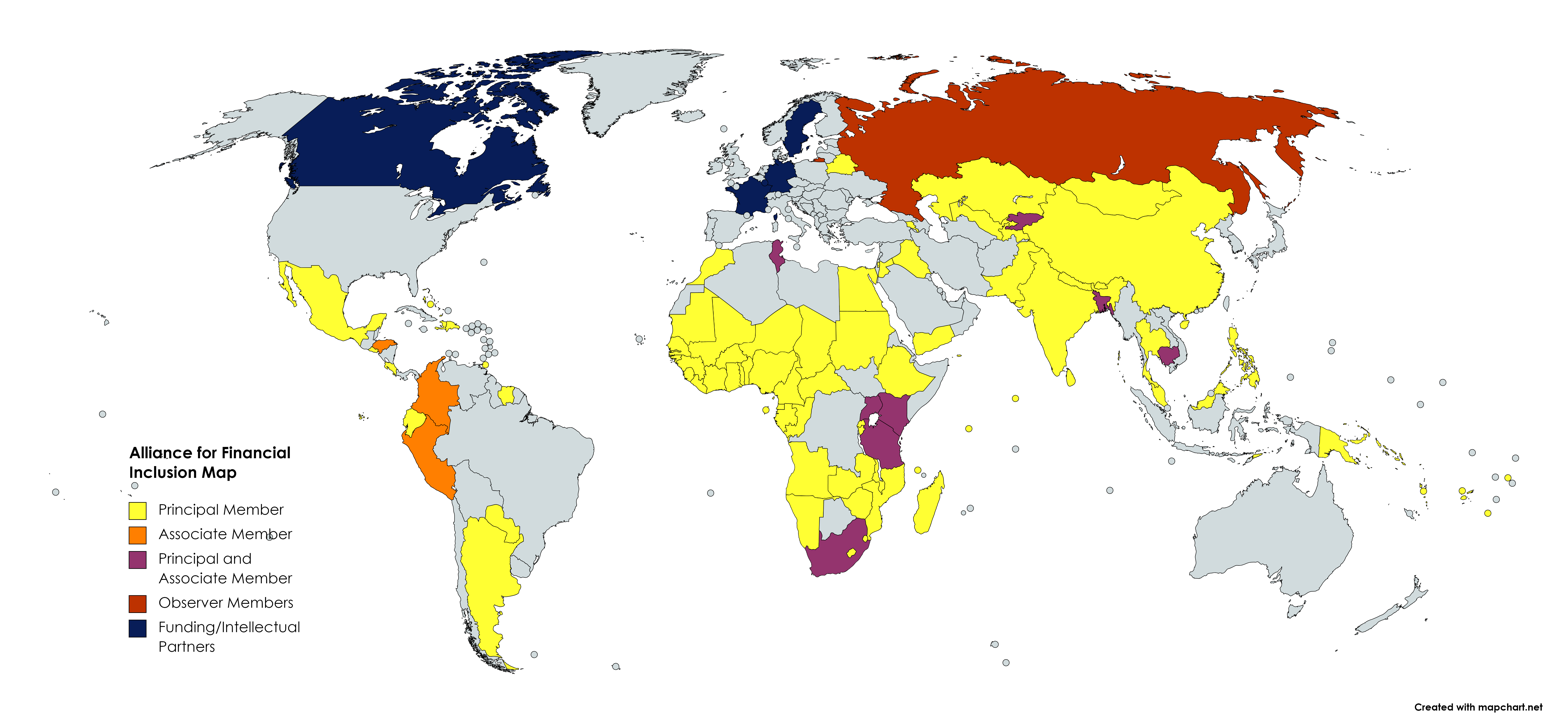
Alliance for Financial Inclusion Map

AFI's members consist of central banks, monetary authorities, and other financial institutions. AFI members are responsible for choosing the policies to focus on.

Principal and associate members
Country	Principal members	Associate members
Angola	Banco Nacional de Angola	
Armenia	Central Bank of Armenia	
Bahamas	Central Bank of The Bahamas	
Bangladesh	Bangladesh Bank; Microcredit Regulatory Authority	Insurance Development and Regulatory Authority of Bangladesh
Belarus	National Bank of the Republic of Belarus	
Bhutan	Royal Monetary Authority of Bhutan	
Burundi	Banque de la République du Burundi	
Cambodia	National Bank of Cambodia	
China	People's Bank of China	
Comoros	Banque Centrale des Comores	
Democratic Republic of Congo	Banque Centrale du Congo	
Costa Rica	Superintendencia General de Entidades Financieras de Costa Rica	
Côte d'Ivoire	Ministère des Finances et du Budget de la Côte d'Ivoire	
Dominican Republic	Superintendencia de Bancos de la República Dominicana	
Ecuador	Superintendencia de la Economía Popular y Solidaria de Ecuador	
Egypt	Central Bank of Egypt	
El Salvador	Banco Central de Reserva de El Salvador	
Ethiopia	National Bank of Ethiopia	
Eswatini	Ministry of Finance - Eswatini; Central Bank of Eswatini	
Fiji	Reserve Bank of Fiji	
Gambia	Central Bank of The Gambia	
Ghana	Bank of Ghana	
Guinea	Banque Centrale de la République de Guinée	
Haiti	Banque de la République d'Haiti	
Honduras	Comisión Nacional de Bancos y Seguros de Honduras	
Iraq	Central Bank of Iraq	
Jordan	Central Bank of Jordan	Jordan Payments and Clearing Company
Kazakhstan	Agency of the Republic of Kazakhstan for Regulation and Development of Financial Market	
Kenya	Central Bank of Kenya	Sacco Societies Regulatory Authority (SASRA) Kenya; Retirement Benefits Authority of Kenya
Lesotho	Central Bank of Lesotho	
Liberia	Central Bank of Liberia	
Madagascar	Banque Centrale de Madagascar; Direction Générale du Trésor, Ministère des Finances et du Budget	
Malawi	Reserve Bank of Malawi	
Malaysia	Bank Negara Malaysia	
Maldives	Maldives Monetary Authority	
Mauritania	Banque Centrale de Mauritanie	
Mexico	Comisión Nacional Bancaria y de Valores	
Mongolia	Financial Regulatory Commission of Mongolia	
Morocco	Bank Al-Maghrib	
Mozambique	Banco de Moçambique	
Namibia	Bank of Namibia	
Nepal	Nepal Rastra Bank	
Niger	Ministère des Finances de la République du Niger	
Nigeria	Central Bank of Nigeria	
Pakistan	State Bank of Pakistan	
Palestine	Palestine Monetary Authority	
Papua New Guinea	Bank of Papua New Guinea	
Paraguay	Banco Central del Paraguay	
Peru		Superintendencia de Banca, Seguros y AFP del Perú
Philippines	Bangko Sentral ng Pilipinas	
Rwanda	National Bank of Rwanda	
Samoa	Central Bank of Samoa	
São Tomé and Príncipe	Banco Central de São Tomé e Príncipe	
Senegal	Ministère de l'Economie, des Finances et du Budget du Sénégal	Délégation Générale à l'Entreprenariat Rapide des Femmes et des Jeunes
Seychelles	Central Bank of Seychelles	
Sierra Leone	Bank of Sierra Leone	
Solomon Islands	Central Bank of Solomon Islands	
South Africa		South African Reserve Bank
Sri Lanka	Central Bank of Sri Lanka	
Sudan	Central Bank of Sudan	
Suriname	Centrale Bank van Suriname	
Tajikistan	National Bank of Tajikistan	
Tanzania	Bank of Tanzania	
Thailand	Bank of Thailand	
Timor-Leste	Banco Central de Timor-Leste	
Togo	Ministère de l'Economie et des Finances du Togo	
Tonga	National Reserve Bank of Tonga	
Trinidad & Tobago	Central Bank of Trinidad and Tobago	
Tunisia	Banque Centrale de Tunisie; Ministère des Finances de la République Tunisienne	Autorité de Contrôle de la Microfinance de la République Tunisienne
Uganda	Bank of Uganda	
Uzbekistan	Central Bank of the Republic of Uzbekistan	
Vanuatu	Reserve Bank of Vanuatu	
Zambia	Bank of Zambia; Ministry of Finance and National Planning	
Zimbabwe	Reserve Bank of Zimbabwe; Ministry of Finance and Economic Development	

Region	Principal member	Associate member	Observer member
Central African States (Republic of the Congo, Cameroun, Gabon, Equatorial Guinea, Central African Republic, Chad)	La Commission Bancaire de Afrique Centrale		
West African States - Union Monétaire de l'Afrique de l'Ouest (Bénin, Burkina Faso, Côte d'Ivoire, Guinea Buisseau, Mali, Niger, Senegal, Togo)	Banque Centrale des Etats de l'Afrique de l'Ouest		

== Donors and partners ==
In 2016, AFI completed its transition from being an exclusively donor-funded project into an independent and member-supported international network of policymakers. However, AFI still continued to form strategic collaborations with a variety of global donors and partners from both the public and private sectors. These include:

- French Development Agency (AFD)
- German Federal Ministry of the Environment, Nature Conservation and Nuclear Safety (BMU)
- German Federal Ministry of Economic Cooperation and Development (BMZ)
- Swedish International Development Agency (Sida)
- UK Foreign, Commonwealth & Development Office
- Luxembourg's Ministry of Finance
- Luxembourg Ministry of Foreign and European Affairs
- Bill & Melinda Gates Foundation
- Flourish, part of the Omidyar Network
- Mastercard Foundation

== See also ==
- Maya Declaration
- Global Policy Forum (GPF)
- Financial Inclusion
- Polylateral Development
