= Credit bureaus in the Philippines =

Credit bureaus in the Philippines are credit bureaus that are licensed and accredited by the Philippine governments department of Credit Information Corporation (CIC) to operate within the Philippines.

== History ==
In 2016, the Credit Information Corporation or CIC announced the first six credit bureaus in the Philippines in 13 March 2016. The accredited credit bureaus consist of five international firms and one local credit bureau.

At that time CIC President Jaime Garchitorena said bureaus could start operations as soon as they become incorporated. The complete and substantial collection of credit data were planned to be ready by the end of 2016 or early 2017.

== Accredited bureaus ==
As of 2018, the following bureaus were accredited:

=== Local firms ===
- CIBI Information Also known as CIBI, formerly known as Credit Information Bureau, Inc., was the first credit bureau in the Philippines. CIBI started as a quasi government body under the Central Bank of the Philippines to initiate a credit information exchange system in the Philippines. In 1982, CIBI was founded and established by Presidential decree 1941 and was created under the Central Bank of the Philippines, now Bangko Sentral ng Pilipinas (BSP); the Securities and Exchange Commission (SEC) and the Financial Executives Institute of the Philippines (FINEX). In 1997, Credit Information Bureau, Inc. was incorporated into a private entity and became CIBI Information, Inc. At present, CIBI is a provider of information and intelligence for business, credit and individuals. The company also supplies compliance reports before accrediting suppliers, industry partners and even hiring professionals. Marlo R. Cruz is the current President and CEO of CIBI.

=== International firms ===
- TransUnion Philippines- A local office of a Chicago-based firm which partnered with banks in the Philippines in 2011.
- Compuscan Philippines: In October 2015, Compuscan Philippines Inc., a subsidiary of Compuscan, opened in Manila, Philippines, where the Credit Information Corporation (CIC) licensed Compuscan as a Special Accessing Entity (“SAE”).
- CRIF of Italy
