= National debt of the Philippines =

The national debt of the Philippines is the total debt, or unpaid borrowed funds, carried by the national government of the Philippines. As of the end of October 2024, the total national debt of the Philippines amounts to ₱15.1889 trillion ($273.9 billion).

- Total outstanding debt: ▲ ₱16.02 trillion ($276.27 billion) (61.3% of GDP) (October 2024)
  ∟Domestic debt: ▲ ₱10.89 trillion ($187.80 billion) (41.6% of GDP) (October 2024)
  ∟External debt: ▲ ₱5.13 trillion ($88.47 billion) (19.6% of GDP) (October 2024)
- Gross external debt:▲$111.3 billion (27.5% of GDP) (F.Y. 2021-22)

== General Government Debt ==
General Government Debt of the Philippines in billions of pesos
Fiscal year	Domestic	Foreign	National Government Debt	General Government Debt	% of GDP	GDP
2005	2,164.3	1,723.9	3,888.2	3,359.5	56.8%	5,917.3
2006	▼2,154.1	▼1,697.4	▼3,851.5	▼3,230.0	▼49.3%	▲6,550.4
2007	▲2,201.2	▼1,511.3	▼3,712.5	▼3,044.2	▼42.3%	▲7,198.2
2008	▲2,414.4	▲1,806.5	▲4,220.9	▲3,406.5	▼49.3%	▲8,050.2
2009	▲2,470.0	▲1,926.6	▲4,396.6	▲3,555.7	▼42.4%	▲8,390.4
2010	▲2,718.2	▲2,000.0	▲4,718.2	▲3,854.7	▼41.0%	▲9,399.5
2011	▲2,873.4	▲2,077.8	▲4,951.2	▲4,020.4	▼39.6%	▲10,144.7
2012	▲3,468.4	▼1,968.7	▲5,437.1	▲4,288.7	▼38.8%	▲11,060.6
2013	▲3,733.4	▼1,947.7	▲5,681.2	▲5,012.0	▼37.6%	▲12,050.6
2014	▲3,820.6	▼1,914.6	▲5,735.2	▲5,099.3	▼34.8%	▲13,206.8
2015	▲3,884.4	▲2,070.2	▲5,954.5	▲5,338.2	▼34.6%	▲13,994.2
2016	▲3,934.1	▲2,156.2	▲6,090.3	▲5,547.8	▼33.2%	▲15,132.4
2017	▲4,441.3	▲2,211.2	▲6,652.4	▲6,221.4	▲34.9%	▲16,556.7
2018	▲4,776.9	▲2,515.6	▲7,292.5	▲6,887.3	▼34.4%	▲18,265.2
2019	▲5,128.0	▲2,604.0	▲7,731.3	▲7,227.7	▲39.6%	▲19,516.4
2020	▲7,077.0	▲2,950.0	▲9,795.0	▲9,269.2	▲53.9%	▼17,937.6
2021	▲8,170.4	▲3,558.1	▲11,728.5	▲11,167.6	▲58.1%	▲19,390
2022	▲9,208.4	▲4,210.5	▲13,418.9	▲12,887.9	▲60.9%	▲22,023
2023	▲9,700.0	▲4,450.0	▲14,150.0		▼58.3%	▲24,276
2024	▲10,930.0	▲5,120.0	▲16,050.0		▲60.7%	
