= Financial inclusion =

Opportunities to access financial services

Financial inclusion is the availability and equality of opportunities to access financial services. It refers to processes by which individuals and businesses can access appropriate, affordable, and timely financial products and services—which include banking, loan, equity, and insurance products. It provides paths to enhance inclusiveness in economic growth by enabling the unbanked population to access the means for savings, investment, and insurance towards improving household income and reducing income inequality.

Financial-inclusion efforts typically target those who are unbanked or underbanked, and then direct sustainable financial services to them. Providing financial inclusion entails going beyond merely opening a bank account. Banked individuals can be excluded from other financial services. Having more-inclusive financial systems has been linked to stronger and more sustainable economic growth and development, thus achieving financial inclusion has become a priority for many countries across the globe.

According to the World Bank's Global Findex 2025, 79 percent of adults worldwide had an account at a financial institution or mobile-money provider in 2024, while about 1.3 billion adults remained unbanked. Among the unbanked, a significant number are women and poor people in rural areas. Often, those excluded from financial institutions face discrimination or belong to vulnerable or marginalized populations.

Due to the lack of financial infrastructure and financial services, many underserved and low-income communities suffer. Specifically, the lack of proper information can harm low-income communities and expose them to financial risks. For instance, payday loans target low-income persons who are not adequately informed about interest rates or compound interest. Such people may become trapped and indebted to predatory institutions.

The public sector spearheads outreach and education for adults to receive free financial services such as education, tax preparation, and welfare assistance. Non-profit organizations dedicate themselves to serving underprivileged communities through private resources and state funding. Within California, state legislation allows for grants to be disbursed during the fiscal year and nonprofits can apply for additional funding.

While not all individuals need or want financial services, financial inclusion aims to remove all barriers, both supply-side and demand-side. Supply-side barriers stem from financial institutions themselves. They often indicate poor financial infrastructure and include a lack of nearby financial institutions, high costs to open accounts, or documentation requirements. Demand-side barriers refer to aspects of the individual seeking financial services and include poor financial literacy, lack of financial capability, or cultural or religious beliefs (such as suspicion of loan sharks or rejection of usury) that impact financial decisions.

Some experts express skepticism about the effectiveness of financial-inclusion initiatives. Research on microfinance initiatives indicates that wide availability of credit for micro-entrepreneurs can produce informal inter-mediation, an unintended form of entrepreneurship.

== History ==
The term "financial inclusion" has gained importance since the early 2000s as a result of identifying financial exclusion and it is directly correlated to poverty, according to the World Bank.

According to FINCA International "financial exclusion" is the lack of access to basic financial services, such as bank accounts, loans, savings, credit and digital payments, often due to poverty, location, limited documentation or inability to meet banking requirements. It restricts people’s ability to save, borrow, invest, run businesses and improve their economic security.

The United Nations defines the goals of financial inclusion as follows:

- Access at a reasonable cost for all households to a full range of financial services, including savings or deposit services, payment and transfer services, credit, and insurance.
- Sound and safe institutions governed by clear regulation and industry performance standards.
- Financial and institutional sustainability is necessary to ensure the continuity and certainty of investments.
- Competition to ensure choice and affordability for clients.

Former United Nations Secretary-General Kofi Annan, on 29 December 2003, said, "The stark reality is that most poor people in the world still lack access to sustainable financial services, whether it is savings, credit, or insurance. The great challenge is to address the constraints that exclude people from full participation in the financial sector. Together, we can build inclusive financial sectors that help people improve their lives."

In 2009, former United Nations Secretary-General Ban Ki-moon appointed Queen Máxima of the Netherlands as the United Nations Secretary-General's Special Advocate for Inclusive Finance for Development (UNSGSA), housed in the United Nations Development Programme (UNDP). As the UN Secretary-General's Special Advocate, Queen Máxima is a leading global voice on advancing universal access to and responsible usage of affordable, effective, and safe financial services.

Since 2011, more than 1.2 billion people have gained access to financial services—and therefore have a better chance to transform their lives. Leading up to the adoption of the Sustainable Development Goals (SDGs) in 2015, the UNSGSA and UN member-state partners worked to ensure financial inclusion's strong presence within the agenda. As a result, financial inclusion is now referenced in seven of the 17 goals as a key enabler for fulfilling the SDGs, and the General Assembly has passed a resolution stressing its importance.

Over time financial inclusion has made strides forward: 515 million more people gained access to financial services between 2014 and 2017; 50+ countries have adopted financial inclusion plans and strategies; the standard-setting bodies (SSBs) now regularly meet for the purpose of addressing financial inclusion; and growing research is showing strong links between financial inclusion and major development goals.

== Measurement ==
Several surveys and datasets have worked to measure various aspects of financial inclusion, including access to and usage of financial services. Some sources, such as the World Bank's Global Findex database or the Gates Foundation's Financial Inclusion Tracker Surveys are household surveys attempting to measure usage of financial services from the consumer's perspective. Other data sources like the International Monetary Fund's Financial Access Surveys focus more on the firm side, measuring the supply of financial institutions in a country. Still others focus more on the regulatory environment for financial access, such as the GSMA's Mobile Money Regulatory Index, or the World Bank's, now defunct, Doing Business Report.

These data have been used in a range of ways, from donor organizations, such as the Millennium Challenge Corporation incentivizing country governments to do more to improve financial inclusion, to individual countries better understanding where they need to target interventions. The United Nations uses two of these indicators (from Findex and the Financial Access Surveys) to measure Sustainable Development Goal 8.10. Studies show that none of the current indicators measure financial inclusion as per globally accepted definitions of the concept, including definitions by UN and World Bank.

== Initiatives by country ==
=== In the Philippines ===
Four million unbanked Filipinos are seen to benefit from the nascent credit scoring industry, a development that is seen to serve the people that is classified at the bottom of the economy with easy access to credit once the service is available to the public. Marlo R. Cruz, president and chief executive officer of CIBI Information, Inc. (CIBI) as one of the accredited credit bureaus in the Philippines, highlighted that this is expected to unlock much economic potential in sectors of the economy that are crucial for inclusive growth.

As per Cruz, "Many people still do not realize that the value of having a credit opportunity is synonymous with generating financial power. Creditworthiness is the same as owning a keycard that can be used in navigating to the society of better possibilities."

The Bangko Sentral ng Pilipinas (BSP) reports on Financial Inclusion Initiatives and Financial Inclusion in the Philippines, summarizing the country's accomplishments and significant milestones in financial inclusion. These reports indicate that 4 out of 10 Filipinos saved money in 2015 (up from 2 out of 10 in 2009). Among Filipino adults, 24.5% never saved and only 31.3% (up from 26.6%) have an account at a formal financial institution. The lack of enough money was cited as the main reason for not having a bank account. While there has been significant progress, much more must be done.

As an emerging country with a sizeable number of people living in poverty, access to financial services is an important challenge. Based on a March 18, 2016, report from the Philippine Statistics Authority, the country's 2015 poverty incidence (the proportion of people below the poverty line versus the total population) is at 26.3%, while the subsistence incidence (the proportion of Filipinos in extreme or subsistence poverty) is at 12.1%. This number means that there are around 26 million Filipinos who are still living below the poverty line.

=== In India ===
==== History ====
The concept of financial inclusion, extending financial services to those who typically lack access, has been a goal for the Government of India since the 1950s.

The nationalization of banks, which occurred from the mid-1950s to the late 1960s, culminating in 1969 with the nationalization of 14 commercial banks by Prime Minister Indira Gandhi, brought banking facilities to previously unreached areas of the country. The "branching" of banks into rural areas increased lending for agriculture and other unserved rural populations and Indira Gandhi spoke of it as a tactic to "accelerate development" and to address poverty and unemployment.

The Lead Bank Scheme followed nationalization as a way to coordinate banks and credit institutions by districts to more comprehensively ensure that rural areas had their credit needs met. In 1975, the Government of India followed this with efforts to specifically reach rural areas by establishing Regional Rural Banks (RRBs) meant to exclusively meet demand in the rural economy and the number of RRBs has significantly increased over the years.

By the early 2000s, the term 'financial inclusion' was being used in the Indian context. In 2004 the Khan Commission, created by the Reserve Bank of India (RBI), investigated the state of financial inclusion in India and laid out a series of recommendations. In response, RBI Governor Y. Venugopal Reddy, expressed concern regarding the exclusion of millions from the formal financial system and urged banks to better align their existing practices with the objective of financial inclusion in both his annual and midterm policy statements. The RBI has continued in its efforts in conjunction with the Government of India to develop banking products, craft new regulations, and advocate for financial inclusion.

States or union territories such as Puducherry, Himachal Pradesh and Kerala announced 100% financial inclusion in all their districts. The Indian Reserve Bank vision for 2020 is to open nearly 600 million new customers' accounts and service them through a variety of channels by leveraging IT. However, illiteracy, low-income savings, and lack of bank branches in rural areas remain a roadblock to financial inclusion in many states, and there is inadequate legal and financial structure.

=== In the United Kingdom ===
The Financial Conduct Authority (FCA) conducts a biennial Financial Lives survey of UK adults, which serves as the primary measure of financial inclusion and exclusion in the country. The 2024 survey found that approximately 900,000 UK adults lacked a current account, down from 1.3 million in 2017. Unbanked adults were disproportionately likely to be unemployed or not in work due to long-term illness. The same survey found that 13.1 million adults (24% of the UK adult population) had low financial resilience, meaning they had missed payments, were struggling to meet financial commitments, or lacked sufficient savings to manage financial difficulties.

In March 2017, the House of Lords Select Committee on Financial Exclusion published Tackling Financial Exclusion: A Country that Works for Everyone?, the first major parliamentary investigation into financial exclusion in the UK. The report made 22 recommendations covering government leadership, regulation, access to financial services, and credit and borrowing. In response, the government appointed a Minister for Financial Inclusion within the Department for Work and Pensions and established a Financial Inclusion Policy Forum to coordinate cross-government efforts.

Since 2016, the nine largest current account providers in the UK have been required under the Payment Accounts Regulations 2015 to offer basic bank accounts that are fee-free for standard transactions, including failed payments, removing the risk of unintended overdrafts. By 2024, approximately 4.3 million adults held a basic bank account, an increase of one million since 2020.

In February 2021, the FCA published the Woolard Review, a review of change and innovation in the unsecured credit market conducted by Christopher Woolard CBE, the FCA's former interim chief executive. The review set out 26 recommendations, including bringing unregulated buy now, pay later products under FCA regulation, encouraging mainstream lenders to serve underserved segments of the credit market, and reforming the Credit Unions Act 1979 to expand the range of products credit unions could offer.

The Debt Respite Scheme, commonly known as Breathing Space, came into force in England and Wales on 4 May 2021. The scheme provides individuals with problem debt a 60-day moratorium during which creditors must pause enforcement action and freeze interest, fees, and charges, giving debtors time to access professional debt advice. A separate mental health crisis moratorium offers stronger protections lasting for the duration of a person's crisis treatment plus 30 days. In its first year of operation, 63,864 individuals entered the scheme.

==== Financial sector strategies ====
In India, RBI initiated several measures to achieve greater financial inclusion. These rely on the efforts of the financial sector. These initiatives include no-frills accounts (NFAs), now known as basic savings bank deposit accounts (BSBDAs) can be opened with zero or minimal balances, removing a cost barrier to banking. Banks are also meant to charge minimal overdraft fees on NFAs. The RBI continues to change and relax policies regarding these accounts in an effort to better serve bank customers.

Know-your-customer (KYC) requirements for opening bank accounts were relaxed for small accounts in August 2005, eliminating a documentation barrier to banking. The new procedure only requires an introduction by an account holder who has been subjected to the full KYC screening. Additionally, banks were permitted to accept more easily produced forms of documentation for proof of identity and address.

The business correspondents (BC) model was launched in January 2006, when the RBI permitted banks to engage intermediaries in the banking process. This model enables banks to service neglected areas by allowing intermediaries to facilitate transactions and deliver other banking services directly. Originally, a fairly limited number of entities, including NGOs and certain microfinance institutions, were eligible to act as BCs; however, in 2010, the list was expanded to include for-profit companies In 2018, operators of Common Service Centers (CSCs) who work with local governing gram panchayats also began working as BCs to further improve penetration of banking services.

Expansion of financial technology, or fintech, has been proposed as an effective strategy to achieve financial inclusion. While incorporation of technology does pose some risks, it is being used to deliver banking services to those in rural and remote areas who are typically unserved. The United Nations 2030 Agenda for Sustainable Development (UN-2030-ASD) and the G20 High-Level Principles for Digital Financial Inclusion (G20-HLP-DFI) describe the importance of using Fintech to reduce financial exclusion and income inequality, which means that financial inclusion through Fintech may show significant signs on the reduction of inequality. Banks have been advised to make effective use of information and communications technology (ICT) to provide banking services to people directly through the BC model, where the accounts can be operated by even illiterate customers by using biometrics, thus ensuring the security of transactions and enhancing confidence in the banking system. In 2018 the World Bank and International Monetary Fund (IMF) launched the Bali Fintech Agenda to provide a framework for domestic policy discussions around deepening access to financial services in a variety of different contexts.

Unique credit cards are now offered by banks, the most popular being general purpose credit cards (GCCs) and Kisan credit cards. These unique cards offer credit to those in rural and semi-urban areas, farmers, and others with adjusted collateral and security requirements with the objective of providing hassle-free credit.

Electronic benefit transfer (EBT) is being implemented by banks at the advice of the RBI with the goal of reducing dependence on cash, lowering transaction costs, and address corruption.

Increasing the number of rural banks remains a priority for the RBI. In 2009, the RBI relaxed previous policies requiring authorization before opening new branches in the hopes that simplified authorization would increase branches in underserved areas. Beginning in 2011, the RBI required 25% of new branches opened in a given year be in unbanked rural areas to ensure a more even spread of banking facilities.

The self-help group (SHG) linkage model has also been proposed to improve financial inclusion by linking community groups to the formal banking sector through government programs, credit cooperatives, NGOs, or other microfinance institutions. Group-based models in which members pool their savings have also been seen as tools for social and economic empowerment, particularly when women are leaders and participants.

==== Government policy strategies ====
The Mahatma Gandhi National Rural Employment Guarantee Act (MGNREGA) is meant to provide supplemental employment at a guaranteed minimum wage and facilitate financial inclusion to empower women and rural laborers. While achieving financial inclusion is not its main goal, the program directly deposits wages into bank accounts as a way to limit corruption, speed delivery of benefits, and connect wage laborers to bank accounts.

The Pradhan Mantri Jan Dhan Yojana policy scheme was announced by Prime Minister Narendra Modi in his 2014 Independence Day Speech and launched in August 2014 in an effort to provide "universal access" to banking through the creation of basic banking accounts that come with other basic financial services. Modi informed all Indian banks of the initiative and declared it a national priority. On the inauguration day of the scheme, 1.5 crore (15 million) bank accounts were opened and since then, more than 18 million bank accounts have been created.

In 2016, the Government of India instituted a sweeping demonetization policy in an attempt to stop corruption and the flow of black money. This move forced people to deposit their money into banks or see its value evaporate, with the goal of integrating citizens into a cashless and taxable economy and banking system. While India has seen new bank accounts continue to open in the wake of this policy change and an overall increase in the use of digital payment systems and other financial services, the policy change caused an extreme disruption to the financial system, and debate continues on its efficacy.

==== Measuring financial inclusion ====
Readily available data outlining gaps in access and contextualizing the situation of financial inclusion is necessary for both service providers and policymakers looking to achieve financial inclusion. Several organizations conduct surveys to measure indicators of financial inclusion and collect both supply- and demand-side data. MIX is one platform that produces data-driven reports to track progress towards financial inclusion across the globe. According to Tapan Kumar Pradhan none of the currently used indices in India measure financial inclusion as per globally accepted operational definitions of the concept.

In 2013, the finance minister of India, P. Chidambaram launched the CRISIL Inclusix, an index to measure the status of financial inclusion in India. CRISIL, India's leading credit rating and research company, is collecting data from 666 districts in India and ranking them on a scale from 0 to 100 based on four parameters of financial services. CRISIL publishes semi-frequent reports based on their findings with regional, state-wise, and district-wise assessments of financial inclusion.

Some key conclusions from the 2018 report are:

- The all-India CRISIL Inclusix score of 58.0 is above average as of April 2016; this is a significant improvement from 35.4 in 2009.
- Deposit penetration is the key driver of financial inclusion—the number of deposit accounts (1646 million) is almost eight times the number of credit accounts (196 million).
- The top three states are Kerala, Karnataka, and Andhra Pradesh.

==== Controversy ====
Financial inclusion in India is often closely connected to the aggressive microcredit policies that were introduced without appropriate regulations, oversight, or consumer education policies. As a result, consumers quickly became over-indebted to the point of committing suicide and lending institutions saw repayment rates collapse after politicians in one of the country's largest states called on borrowers to stop paying back their loans. The crisis threatened the existence of the $4 billion Indian microcredit industry and has been compared to the subprime mortgage crisis in the United States. The crisis serves as a reminder of the necessity of appropriate regulatory and educational frameworks and it remains a challenge to separate microcredit from the large and complex field of financial inclusion. A report by Dvara Research also points to the exclusion in the Direct Benefit Transfer scheme of the Government.

=== In Tanzania ===
With a population of 55.57 million people and only 19% of its population enrolled in an account with a formal bank, Tanzania remains largely unbanked. Poverty alleviation is often linked with a given population's access to formal banking instruments, and mobile money can serve as a crucial bridge for offering savings, credit, and insurance to Tanzania's rural population.

In 2006 just 11% of Tanzanians had access to a financial account, but with the advent of digital financial services that number has increased to 60%. The current situation in Tanzania has improved steadily over the past 12 years with the introduction of mobile money by Tanzania's main telecom providers. The quick expansion of financial inclusion in Tanzania is almost entirely due to the proliferation of mobile banking options. While a recent cooling effect has taken place due to a government crackdown on counterfeit SIM cards, over half of Tanzania's population has access to a degree of financial services through mobile banking.

=== In the United States ===
The United States began to adopt microfinance (MFI) ideals in the late 1980s and early 1990s. Compared to other countries, the United States was late to implement these changes, but nevertheless, once active, the US had the experience of other countries to draw upon. According to the Board of Governors of the Federal Reserve System, the expansion opened a new avenue to disadvantaged communities, primarily African Americans to "expand economic opportunities and to foster community economic development". This action is tailored to the needs of low- to moderate-income entrepreneurs. One criticism of MFI in the US is that its services did not extend outside of providing credit, whereas other MFI programs overseas "extended their offerings to deliver education, training, and other relevant services". To address this gap, MFI nonprofit organizations emerged, many focused on specific minority populations, such as African Americans, who are excluded from mainstream credit.

Racial inequality in the United States reduces the opportunity for African Americans to receive financial support compared to White Americans. This is due to the preexisting conflicts in the US that continue to remain relevant in the modern world. Organizations such as Main Street Launch, an Oakland, California–based microfinance organization centered on empowering African American entrepreneurs, were able to flourish due to the value they brought to local communities. The big banks viewed microfinance organizations as a "tax incentive", considering the money they offered these organizations was exempted by the US government. Another beneficial aspect that these MFI organizations brought was economic prosperity to entrepreneurs and, most importantly, to their local community. Through the empowerment of their local communities, MFI organizations are able to reach larger marginalized communities to support and promote upward mobility. Over the past several decades that MFI organizations have been operating within the United States, they have loaned over several billion dollars (~15 billion) and have had a ~97% repayment rate.

At the individual level, banks work to enhance financial inclusion by offering products and services to all communities across America. In 2019, most Americans were banked, with about 94.6% of the population having a checking or savings account with an insured FDIC institution. The remaining unbanked population represents a small percentage, about 7 million people, but most of them represent poor and minority communities (Association, 2021). According to the American Banker Association's 2021 Bank Access Report, some of the reasons unbanked individuals have named for not wanting an account include lack of trust in banks, not having enough money to keep accounts open, or feeling bank fees are high. In an effort to promote financial inclusion and address the structural and motivational barriers for those without a bank account, the Bank On program was created, which offers accounts with no overdraft fees, online bill pay, and debit or prepaid cards.

On May 25, 2020, George Floyd Jr., an unarmed Black man, was murdered by police officers. The assault was filmed and made available to the world via media outlets and social media. The event sparked a renewed commitment by many organizations to address racial division in the United States. Many financial institutions like Ally, JP Morgan Chase, Bank of America and Citi provided statements about financial inclusion and racial equity that detailed efforts to drive change.

During the COVID-19 pandemic, digital financial exclusion has become more prominent in the US as some businesses no longer accept cash for purchases.

=== In Indonesia ===
Indonesia's national strategy for financial inclusion was established in 2016. The strategy is a guideline for all government institutions in Indonesia and private stakeholders to improve public access to financial services. Priority segments of Indonesia's financial inclusion programs are:

- The lowest-income families, particularly those with limited access to financial services or without access at all.
- Micro businesses and small entrepreneurs with limited resources to expand their business; and
- Female people, people with disabilities, migrant workers, communities in disadvantaged and remote areas, the elderly, former convicts, homeless communities, students, and youth.

By the end of 2019, 75 percent of the adult population in Indonesia is expected to have access to formal financial services. The National Council for Financial Inclusion, led by the President of Indonesia, is established to coordinate and synchronize the implementation of the strategy, to determine plans and policies in solving problems and obstacles within the implementation, and to support governors and regent/mayors in determining regional financial inclusion policies at provincial and district/city levels.

In 2019, 76.19% of the adult population in Indonesia were said to have accessed financial services.

=== In China ===
In China, financial inclusion is an important component of Xi Jinping's concept of the Chinese Dream.

In 2015, the China Academy of Financial Inclusion was established at Renmin University. The Academy is a government think tank tasked with developing financial inclusion mechanisms for China.

== Digital financial inclusion ==
Technology-enabled innovations represent an opportunity to promote financial inclusion. Inclusive digital financial services refer to mobile money, online accounts, electronic payments, insurance and credit, combinations of them, and newer financial technology (fintech) apps, which can reach people who were formerly excluded. For example, digital financial services can provide low-income households with access to affordable and convenient tools that can help increase their economic opportunities or access to credit.Recent evidence highlights the growing role of digital payment systems in expanding access to financial services. A 2025 systematic review found that digital payment systems, mobile money, and online financial platforms significantly improve financial inclusion in developing and underserved regions. Additional research from Saudi Arabia shows that digital financial inclusion supports socioeconomic sustainability and helps reduce financial disparities across population groups.

There is evidence that digital financial services can empower women to earn more and build assets, helping address that 35% of women worldwide—approximately 980 million—remain excluded from the formal financial system.

== Tracking through budget analysis ==
To assess whether such inclusion as earmarked in policies is actually reaching the common beneficiaries, since the 1990s, there has been serious efforts both in the government agencies and in the civil society to monitor the fund flow process and to track the outcome of public expenditure through budget tracking. Organizations like the International Budget Partnership (IBP) are undertaking global surveys in more than 100 countries to study the openness (transparency) in the budget-making process. There are various tools used by different civil society groups to track public expenditure. Such tools may include performance monitoring of public services, social audits, and public accountability surveys. In India, the institutionalization of the Right to Information (RTI) has been a supporting tool for activists and citizen groups for budget tracking and advocacy for social inclusion.

== Bank stability ==
The theoretical and empirical evidence on the link between financial inclusion and bank stability is limited. Banking literature indicates several potential channels through which financial inclusion may influence bank stability. A recent study appeared in the Journal of Economic Behavior & Organization [84] and found [84] a robust positive association between financial inclusion and bank stability. The authors show that the positive association is more pronounced with those banks that have higher retail deposit funding shares and lower marginal costs of providing banking services and also with those that operate in countries with stronger institutional quality.

== Evidence on the effectiveness of interventions ==
Results from research on the effectiveness of financial inclusion programs to improve economic, social, behavioral, and gender-related outcomes in low- and middle-income countries have been mixed, and programs to improve access to financial services often have small or inconsistent effects on income, health, and other social outcomes. Programs geared toward savings opportunities have had smaller but more consistently positive effects and fewer risks than credit-oriented programs.

== See also ==
- AFI Global Policy Forum
- Alliance for Financial Inclusion
- Digital divide
- Financial deepening
- Financial ethics
- Financial intelligence
- Financial social work
- The Maya Declaration
- Microjustice
- Money laundering
