= Comisión Nacional Bancaria y de Valores =

National Banking and Securities Commission
- Comisión Nacional Bancaria y de Valores

Agency overview
- Formed: 1879
- Jurisdiction: Mexico
- Headquarters: Insurgentes Sur No. 1991, Col. Guadalupe Inn, 01020 México D.F.
- Agency executive: Jesús de la Fuente Rodríguez, President
- Parent agency: Secretariat of Finance and Public Credit
- Website: Official page of the CNBV

The Comisión Nacional Bancaria y de Valores (CNBV; English: National Banking and Securities Commission) is an independent agency of the Mexican Secretariat of Finance and Public Credit (SHCP) with technical autonomy and executive powers over the Mexican financial system. Its main role is to supervise and regulate the entities that make up the Mexican financial system, in order to ensure its stability and proper operation, and to maintain and promote the healthy and balanced development of the financial system as a whole, in protecting the interests of the public. The president since November 2021 is the lawyer Jesús de la Fuente Rodríguez.

== History and evolution ==
The need for a regulatory agency of the Mexican financial institutions came together with the creation of the Mexican financial system in the late nineteenth century. Speaking specifically of Mexican financial institutions, the first response to this need was reflected in the Ley General de Instituciones de Crédito, which gave the SHCP responsibility for oversight of the credit system in Mexico.

The SHCP appointed auditors to each bank for the purposes of monitoring; however, this created an atmosphere of irresponsibility and inefficiency that led in 1889 to the creation of the so-called "Section of Supervision" within SHCP, which centralized the functions of monitoring and intervention. Five years later, the Section of Supervision would become an independent agency of the SHCP with the name of Inspector General of Institutions and Insurance Companies; it was renamed Regulatory and Inspection Commission of Credit Institutions in 1915.

Finally, the National Banking Commission (CNB) was born on December 24, 1924, as the only watchdog of Mexican banking institutions, with full operational freedom and independence from the SHCP.

Due to the evolution of the financial sector operations in Mexico, during the 1950s reform to Ley Federal de Instituciones de Finanzas was executed, which establishes the obligation of the CNB to inspect and monitor surety companies, after which the CNB became the Comisión Nacional Bancaria y de Seguros (National Commission for Banking and Insurance (1989)).

CNBS was split in December of the same year, into CNB and Comisión Nacional Bancaria de Seguros y Finanzas(National Banking Commission of Insurance and Finance) (Reforma a la Ley Reglamentaria del Servicio Público de Banca y Crédito) .

On April 16, 1946, the Official Gazette announced the creation of the Comisión Nacional de Valores (National Securities Commission) (CNV) as an autonomous body whose main function is to approve the offering of securities within the Mexican legal framework and approval / veto of registration to the stock exchanges and the securities to the public offering of traded registered securities. This would lead to the establishment of the Securities Market Law in 1975.

Thanks to the Ley de Mercado de Valores (Law of the Stock Market), greater order within the stock market was achieved through the application of auditing and generating new regulations. The LMV gave the market more efficient and simplicity, especially in control of supply, demand and operations; it also allowed greater security, faster transactions, regulation of activities of intermediaries and finally the creation of the Instituto para el Depósito de Valores (Institute for Deposit of Securities) ( Individual ) (officially SD Individual, SA de CV).

During 2008 and 2009, the CNBV undertook a process of internal restructuring, approving the Reglamento Interior de la CNBV 2009 (Internal Rules of CNBV 2009) and published in the Official Gazette on August 12, 2009. Currently, monitoring is the main function of the CNBV; it monitors the formation and financial transactions carried out by financial groups, combats organized crime, strengthen measures to ensure that financial institutions implement preventive control mechanisms and audit verifies compliance with legal and administrative requirements, streamlines the information requirements of the Mexican banking system, and investigates breaches of regulations.

== See also ==
- List of financial supervisory authorities by country

== Bibliography ==
- Dieck Assad, F. A. (2006). Instituciones financieras. México: McGraw Hill, 4a. ed.
