= CIBI Information =

Credit bureau in the Philippines

- Type: Private
- Industry: Information Services Credit Bureau
- Headquarters: Salustiana D. Ty Tower, Paseo de Roxas, Makati, Philippines
- Key people: Pia Arellano, President & CEO (2024 - present) Kriziel Mae B. Nieves, Chairman of the Board (present)
- Services: Credit bureau, credit score, business intelligence, background check, credit rating
- Website: http://www.cibi.com.ph

CIBI Information, Inc. or CIBI, formerly known as Credit Information Bureau, Inc., is the first and the only local credit bureau in the Philippines. CIBI started as a government entity under the Central Bank of the Philippines Department of Loans and Credit to initiate a credit information exchange system in the country. Founded in 1982, CIBI was established through the power of Presidential Decree 1941 created under Central Bank of the Philippines, now Bangko Sentral ng Pilipinas (BSP); the Securities and Exchange Commission (SEC) and the Financial Executives Institute of the Philippines (FINEX)

In 1997, Credit Information Bureau, Inc. was incorporated and transformed into a private entity and became CIBI Information, Inc. CIBI is a provider of information to businesses and individuals. The company also supplies compliance reports before accrediting agencies, industry partners and even hiring professionals.

In March 2016, CIBI Information, Inc. was one of the three credit bureaus and the only local firm accredited by the Credit Information Corporation (CIC) as a Special Accessing Entity.

== History ==
In 1981, Ferdinand Marcos, then President of the Republic of the Philippines, issued a Letter of Instructions No. 1107 mandating the Central Bank of the Philippines to analyze the probability of establishing and funding the operation of a credit bureau due to the disturbing increase of failures on corporate borrowers.

In adherence to the order, Central Bank of the Philippines organized the Credit Information Exchange System under the department of Loans and Credit. It was created to engage in collating, developing and analyzing credit information on individuals, institutions, business entities and other business concerns. It aims to develop and undertake the continuing exchange of credit data within its members and subscribers and to provide an impartial source of credit information for debtors, creditors and the public. This will also cooperate and guide government agencies in their credit information requirements.

On April 14, 1982, Credit Information Bureau, Inc. was incorporated as a non-stock, non-profit corporation. (See: Presidential Decree No. 1941)

=== Incorporation ===
CIBI was created pursuant to LOI No. 1107 dated February 16, 1981 and was further strengthened by PD No. 1941 which recognizes and supports CIBI as a suitable credit bureau to promote the development and maintenance of rational and efficient credit processes in the financial system and in the economy as a whole.

In 1997, CIBI Information, Inc. expand its coverage of background checking in national and international spectrum through groundwork and affiliations with local and foreign information and credit companies. Commercial operations as a separate entity commenced on April 1, 1999.

CIBI Information, Inc. became the partner of many corporate industries throughout the Philippines in applying measures for risk management by setting capability, compliance and legitimacy outlines for trade associates and suppliers. CIBI also validates personal information of their clients' current and potential human resources.

=== CIBI Foundation, Inc. ===
CIBI Foundation, Inc. is a founding member of the ASEAN Forum of Credit Rating Agencies (AFCRA), established on November 5, 1993 in Bangkok, Thailand.

On April 11, 2008, the Board of Directors (BOD) approved the amendment of the Company's Articles of Incorporation to include the development and operation of a call center business and similar services by providing customer management services through various channels and media, including but not limited to, telephone, cable, facsimile, electronic mail, web chat and all allied or related services as its primary activities. The BOD also approved for the company to formally engage in the business of providing services for outsourced business processes.

On June 16, 2008, the SEC approved the Company's Amended Articles of Incorporation. The company is 75% owned by Go Kim Pah Foundation and 25% owned by CIBI Foundation, Inc.

== Network ==
=== Local ===
CIBI validates and collects any available information using sources from both private and government institutions such as SEC, Department of Trade and Industry, Bangko Sentral ng Pilipinas (BSP), Land Transportation Office (LTO); schools, colleges, universities and other educational institutions.

CIBI is also a member and affiliate of various organizations and associations under different industries such as: IT and Business Processing Association of the Philippines (iBPAP); Supply Chain Management Association of the Philippines (SCMAP); Philippine Retailers Association (PRA) and Philippine Management Association of the Philippines - Cebu (PMAP-Cebu).

=== Other local affiliates ===
- Philippine Chamber of Commerce and Industry
- Credit Management Association of the Philippines
- Cebu Association of Credit Practitioners, Inc.
- Mactan Export Processing Zone (MEPZ)

CIBI also holds a seat as Committee Member of Department of Trade and Industry - Export Marketing Bureau (DTI-EMB). ETCC is an inter-agency committee created to recommended specific actions on export trade complaints filed with any bureau office of DTI which are referred to the EMB.

=== International ===
CIBI is a member of COFACE Credit Alliance Network, a worldwide trade-credit information and solutions; ASIAGATE, a company that provides corporate credit information and credit management services; and BIIA, a trade association among the information-provider entities around the world.

== Financial inclusion in the Philippines ==
On their submitted 2016 Year-End Report, credit education towards financial inclusion was conducted by CIBI to 30 out of 71 provinces in the Philippines. A percentage of 69% focuses on Luzon, 28% on Visayas and 3% on Mindanao or a total of 1,337 attendees, 636 small to large cooperatives and 117 small to medium enterprise. This corresponds to the impact of data that CIBI is taking into consideration in order to provide a comprehensive credit report and scores.

CIBI also actively take part on the credit education campaigns facilitated by the Philippine Cooperative Central Fund Federation (PCF) and the Credit Information Corporation (CIC).

== Strategic partnership ==
With CIBI as a data partner, FICO's local scoring service partner, Consumer CreditScores Philippines (CCS) are together managing the rollout of the Global FICO Score in the Philippines but with focus on the unbanked and underbanked.

== See also ==
- Philippine Rating Services Corp (PhilRatings)
