= Marlo R. Cruz =

- Cruz in February 2015
- Born: Marlo R. Cruz; August 14, 1960 (age 64); Philippines
- Education: Mapúa Institute of Technology
- Occupation(s): President and CEO of CIBI Information, Inc.
- Years active: 2007 – present
- Spouse: Isabelle Cruz

Marlo R. Cruz is a Filipino businessman who is president and CEO of CIBI Information, Inc. Cruz has expertise in leasing, credit and finance for over 28 years of practice.

He administered the Credit Management Association of the Philippines (CMAP) as president in 2003, 2005 and 2006; and became a SEC Accredited Compliance Officer in 2004.

Cruz was invited to become one of the panels during the 2016 APEC Finance Ministers’ Process (FMP) under the chairmanship of Cesar Purisima. He also appeared as one of the talking heads for On the Money by ABS-CBN News Channel on several episodes.

Marlo was hailed as the 'Face of Financial Inclusion' by the Manila Bulletin CEO profile last December 5, 2018.

He is a graduate of B.S. in Management and Industrial Engineering at Mapua Institute of Technology.
