= Credit score in the United States =

A credit score is a numerical expression derived from an analysis of an individual's credit history and credit report, used to estimate the relative likelihood that the individual will repay debts and meet other financial obligations. As a standardized and comparatively low-cost method of evaluating borrowers, credit scoring serves as a primary alternative to traditional forms of loan underwriting, enabling faster and more consistent credit decisions.

Lenders, such as banks and credit card companies, use credit scores to evaluate the risk of lending money to consumers. Lenders contend that widespread use of credit scores has made credit more widely available and less expensive for many consumers. Under the Dodd-Frank Act passed in 2010, a consumer is entitled to receive a free report of the specific credit score used if they are denied a loan, credit card or insurance due to their credit score.

Not all U.S. adults are scoreable under conventional credit scoring models. The Consumer Financial Protection Bureau estimates that approximately 26 million Americans have no credit record with any of the three major credit bureaus and are considered "credit invisible," while an additional 19 million have records too thin or too stale to generate a score. Together these groups represent roughly 45 million adults who may be unable to access conventional credit products or qualify for loans on standard terms. Credit invisibility disproportionately affects younger adults, Black and Hispanic consumers, and people in low-income neighborhoods.

== History ==
Before credit scores, credit was evaluated using credit reports from credit bureaus. During the late 1950s, banks started using computerized credit scoring to redefine creditworthiness as abstract statistical risk. The Equal Credit Opportunity Act banned denying credit on gender or marital status in 1974, along with race, nationality, religion, age, or receipt of public assistance in 1976. Credit scoring adoption accelerated to shield against discrimination lawsuits.

During the 1970s and 80s, the credit reporting industry relentlessly consolidated and moved aggressively into prescreening. The FICO score burst into public consciousness in 1995 when Freddie Mac had lenders use credit scoring for all new mortgage applications.

== Credit scoring models ==
Although various methods of estimating creditworthiness existed before, modern credit scoring models date to 1958, when Bill Fair and Earl Isaac created Credit Application Scoring Algorithms, their first credit scoring system.

=== FICO score ===
FICO credit score components
Core scoring factors
- Payment history (35%): Account payment records Tracks on-time payments, delinquencies, bankruptcies, and public records. The heaviest factor.
- Amounts owed (30%): Credit utilization ratio The amount of available credit currently being used across credit cards and revolving lines.
- Length of history (15%): Age of credit accounts Considers the age of your oldest account, newest account, and the average age of all accounts.
- New credit (10%): Recent inquiries and velocity Tracks newly opened accounts and hard credit inquiries. Multiple inquiries in a short window signal risk.
- Credit mix (10%): Diversity of accounts Evaluates the healthy mix of revolving credit (cards) and installment loans (mortgages, auto loans).

Standard FICO score ranges
- 800–850: Exceptional; Top tier; qualifies borrowers for the absolute lowest interest rates and premium terms.
- 740–799: Very good Demonstrates a highly dependable borrower; easily obtains favorable loan approvals.
- 670–739: Good; The median range for U.S. consumers; acceptable to most lenders with competitive rates.
- 580–669: Fair; Below national average; borrowers may face higher interest rates or require a security deposit.
- 300–579: Poor; High risk to lenders; often results in loan denial or strict collateral requirements.

Modern variants and data integrations
- UltraFICO: Cash flow analysis Enhances standard scores by linking consumer bank checking and savings data to demonstrate responsible financial behavior.
- FICO 10T: Trended data Analyzes a 24-month historical trajectory of balances and payment amounts rather than a single monthly snapshot.

The FICO score was first introduced in 1989 by FICO, then called Fair, Isaac, and Company. The FICO model is used by the vast majority of banks and credit grantors, and is based on consumer credit files of the three national credit bureaus: Experian, Equifax, and TransUnion. Because a consumer's credit file may contain different information at each of the companies, FICO scores can vary depending on which bureau provides the information to FICO to generate the score.

==== Makeup ====
Credit scores are designed to measure the risk of default by taking into account various factors in a person's financial history. Although the exact formulas for calculating credit scores are secret, FICO has disclosed the following components:

- Payment history (35%): Best described as the presence or lack of derogatory information. Bankruptcy, settlements, charge-offs, repossessions, foreclosures, and late payments can cause a FICO score to drop.
- Debt burden (30%): This category considers a number of debt-specific measurements. According to FICO there are six different metrics in the debt category including the debt to limit ratio, number of accounts with balances, the amount owed across different types of accounts, and the amount paid down on installment loans.
- Length of credit history or "time in file" (15%): As a credit history ages it can have a positive impact on its FICO score. There are several metrics in this category, most significantly the average age of the accounts on a report and the age of the oldest account.
- Types of credit used (10%): Consumers can benefit by having a history of managing different types of credit. Examples of types of credit include installment, revolving, consumer finance and mortgage.
- Recent searches for credit (10%): Hard credit inquiries or "hard pulls," which occur when consumers apply for a credit card or loan (revolving or otherwise), can hurt scores, especially if done in great numbers. Individuals who are "rate shopping" for a mortgage, auto loan, or student loan over a short period (two weeks or 45 days, depending on the generation of FICO score used) will likely not experience a meaningful decrease in their scores as a result of these types of inquiries, as the FICO scoring model considers all of those types of hard inquiries that occur within 14 or 45 days of each other as only one. Further, mortgage, auto, and student loan inquiries do not count at all in a FICO score if they are less than 30 days old. While all credit inquiries are recorded and displayed on personal credit reports for two years, they have no effect after the first year because FICO's scoring system ignores them after 12 months. Credit inquiries that were made by the consumer (such as pulling a credit report for personal use), by an employer (for employee verification), or by companies initiating pre-screened offers of credit or insurance do not have any impact on a credit score: these are called "soft inquiries" or "soft pulls", and do not appear on a credit report used by lenders, only on personal reports. Soft inquires are not considered by credit scoring systems.

These percentages are based on the importance of the five categories for the general population. For particular groups—for example, people who have not been using credit long—the relative importance of these categories may be different.

The makeup factors are limited to the individual's past (and continuing) behavior on credit. Contrary to common misconception, other financial factors such as age, employment status, assets, or income are not accounted. However, lenders are not prohibited from asking about and accounting these factors for particular lending considerations.

Getting a higher credit limit can help a credit score. The higher the credit limit on the credit card, the lower the utilization ratio average for all of a borrower's credit card accounts. The utilization ratio is the amount owed divided by the amount extended by the creditor and the lower it is the better a FICO rating, in general. So if a person has one credit card with a used balance of $500 and a limit of $1,000 as well as another with a used balance of $700 and $2,000 limit, the average ratio is 40 percent ($1,200 total used divided by $3,000 total limits). If the first credit card company raises the limit to $2,000, the ratio lowers to 30 percent, which could boost the FICO rating.

There are other special factors that can weigh on the FICO score.

- Any money owed because of a court judgment, tax lien, etc., carries an additional penalty, especially when recent.
- Having one or more newly opened consumer finance credit accounts may also be a negative.

==== Ranges ====
There are several types of FICO credit score: classic or generic or general-purpose score, industry-specific scores (bankcard score, auto score, mortgage score, personal finance score, and installment loan score), XD score, NextGen risk score, and UltraFICO score. The classic FICO credit score (named FICO credit score) is between 300 and 850, and 59% of people had between 700 and 850, 45% had between 740 and 850, and 1.2% of Americans held the highest FICO score (850) in 2019. According to FICO, the median FICO credit score in 2006 was 723 and 721 in 2015. The average FICO Score 8 in the US was 710 in 2020 and 716 in April 2021. The FICO bankcard score, FICO auto score, FICO personal finance score, and FICO installment loan score are between 250 and 900. The FICO Mortgage Score and FICO Score XD 2 are between 300 and 850. Higher scores indicate lower credit risk. Experian classifies FICO credit scores lower than 580 as very poor, 580–669 as fair, 670–739 as good, 740–799 as very good, and 800–850 as exceptional. Equifax considers FICO scores lower than 580 as poor, 580–669 as fair, 670–739 as good, 740–799 as very good, and 800–850 as excellent. Individuals with FICO scores less than 670 are seen as subprime borrowers.

Each individual actually has over 60 credit scores for the FICO scoring model, as each of the three national credit bureaus (Equifax, Experian and TransUnion) has its own database, but the most used are 40. Data about an individual consumer can vary from bureau to bureau. FICO scores have different names at each of the different credit reporting agencies: Equifax (Beacon), TransUnion (FICO Risk Score, Classic) and Experian (Experian/FICO Risk Model). There are several active generations of FICO credit scores: FICO 98 (1998), FICO 04 (2004), FICO 8 (2009), FICO 9 (2014), FICO 10 and FICO 10T (2020). A new type of FICO score named UltraFICO score was released in 2019. The FICO 95 credit score released in 1995 and Equifax FICO 98 scores are no longer in use. The Experian FICO 98 score is named FICO Score 2, Experian FICO 04 score is FICO Score 3, TransUnion FICO 04 score is FICO Score 4, and Equifax FICO 04 score is FICO Score 5. The FICO Score XD is made with alternative data and was released in 2016. Mortgage lenders use EX FICO Score 2, EQ FICO Score 5 and TU FICO Score 4, but not a real FICO Mortgage Score. Consumers can buy their FICO scores plus credit report for Equifax, TransUnion, and Experian from the FICO website (myFICO), and they will get their FICO score 8, FICO Bankcard Score 8, FICO Auto Score 8, FICO Score 9, FICO Auto Score 9, FICO Bankcard Score 9, and other FICO scores (1998 and 2004 versions). Individuals can get up to 28 FICO scores (10 EX, 9 EQ, 9 TU) on myFICO. Consumers also can buy their FICO Score 8 for Equifax in the website for that credit bureau, and their FICO Score 8 for Experian on its website. Anyone can register and get their free EX FICO score 8 with Experian CreditWorks Basic. Other types of FICO scores cannot be obtained by individuals in a personal capacity, only by lenders. Some credit cards issued by banks and some credit unions offer a free FICO score several times per year to their cardholders.

==== FICO NextGen Risk Score ====
The FICO NextGen Risk Score is a scoring model designed by the FICO company for assessing consumer credit risk. This score was introduced in 2001 (FICO score NG1), and in 2003 (FICO score NG2) the second generation of NextGen was released. In 2004, FICO research showed a 4.4% increase in the number of accounts above cutoff while simultaneously showing a decrease in the number of bad, charge-off and bankrupt accounts when compared to FICO traditional. FICO NextGen score is between 150 and 950.

Each of the major credit agencies markets this score generated with their data differently:

- Experian: FICO Advanced Risk Score
- Equifax: Pinnacle
- TransUnion: FICO Risk Score NextGen

==== FICO SBSS ====
The FICO Small Business Scoring Service (SBSS) score is used to evaluate small business credit applicants. This score can evaluate the personal credit report of a business owner along with the business credit report of the business itself. Financial information of the business may be evaluated as well. The score range for the FICO SBSS score is 0–300. A higher score indicates less risk. Applications for SBA 7(a) loans for $350,000 or less will be prescreened using this score. A minimum score of 140 is needed to pass this prescreen, though most lenders require scores of 160 or more.

=== VantageScore ===
In 2006, to try to win business away from FICO, the three major credit-reporting agencies introduced VantageScore credit score, which differs from FICO in several ways. According to court documents filed in the FICO v. VantageScore federal lawsuit, the VantageScore market share was less than 6% in 2006. The VantageScore methodology initially produced a score range from 501 to 990 (VantageScore 1.0 score and VantageScore 2.0 score), but VantageScore 3.0 score adopted the score range of 300–850 in 2013. The VantageScore 4.0 score was released in mid-2017 and also uses a range of 300–850. Consumers can get free VantageScores from free credit report websites, and from some credit cards issued by Capital One, American Express, U.S. Bank, Chase Bank, TD Bank, N.A., Synchrony Bank, and USAA Bank. The VantageScore 3.0 and 4.0 lower than 550 is very poor, 550–649 is poor, 650–699 is fair, 700–749 is good, and 750–850 is excellent. As of 2024, Synchrony Bank uses VantageScore 4.0 as the credit score for granting its credit cards. In July 2025, the Federal Housing Finance Agency announced that Fannie Mae and Freddie Mac will permit lenders to use VantageScore 4.0 in addition to the long-standing FICO score for underwriting conforming mortgages.

=== CE Score ===
CE Score is published by CE Analytics. This score is distributed to 6,500 lenders through the Credit Plus network. It has a range of 350 to 850.

=== Educational credit scores ===
A number of scores have been developed to help consumers understand and improve their credit scores. Most were introduced before FICO began sharing details of their model and encouraging lenders to share scores with consumers. While these scores can help consumers monitor and improve their score, these scores do not replicate the FICO score and may be substantially less accurate if they use less complete data. They also assign different score ranges and rankings to consumers, which has created confusion among consumers who expect to have a single score number. Discussions on the myFICO forum and elsewhere have referred to non-FICO scores as FAKO scores.

Experian has the Plus Score between 330 and 830, and Experian's National Equivalence Score ranges from 360 to 840. Equifax has the Equifax Credit Score of between 280 and 850. CreditXpert offers a simulation score to estimate the impact of various actions on a score range of 350 to 850.

=== Other credit scores ===
Lenders may choose to use non-FICO credit scores to gain additional insight on consumers, especially those with limited traditional credit history who might be difficult to score. These scores may be added to the FICO score if they provide unique insights or used instead of the FICO score if they provide similar predictiveness. Most of these scores are based significantly on data not available through the national credit bureaus (alternative data), such as rental, utility, and telecom payment data or public record information such as property deeds and mortgages, liens, personal property titles, tax records, and licensing data.

The Credit Optics Score by SageStream blends traditional and alternative credit data with machine learning modeling techniques and ranges from 1 to 999. LexisNexis RiskView score, based on wide-ranging public records, ranges from 501 to 900. CoreLogic Credco reports on property related public records and its Anthem Credit Score ranges from 325 to 850. PRBC allows consumers to self-enroll and report their own non-debt payment history. The PRBC alternative credit score range is 100 to 850. There are also scores like ChexSystems Consumer Score designed for financial account verification services ranging from 100 to 899. The L2C (Link2Credit) score by L2C, Inc. ranges from 300 to 850. Scorelogix LLC offers the JSS Credit Score, which assesses credit risk based on job history, income, and the impact of the economy. A Behavioral Risk Score (0 to 999) is used by Comenity Bank and Comenity Capital Bank. TU CreditVision Scores and TU New Account score (300-850) are issued by TransUnion. The latter is used by WebBank.

== Credit building products ==
Consumers who are credit invisible or whose files are too thin to score cannot qualify for most conventional credit products. Credit builder loans, offered by credit unions and community banks, address this by holding the loan proceeds in a locked savings account while the borrower makes monthly installment payments that are reported to the credit bureaus. Since the mid-2010s, financial technology companies have offered comparable products through mobile applications without a membership requirement. Self Financial, founded in 2015, offers secured installment loans issued through partner banks; Kikoff, founded in 2019, offers a revolving line of credit that reports to the credit bureaus; and Chime offers a secured card whose credit limit is set by a linked deposit account that also funds monthly repayment, with card activity reported to all three bureaus. Separately, Experian Boost, a free service launched in 2019, adds on-time utility, phone, streaming and rent payments to a consumer's Experian credit report only.

Product structure determines which scoring components are affected. Installment products report only installment activity and so build payment history alone, while revolving products report a balance against a credit limit and therefore also generate a credit utilization ratio, part of the debt burden category. Rent and bill reporting adds existing recurring payments to a file rather than creating a new obligation, but its effect is limited both by the scoring model — VantageScore 4.0 and FICO 10T consider rent and utility payments while the classic FICO scores long used in mortgage underwriting do not — and by whether the payments reach the bureaus at all, which was the case for about 13 percent of consumers in 2025. In a randomized controlled trial of 1,531 credit union members commissioned by the CFPB and conducted by the RAND Corporation, participants without existing debt saw modest score gains while those already carrying debt saw slight declines and became more likely to miss payments on their other loans; nearly 40 percent of borrowers made at least one late payment on the credit builder loan itself.

== Free annual credit report ==
As a result of the FACT Act (Fair and Accurate Credit Transactions Act), each legal U.S. resident is entitled to a free copy of their credit report from each credit reporting agency once every twelve months. The law requires all three agencies, Equifax, Experian, and Transunion, to provide reports. These credit reports do not contain credit scores from any of the three agencies. The three credit bureaus run Annualcreditreport.com, where users can get their free credit reports. Non-FICO credit scores are available as an add-on feature of the report for a fee. This fee is usually $7.95, as the FTC regulates this charge through the Fair Credit Reporting Act. The FTC tracks various scams and reports on other sites that provide fake credit reports or charge fees for their services. Instances of illegal behaviors by credit report services have been settled in court such as that of Experian Consumer Direct that was charged with deceptively signing people up for credit report monitoring services that charged them monthly fees.

== Non-traditional uses of credit scores ==
Credit scores are often used in determining prices for auto and homeowner's insurance. Starting in the 1990s, the national credit reporting agencies that generate credit scores have also been generating more specialized insurance scores, which insurance companies then use to rate the insurance risk of potential customers. Studies indicate that the majority of those who are insured pay less in insurance through the use of scores. These studies point out that people with higher scores have fewer claims.

In 2009, TransUnion representatives testified before the Connecticut legislature about their practice of marketing credit score reports to employers for use in the hiring process. Legislators in at least twelve states introduced bills, and three states have passed laws, to limit the use of credit check during the hiring process.

== Criticism and controversies ==
Credit scoring systems have garnered considerable criticism from various media outlets, debtors unions, consumer law organizations, and government officials. Discrimination against prospective employees, rejection of rental applications, racial bias, poor risk prediction, manipulation of algorithms, and overall immorality are some of the concerns raised regarding the system. The scoring system has also been studied as a form of classification to shape an individual's life-chances—a form of economic inequality. The classification scheme is necessitated by the loss of collective social services and risk. The credit scoring system in the United States is similar to the Social Credit System in China. The use of credit information in connection with applying for various types of insurance or rental applications has drawn criticism, because obtaining and maintaining employment, housing, transport, and insurance are among the basic functions of meaningful participation in modern society, and in some cases (such as auto insurance) are mandated by law.

US credit reporting companies have been accused of illegal behaviors by misstating costs and usefulness of credit scores, tricked consumers into recurring payments, and lying about reports. The Consumer Financial Protection Bureau (CFPB) charged both Equifax, Inc. and TransUnion with deliberate deceit of consumers about the value of the credit scores sold, as they were caught providing different scores to consumers than what was being provided to lenders. They were also charged with deceit by charging recurring fees to those enrolled in trial services. The agencies were required to pay $23 million in fines and restitution.

Equifax agreed to a settlement of $575 million with the Federal Trade Commission, the CFPB, and states related to a data breach that occurred in 2017 where 147 million people were affected by their personal information being exposed.

In 2020, a Pennsylvania man filed a lawsuit against TransUnion over being mislabeled as a terrorist due to having the same first name as suspected terrorists. This was not the first instance as similar events occurred in 2007 in Colorado where a woman's credit report labeled her as a drug trafficker, and in 2017 in California where multiple people had their credit reports sold to a car dealership that labeled them as terrorists.

In January 2025, the CFPB finalized a rule barring medical debt from credit reports, but a federal court vacated it in July 2025 as exceeding the Bureau's authority under the Fair Credit Reporting Act.

== See also ==
- Alternative data
- Bankruptcy risk score
- Comparison of free credit report websites
- Credit scorecards
- Seasoned tradeline
- Social Credit System
