= VantageScore =

Credit scoring system

VantageScore is a consumer credit-scoring system in the United States, created through a joint venture of the three major credit bureaus (Equifax, Experian, and TransUnion). The model is managed and maintained by an independent company, VantageScore Solutions, LLC, that was formed in 2006 and is jointly owned by the three bureaus. VantageScore models compete with the FICO score produced by Fair Isaac Corp. (FICO). Like the models developed by FICO, VantageScore models operate on data stored in the consumer credit files maintained by the three national credit bureaus. VantageScore models and FICO models use statistical analysis on those data to predict the likelihood a consumer will default on a loan. Both VantageScore and FICO models represent risk of loan default in the form of three-digit scores, with higher scores indicating lower risk, but VantageScore and FICO use different, proprietary analytical methods, and scores from one system cannot be translated into one from the other.

== History and Development ==
=== Creation and Early Years ===
VantageScore was created in 2006 as a joint venture between the three major credit bureaus: Equifax, Experian, and TransUnion. The primary motivation behind its creation was to introduce a more consistent credit scoring model across all three bureaus, addressing inconsistencies that existed in earlier scoring systems.

The development of VantageScore was also driven by a desire to:

- Provide a more inclusive scoring model that could generate scores for a broader segment of the population, including those with limited credit histories.
- Offer lenders an alternative to the dominant FICO scoring model, potentially increasing competition in the credit scoring market.

Create a model that could adapt more quickly to changes in consumer credit behavior and economic conditions.

=== Growing Adoption and Recognition ===
Since its introduction, VantageScore has seen increasing adoption among lenders and financial institutions. Several factors have contributed to its growing popularity:

- Consistent scoring across bureaus: VantageScore's ability to provide more consistent scores across the three major credit bureaus has appealed to both lenders and consumers.
- Inclusion of alternative data: VantageScore models, particularly in later versions, have incorporated alternative data sources, allowing scores to be generated for consumers with limited traditional credit histories.
- Regulatory recognition: In 2019, the Federal Housing Administration (FHA) approved the use of VantageScore for FHA-insured mortgages, marking a significant milestone in the model's acceptance.
- Consumer accessibility: Many free credit score services provide consumers with VantageScore credit scores, increasing its visibility and familiarity among the general public.

=== Market Share and Industry Impact ===
While exact market share figures are not publicly disclosed, industry reports suggest that VantageScore has made significant inroads in various sectors of the lending industry:

- Credit card issuers: Many major credit card companies have adopted VantageScore for various aspects of their underwriting processes.
- Auto lending: VantageScore has gained traction in the auto lending sector, with several large auto lenders incorporating it into their credit decisions.
- Fintech and online lending: Many fintech companies and online lenders have embraced VantageScore, particularly due to its ability to score consumers with thin credit files.
- Mortgage lending: The recent FHFA mandate (discussed in a later section) is expected to significantly increase VantageScore's presence in the mortgage lending industry.

== VantageScore vs FICO score ==
VantageScore and FICO are competitors, and FICO was not involved with the creation of VantageScore's formula. VantageScore, FICO and the credit bureaus have allowed the public to know some information about the credit score categories and the corresponding calculation weights. FICO allows consumers to get their generic or classic FICO score for Experian, TransUnion, and Equifax through the myFICO website. Consumers can get their VantageScores from free credit report websites, and TransUnion and Experian offer VantageScores to consumers for a fee through their websites. In contrast with FICO's credit scoring models, which are custom-built for each of the three national credit bureaus, to accommodate structural differences in the bureaus' databases, VantageScore model design allows a single model to operate on all three bureaus' data. VantageScore Solutions holds several patents on processes that ensure pieces of data within each bureau's consumer database will be treated identically, regardless of differences in database structure. These methods eliminate much, but not all, discrepancy in VantageScore scores obtained at the same time from different credit bureaus. Some variation is unavoidable because factors such as the timing of lenders' payment-information reports can mean the contents of a given consumer's credit file will differ somewhat at each of the three credit bureaus. Important differences between the VantageScore and FICO algorithms include:

FICO scores require having at least one account that has been open for six months or more and has been reported to the credit bureaus within the prior six months, whereas the VantageScore can be issued from just one month's credit history and with just one account reported within the prior two years. VantageScore thus captures consumers with little or thin credit histories; tax liens are weighed less heavily in VantageScore® 4.0 than in FICO scores; When a credit inquiry is made at one of the credit bureaus, it negatively impacts credit scores. Current versions of the FICO score treat multiple credit inquiries made within a 45-day period as if they were a single inquiry for scoring purposes (though some older versions of the FICO score restrict this to 14 days), but only if they are for the same type of loan. VantageScore counts multiple inquiries within a 14-day period as if they were a single inquiry, even if the inquiries are made for different types of loans. The older FICO 8 score, which is still often used as of 2020, treated medical debt like any other unpaid debt for scoring purposes; medical debt has less impact than other unpaid debt in the newer FICO 9 score and VantageScore 3.0 and forward.

== VantageScore Models ==
VantageScore has released several versions of its credit scoring model since its inception in 2006. Each new version aims to improve the model's predictive power and adapt to changing credit landscapes.

=== VantageScore 1.0 (2006) ===
The original VantageScore model, introduced in March 2006, used a scale range of 501 to 990 and assigned letter grades to various score bands.

=== VantageScore 2.0 (2010) ===
Released in 2010, this version maintained the 501-990 scale and letter grade system of its predecessor. According to TransUnion, the letter grades corresponded to the following score ranges:

A: 900–990
B: 800–899
C: 700–799
D: 600–699
F: 501–599

=== VantageScore 3.0 (2013) ===
VantageScore 3.0, released in 2013, marked a significant change by adopting a scale of 300 to 850. This change aligned VantageScore with the scale range used by FICO models, making it easier for consumers to understand and for lenders to implement.

=== VantageScore 4.0 (2017) ===
VantageScore 4.0, released in mid-2017, introduced several significant updates:

Reduced weight for medical accounts in collections compared to non-medical collection accounts. Exclusion of paid collection accounts from score calculation. Introduction of trended data analysis, examining a consumer's credit utilization rates over time rather than just the most recent billing cycle.

As of 2024, Synchrony Bank uses VantageScore 4.0 as the credit score for granting its credit cards.

=== VantageScore 5.0 (2025) ===
VantageScore 5.0, released in April 2025, utilizes new attributes and consumer loan data from 2021–2023 to assess creditworthiness. The model looks at 24 months of credit data trends and predictions for individual accounts to understand current credit habits and past patterns, with the goal of improving how well it can predict creditworthiness.

== Adoption in Mortgage Lending ==
The Federal Housing Finance Agency (FHFA) has allowed the use VantageScore 4.0 for mortgages sold to Fannie Mae and Freddie Mac, beginning in the first quarter of 2026. This includes all loans guaranteed by these Government Sponsored Enterprises (GSEs), which make up the majority of residential mortgages. Only Rocket and United Wholesale Mortgage can use VantageScore 4.0 as of May 2026

=== Credit Inclusion and Alternative Data ===
VantageScore 4.0's adoption in mortgage lending represents a significant advancement in addressing credit invisibility through the incorporation of alternative data sources. The model considers rental history, utility payments, and telecommunications payments in credit score calculations, providing scoring opportunities for consumers previously excluded from traditional credit evaluation methods. This approach particularly benefits renters who maintain consistent housing payment records but may lack extensive traditional credit histories.

The model's ability to score approximately 33 million additional consumers compared to conventional credit scoring models has significant implications for mortgage accessibility. More than 10 million of these newly scoreable consumers have credit scores of 620 and above, potentially making them eligible for mortgage products.

=== Implementation and Market Impact ===
In July 2025, FHFA Director William J. Pulte announced the immediate implementation of VantageScore 4.0 acceptance by Fannie Mae and Freddie Mac, allowing lenders to use the scoring model while maintaining existing tri-merge credit reporting infrastructure. This decision ended what industry analysts described as FICO's decades-long monopoly in Government-Sponsored Enterprise lending.

The implementation is projected to enable up to $1 trillion in additional high-quality mortgage lending activity and help an estimated five million Americans qualify for homeownership, including veterans and prospective buyers in rural communities. The change allows Americans to use rental payment history as qualifying criteria for mortgage applications, expanding credit history beyond traditional credit cards and loans.

== Future Developments ==
As the credit scoring landscape continues to evolve, VantageScore is likely to face both opportunities and challenges:

Increased competition with FICO, particularly in the mortgage lending sector. Potential for further incorporation of alternative data sources to enhance predictive power and inclusivity. Adaptation to changing consumer credit behaviors, particularly in light of economic shifts and technological advancements. Ongoing regulatory scrutiny and potential changes in credit reporting practices.

== See also ==
- Alternative data
- Comparison of free credit report websites
- Criticism of credit scoring systems in the United States
