= MicroBilt Corporation =

American credit reporting company

MicroBilt
- Type: Private company
- Industry: Financial services
- Founded: 1978; 48 years ago
- Headquarters: Kennesaw, Georgia, United States
- Area served: United States and others
- Products: Credit history
- Number of employees: 185 (2022)
- Subsidiaries: Connect (previously known as PRBC)
- Website: www.microbilt.com

MicroBilt Corporation is an American credit reporting company and alternative credit data provider. Since its founding in 1978, it has grown by acquisition to challenge its larger rivals.

Its Connect consumer credit subsidiary offers consumers the ability to self-report on the bill paying habits as a means of positively impacting their credit score.

MicroBilt’s other subsidiaries focus on business credit and services to sub-prime lenders. Many of the company's products are designed to help businesses accurately assess risk on consumers who otherwise have thin traditional credit files. In doing so, credit can be extended to consumers where it couldn't before opening a new customer base to a company and new opportunities to a consumer.

== History ==
The company was founded in 1978. It has grown through acquisition that included:

- 2002 – MergTech assets
- 2004 – incorporated MicroBilt Merchant Services and MicroBilt Financial Services
- 2005 – Profit Systems Software, Credit Data Systems Inc, Eclectic Data Systems Inc.
- 2005 – incorporated ComplyTraq LLC incorporated
- 2008 – acquired PRBC
- 2010 – incorporated MicroBilt UK Ltd
- 2010 – acquired CL Verify ("CLV"), formerly DP Bureau, a leading supplier of credit-related information to short term lenders

As a holding company, MicroBilt Corporation began to attract significant earnings coverage by 1987.

In 2014, the NY Times, in reporting on the limited use of on-time rental-payments by other major Credit Reporting Agencies, mentions that "MicroBilt... provides services including alternative credit reporting" and how "MicroBilt's data is used to generate FICO Expansion Scores, which are used for consumers who don't qualify for a traditional FICO score."

In July 2026, MicroBilt Corporation filed for Chapter 11 bankruptcy protection.

== Products ==
MicroBilt offers a range of data products and services to lenders, originations and underwriting through collections and debt recovery. The products are available as APIs and through custom web portals. Among the company’s best-known products are:

- iPreview – Verification solution, offering a refined ‘first look’ at application data for lenders and financial services companies to prescreen leads.
- iPredict Advantage – An automated decisioning platform that uses traditional and alternative credit data to assess consumer risk during lending assessments.
- Risk Verification Database (‘rVd’) – A prescreening product used to verify consumer identity and banking information in advance of lending and other business transactions.
- Instant Bank Verification (‘IBV’) – A consumer financial data aggregator used to assess a consumer’s ability to repay a loan.
- Bank Account Verify Advantage (‘BAV’) – A tool that helps lenders reduce underwriting risk by using a consumer’s reported banking and loan history together to more precisely identify qualified borrowers to better predict loan payment default.
- MLA – Assess special requirements under the Military Lending Act (MLA) mandates for lenders extending credit to military personnel, their family members and dependents.

== Services ==
- MicroBilt Merchant Services - are merchant services accredited by Visa. This subsidiary also supports remote deposit.
- MicroBilt Financial Services - was incorporated in 2004 and acquired several companies in 1994, 1995 and 1996. It used the name MicroBilt Financial Services Division on an interim basis. Some of their software products were internally developed and others were purchased.
- Microbilt Connect - was incorporated in 2002 as Pay Rent, Build Credit which was subsequently shortened to PRBC. PRBC's Unique selling proposition is letting individuals detail their creditworthiness using verifiable data that is not used by the other major credit reporting agencies. Initial success factors included that individuals could self-register, and recognition by Fannie Mae, Freddie Mac, and Citimortgage. MicroBilt acquired PRBC in 2008 and has continued to develop it, and released a major line extension in 2012. To the public at large, PRBC is MicroBilt's most visible offering. A year after the 2008 acquisition, some attention was attained with their tag line “Personal info we’ve got to protect, because you know we don't want identify theft” rap. In 2020, the business unit was renamed Microbilt Connect.
- CL Verify - provides identity verification and payday loan history reporting, it was acquired in 2010 from DP Bureau They compete with Teletrack, which is known for its consumer credit database used by sub-prime lenders and payday lenders. Somewhat prior to this acquisition, CL Verify had launched a Skip tracing service.

== Books using MicroBilt data ==
Several books have used data from MicroBilt in their research.

- Understanding Business Valuation: A Practical Guide to Valuing Small ...
- How to Sell a Business for the Most Money, Third Edition
- Valuing Professional Practices and Licenses – Pages 7–57

== Sponsorship ==
MicroBilt began sponsoring a sports team in 2014 with the sponsoring of Ronnie Stewart in the AMA Motocross Championship.

== See also ==
- Credit score in the United States
- FICO
