= Credit Karma =

American multinational personal finance company

Credit Karma, Inc.
- Type: Subsidiary
- Industry: Personal finance, Software, Financial technology
- Founded: March 8, 2007; 19 years ago
- Founders: Kenneth Lin; Ryan Graciano; Nichole Mustard
- Headquarters: Oakland, California, U.S.
- Products: Credit scores; Credit reports; Credit monitoring
- Revenue: $500 million (2017, estimated)
- Number of employees: 1,500
- Parent: Intuit
- Website: creditkarma.com

Credit Karma is an American multinational personal finance company founded in 2007. It has been a brand of Intuit since December 2020. It is best known as a free credit and financial management platform, but its features also include monitoring of unclaimed property databases and a tool to identify and dispute credit report errors. The company operates in the United States, Canada and the United Kingdom.

All of Credit Karma's services are free to consumers. Credit Karma earns revenue from lenders, who pay the company when Credit Karma successfully recommends customers to the lenders.

== History ==
Credit Karma was co-founded in 2007 by Ryan Graciano, Nichole Mustard, and Kenneth Lin, who previously founded Multilytics Marketing. The website went live in February 2008. Early investors included Chris Larson, CEO of Prosper, and Mark Lefanowicz, former president of E-Loan.

In November 2009, Credit Karma closed a $2.5 million Series A funding round led by QED Investors, with participation from SV Angel, Felicis Ventures and Founders Fund. By 2013, the company secured $30 million in Series B funding led by Ribbit Capital and Susquehanna Growth Equity.

In March 2014, Credit Karma raised $85 million in Series C financing, led by CapitalG, with contributions from Tiger Global Management and existing investors. The company followed that with $75 million in follow on funding in September 2014 from CapitalG, Tiger Global Management and Susquehanna Growth Equity.

As of 2015, Credit Karma had raised $368.5 million in financing, at a valuation of $3.5 billion. By December 2015, the company acquired mobile notifications app developer Snowball for an undisclosed amount.

In 2016, Credit Karma acquired money reclamation service Claimdog. In December 2016, Credit Karma acquired AFJC Corporation, owner of OnePriceTaxes.com, to accelerate its entry into the tax preparation market. The company then opened offices in Los Angeles and Charlotte, North Carolina.

In May 2017, Credit Karma launched Unclaimed Money in seven U.S. states. This product aims to help users find unclaimed money, such as unclaimed refunds and insurance payouts.

In March 2018, Credit Karma acquired personal finance company Penny for an undisclosed amount. In August, it acquired mortgage platform Approved for an undisclosed amount.

In May 2019, Credit Karma expanded into the United Kingdom by acquiring Noddle, a credit reporting service, from TransUnion.

In December 2020, Intuit acquired Credit Karma for approximately $7.1 billion. The acquisition faced delays due to a DOJ antitrust lawsuit. To address these concerns, Credit Karma agreed to divest its free tax preparation service, Credit Karma Tax, which competed directly with Intuit's TurboTax product.

That same month, Credit Karma announced that it was moving its headquarters from San Francisco to Oakland.

In August 2021, Credit Karma reached an agreement with NBA franchise Houston Rockets to have the company's name appear on the team's jerseys beginning in the 2021 season.

In September 2022, the Federal Trade Commission (FTC) ordered Credit Karma to pay its users $3 million for "false claims" that impacted their credit scores. Nearly one-third of pre-approved users who applied for credit cards were eventually denied following a credit check. Credit Karma reached a settlement with the FTC and stated that the company is paid only when users are approved for products like credit cards.

In November 2023, Intuit announced that the financial service Mint would be shut down and integrated with Credit Karma in January 2024.

A May 2025 Fox Business article highlighted the Southwest Public Policy Institute’s study "Swipe Right". The report found that platforms like Credit Karma, NerdWallet, and LendingTree expand access to credit by helping consumers compare financial products more effectively.

== Products and services ==
Credit Karma provides free credit scores and credit reports in the United States, Canada and United Kingdom from national credit bureaus TransUnion and Equifax, alongside daily credit monitoring from TransUnion. Unlike Equifax and Experian, Credit Karma are also a credit broker.

Credit Karma also provides identity theft protection and credit tools, such as a Credit Score Simulator which simulates the effect of potential financial actions on a user's credit score; and tailored recommendations for credit cards and personal loans.

Credit Karma Tax, its free United States tax filing service, was announced in December 2016. Credit Karma Tax does not participate in the Free File Alliance, and so is not bound by its requirements to restrict eligibility for free filing. In November 2020, Square, Inc. announced it was acquiring Credit Karma Tax for $50 million and would make it a part of its Cash App unit.

== See also ==
- Credit score in the United States
- Comparison of free credit monitoring services
