= Credit scorecards =

Tool used to assess customers for creditworthiness

A credit score is a numerical expression representing the creditworthiness of an individual. A credit score is primarily based on a credit report, information typically sourced from credit bureaus.

Lenders, such as banks and credit card companies, use credit scores to evaluate the potential risk posed by lending money to consumers and to mitigate losses due to bad debt. Lenders use credit scores to determine who qualifies for a loan, at what interest rate, and what credit limits. Lenders also use credit scores to determine which customers are likely to bring in the most revenue.

Credit scoring is not limited to banks. Other organizations, such as mobile phone companies, insurance companies, landlords, and government departments employ the same techniques. Digital finance companies such as online lenders also use alternative data sources to calculate the creditworthiness of borrowers.

== Characteristics of scorecards ==
Scorecards are built and optimized to evaluate the credit file of a homogeneous population (e.g. files with delinquencies, files that are very young, files that have very little information). Most empirically derived credit scoring systems have between 10 and 20 variables. Application scores tend to be dominated by credit bureau data which typically amounts to over 80% of the predictive power compared to 60% in the late 1980s for UK scorecards. Indeed, there has been an increasing trend to minimize applicant or non-verifiable variables from scorecards, resulting in the reliance on credit bureau data.

Credit scores usually range from 300 to 850 showing the customer's creditworthiness. A customer with a high credit score shows that they are creditworthy and banks will have no problem giving them a loan. If a customer has a low credit score then banks would be hesitant to give out a loan and if they do it might be with a higher interest rate.

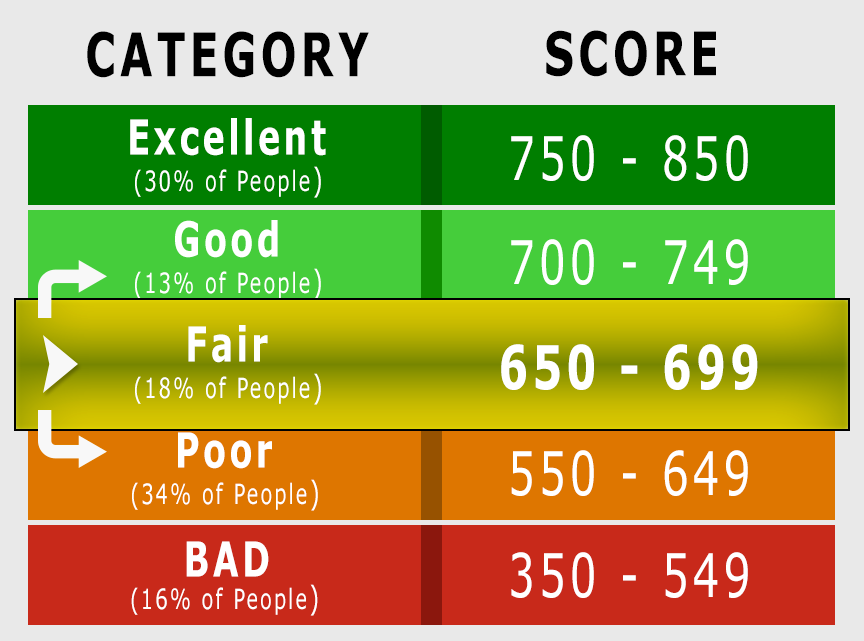
Credit score card ranging from 350-800

Credit scoring typically uses observations or data from clients who defaulted on their loans plus observations on a large number of clients who have not defaulted. Statistically, estimation techniques such as logistic regression or probit are used to create estimates of the probability of default for observations based on this historical data. This model can be used to predict the probability of default for new clients using the same observation characteristics (e.g. age, income, house owner). The default probabilities are then scaled to a "credit score." This score ranks clients by riskiness without explicitly identifying their probability of default.

There are a number of credit scoring techniques such as hazard rate modeling, reduced form credit models, the weight of evidence models, linear or logistic regression. The primary differences involve the assumptions required about the explanatory variables and the ability to model continuous versus binary outcomes. Some of these techniques are superior to others indirectly estimating the probability of default. Despite much research from academics and industry, no single technique has been proven superior for predicting default in all circumstances.

A typical mistaken belief about credit scoring is that the only trait that matters is whether you have actually made payments on time as well as satisfied your monetary obligations in a prompt way. While payment background is essential, however, it still just composes just over one-third of the credit rating score. Furthermore, the repayment background is only shown in your credit history.

One of the major areas of income for banks is the lending business and these loans can be secured or unsecured. Banks would not want to give credit to customers or businesses that will not be able to repay the loan in the future. The process of scoring an applicant based on their creditworthiness determines who should get credit and by how much. This is where credit scorecards come into play which helps banks and financial situations minimize risk and less the delinquency rate.

== Modelling methods ==
The methodologies that are used to create a credit scorecard broadly fall under two categories namely a statistical-based method and an artificial intelligence/machine learning method.

=== Statistical based credit scoring model ===
Models which are usually less complex and whose output can be easily interpreted fall under this category. Simple techniques like Logistic regression, linear regression, and decision trees are some examples of simple statistical techniques. Many banks prefer this category because if a customer is denied a loan then a reason for denial needs to be given and that can be easily interpreted from these models.

=== Artificial intelligence/machine learning based credit scoring model ===
The techniques used here are broadly called black boxes in the analytics world because interpreting them is difficult. Banks generally use this type of scoring model for upselling or cross-selling different products of a bank to its customers. These techniques usually outperform the statistical-based credit scoring models but fall behind because of their interpretability issues.

== Types of Scorecards ==
Application Scorecard - This is used when a customer applies for a new loan. This type of scorecard predicts if a customer will default on the loan. Here the type of data that is used mainly comes from historical loan applications and if the customer has any existing loan then that data is extracted from one of the credit bureaus. If for example, the product that is getting launched is new then in that case data is taken is credit bureaus. This type of scorecard helps the business to make automated, accurate, and consistent decisions on whether to approve, review or decline an applicant. Some of the advantages of this type of scorecard are that the organization can automate the whole decision-making process which in turn reduces the turnaround time of the underwriting process. It also provides the business to make data-backed and accurate decisions.

Behavioral Scorecard - This is used in predicting if an existing customer who has a loan is going to default. Here the data includes the customer's transactional details as well as Bureau-related information. This type of scorecard is also used as an alternate credit score for internal purposes of the institute along with the credit score obtained from the credit bureau. This type of scorecard is also used for identifying the bank's most valuable customers.

Collection Scorecard - This is used to predict customers' responses to different strategies for collecting owed money. The data involved here is similar to the Behavioural scorecard. When a bank decides to lend credit to its customers or if they decide to extend credit to its existing customers, they would need to assess the probability of those customers being able to comfortably repay the loan amount. Here it is important to consider that customers' circumstances may also change over time and to maintain a good relationship with their clients, the bank would need to offer appropriate support. It is important for the organization to identify and prioritize the accounts that need collections because it plays a vital role in controlling bad debt. Deciding the frequency and channel for communication can become difficult in creating a balance in treating customers fairly. This scorecard helps in identifying customers who require less interaction. Some of the advantages of using collection scorecards are creating a streamlined and efficient collection process, the ability to offer a better customer experience without hurting sentiments, and improving recovery rates.

== Developments in credit scoring ==
Naeem Siddiqi discusses some important points regarding the increased use of scorecards and processes that were used in the past vs now.

Some points that increased the use of scorecards include:

- Increase in the level of regulations by governing bodies.
- Open source and better software for developing scorecards
- Increase in information/educational material on the internet.
- The ability to create a customized customer experience.
- Improvement in hardware and processing power over the years.

=== Traditional Approach ===
File sourcing will include a collection of all physical documents from the customer. Documents like bank statements, income tax documents, etc. would be first collected. The loan officer would take all these documents and do a judgmental evaluation. All the documents would then be manually verified. Someone from the bank would need to go to customer's specified location to verify if the person actually lives there and in this context would also discuss the credit with them. In the past, there were no credit Bureaus or credit scorecards because of which the entire process of decision making was done manually. Because of this process, the loan officer would take more time in completing loan applications which would in turn reduce the turnaround time for completion.

=== Present Approach ===
These days all the file sourcing or paperwork required needs to be submitted online on the bank's web portal. No more physical papers as everything is digital. These files are usually PDFs. Previously, income assessments were done manually by a loan officer. Nowadays, there is software that reads the customers' banks statements and automatically verifies their income. The digital customer profile is also checked instead of field visits. There can be a lot of information available about the customer because of the presence of credit Bureaus. If the customer has some kind of banking history that can be obtained from the Bureau. Credit scorecard models are used to accept or reject the customer's loan application. The customer will be able to see their decision online on the web portal itself. Since most of the decision-making process is now online, many more applications can be processed increasing the turnaround time.

== See also ==
- Credit score
- Criticism of credit scoring systems in the United States
- Consumer credit risk
- Credit risk
- Credit bureaus:
  - Major US Bureaus: Dun & Bradstreet • Equifax • Experian • TransUnion
  - Major Canadian Bureaus: Equifax • TransUnion
  - Major UK Bureaus: Equifax • Experian • TransUnion
  - Major Indian Bureaus: CIBIL • Equifax • Experian • Highmark
