= Market-implied rating =

A market-implied rating estimates the market observed default probability of an individual, corporation, or even a country. Indeed, a credit rating is simply a probability of default. The methodology used by Moodys consists in a median piecewise fit of the ratings to the credit default swap data observed on the market. S&P however uses a log regression between the log cds and the ratings equivalent number, adjusted to firm specifics, continent, and outlook.

== See also ==
- Alternative data
- Credit risk
- Default (finance)
- Credit history
- Credit score
- Risk-based pricing
