= Credit report monitoring =

Credit report monitoring or company tracking is the monitoring of one's credit history in order to detect any suspicious activity or changes. Companies offer such service on a subscription basis, typically granting regular access to one's credit history, alerts of critical changes to one's credit history, and additional services. Credit monitoring can help detect credit related fraud and identity theft.

In the United States, whenever obtaining one's credit history, or credit monitoring, such services are typically available either as single-bureau service (with data access to only one of the 3 national credit reporting bureaus), or three-bureau service (with access to data to all three national credit reporting bureaus). It is often advisable to see data with all three bureaus (Equifax, Experian and TransUnion) to detect identity theft.

In Canada, credit monitoring is provided by Equifax and TransUnion, Canada’s two major credit bureaus. In addition to a free credit report and score, Equifax have a premium credit reporting service called Equifax Complete Premier, which lets you see your updated credit report and credit score daily, with alerts and ID protection tools. Likewise, TransUnion provide a premium credit reporting service with similar features.

In the United Kingdom, the Big Three credit agencies all offer this service as well as smaller bureaus. The activities mentioned are usually the filing of latest accounts, board appointments and resignations, share capital amendments, change of company name or Registered Office address, CCJs and changes to the credit rating.

Companies providing credit monitoring will typically alert the consumer to important activity such as credit inquiries, public records, delinquencies, negative information, employment changes, new accounts and other changes to one's credit history. Most people get little benefit from paying for regular credit reporting.

== See also ==
- Business credit monitoring
- Comparison of free credit report websites
