= Noddle (credit report service) =

Former British credit report service

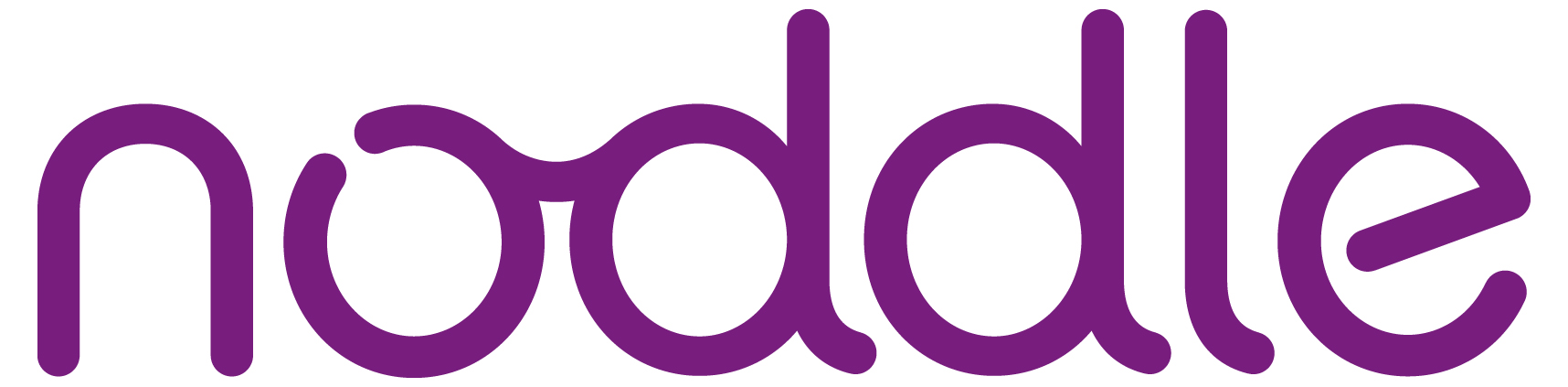
- Website type: Credit report service
- Owner: Credit Karma
- Website: www.noddle.co.uk
- Registration: Yes
- Launched: December 2011; 14 years ago
- Current status: Defunct April 2019; 7 years ago

Noddle was a credit report service offered by the British arm of American company TransUnion (formerly CallCredit). The business was launched in 2011 and was sold to Credit Karma in 2019.

== History ==
In June 2011, 10,000 people were invited to test the service prior to its full launch later that year.

In November 2018, Credit Karma said it would acquire Noddle from TransUnion. At the time, the company had 35 employees and four million users. The acquisition closed in April 2019 and the Noddle brand was replaced with Credit Karma branding.

== Products ==
The service advertised that its clients were able to view a full credit report free for life, unlike the similar paid-for services (Note: In the past, a user had to pay a £2 fee to review a single copy of their statutory credit report. Alternatively, a user could pay a monthly subscription to receive monthly copies of the report.) from rivals Equifax and Experian. (Note: TransUnion (formerly Callcredit), the third-largest credit reference agency in the UK, as of 2011 was surpassed in size by Equifax and Experian.) Noddle charged for extra services such as Noddle Improve, which told users how to improve their credit scores, and Noddle Web Watch, which scanned websites looking for fraudulent uses of users' information and warning users about anything that appeared awry.

If clients saw any discrepancies in their reports, they had to dispute issues with the pertinent reference agency.
