= Business credit reports =

Business credit reports are reports that show the credit history of a business. They are usually created by credit bureaus when a credit grantor reports information related to a business credit account. These reports are typically used during the decision-making process to decide whether or not to grant credit to a business. They are similar to consumer credit reports but focus specifically on the business sector.

There are many credit management companies that specialize in business credit reports. These reports are generated by various credit bureaus such as D&B, Experian, Equifax. These credit management companies are in the business of gathering the most predictive information on individuals and companies beforehand in order to assure that a company that has an interest in providing credit to another company or individual will have less worries on whether or not they will get paid and will not have to concern themselves with the risk associated with not knowing the borrowers history.

Other uses of this report are to assess the risk in extending loans to businesses, insuring businesses, underwriting insurance risk, purchasing businesses, investing in businesses or even company directors.

== Report generation ==
Credit management companies that specialize in offering business credit reports typically provide precise information about business credit that's available today, saving time, money and ensuring a sound and informed credit decision. This is in addition to companies who also provide consumer reports.

Some notable business credit bureaus are Equifax, Dun & Bradstreet, and Experian. While the credit bureaus provide reports and information to companies. Organizations like Corporate Credit Score specialize in providing information and tools to business owners. So they can track their own business credit history and dispute the bureau reports if a mistake has been made.

== Usage ==
Credit management teams at lending organisations review and analyze the business credit reports before extending credit to customers.

In the United States the first step for a business owner who wants to establish a business credit report is to get an Employer Identification Number (EIN) from the United States IRS. This allows them to apply for a business credit accounts with vendors. If the vendors report the credit information to the credit bureaus, tradelines will be created a business credit report. For new businesses, this can take some time.

If credit grantors use a Paydex Score in determining whether or not to grant credit to a business, they will usually want to see a score of 75 or better.

== See also ==
- Accounts receivable
- Business credit monitoring
- Credit report
- Credit management
- Credit control
- Debt collection
