= PRBC =

PRBC may refer to:

- Packed red blood cells
- PRBC (company): a company
