= Nichole Mustard =

Nichole Mustard is an American tech entrepreneur known for co-founding the platform Credit Karma in 2007.

== Early life and education ==
Nichole Mustard was born in Coldwater, Ohio. She attended Miami University. She attended school to pursue her education in zoology but soon realized that is not what she wanted to pursue.

== Career ==
Before she became one of the co-founders of Credit Karma, Nichole worked as a trainee at Pizza Hut. Soon after Pizza Hut, Mustard received her certification in financial planning. She then met her girlfriend with whom she started making a life, got married, and created a family of their own. Shortly afterward, Mustard sold their family home and invested some of that money in the company as a startup.

Mustard co-founded Credit in 2007 with Ryan Graciano and Kenneth Lin., and was also the chief revenue officer. Mustard stepped down from her roles at Credit Karma in December of 2023. Mustard is a self made millionaire whose net worth was $510 million USD in 2024, according to Forbes.
