= BNI =

BNI may refer to:

== Organizations ==
- Banco Nacional de Investimento, the national development bank of Mozambique
- Bank Negara Indonesia, Indonesian national bank
- Bonneville Nationals Inc., sister organization to the Southern California Timing Association (SCTA-BNI)
- Boone Newspapers, Incorporated
- Bureau of National Investigations, the external and internal intelligence agency of Ghana
- Burlington Northern Santa Fe Corporation, by NYSE ticker code
- Burma News International, a Burmese news network
- Barrow Neurological Institute, a US neurological disease treatment and research institution

== Transportation ==
- Barnes Bridge railway station, by National Rail station code
- Britten-Norman Islander, a two engine aircraft
- Nikolassee railway station, by DB station code
- Benin Airport, by IATA code

== Other uses ==
- Bankruptcy Navigator Index
- British Nursing Index, a bibliographic database for nursing and midwifery literature
