= Metro 2 format =

Metro 2 is a data specification created by the United States Consumer Data Industry Association (CDIA) for credit reporting data furnishers (who are members of the credit bureau with a data furnishing service agreement) to report consumers' credit history information to major credit bureaus electronically and in a standardized format. It is implemented in credit reporting software packages. The specification is extensive and is designed to standardize a wide range of credit history information while complying with federal laws and regulations in credit reporting (such as accommodating consumer disputes and disputed status of information).

In 2022, the CDIA defeated an antitrust case in the United States District Court for the Southern District of New York, which claimed that it was exercising monopolistic control over credit reporting procedures by requiring the use of the Metro 2 data format.
