= Kenneth Lin =

Kenneth Lin or Ken Lin may refer to:

- Kenneth Lin (playwright), playwright and screenwriter
- Kenneth Lin (entrepreneur), founder and CEO of Credit Karma
