= Loss run =

A loss run is a document that records the history of claims made against a commercial insurance policy. It is analogous to a credit report. A loss run report will include information including the date of the claim, the amount paid, and a description of the event. Generally, a loss run will record 5 years of history. Because of the importance of loss run reports in underwriting commercial insurance accounts, most American states have laws requiring insurance providers to make these reports available on request.

A loss run can, in principle, also be used to notify an insurer of a claim, although this has been disputed.
