= Kikoff =

American credit-building fintech company

- Type: Private company
- Industry: Financial technology
- Founded: 2019; 7 years ago
- Founder: Cynthia Chen and Christophe Chong
- Headquarters: San Francisco, United States
- Area served: United States
- Number of employees: 140 (2025)
- Website: kikoff.com

Kikoff is a San Francisco-based fintech company that helps its users in the United States build and improve their credit.

Kikoff provides users with an interest- and penalty-free revolving line of credit, used to make financial literacy purchases from its online store. Payments toward the line of credit are reported to the major credit bureaus to help establish or improve users' credit and build a positive payment history.

Services also include credit monitoring, subscription management, and financial literacy information.

== History ==
Kikoff was co-founded in 2019 by Cynthia Chen, former Chief Risk Officer for Figure Technology Solutions and Christophe Chong, former head of growth at Lime. Chen also held senior executive roles at Capital One, and OnDeck Capital.

Lightspeed Venture Partners led the Series A funding round which raised $12.5 million. In June 2021, the company closed a $30 million Series B funding round led by Portage Ventures, also with participation from Lightspeed. Among Kikoff’s other financial backers are Teresa Ressel, former chief financial officer of the US Treasury Department, WEX Inc. CEO Melissa Smith, and NBA player Steph Curry.

As of late 2025, Kikoff employed approximately 140 people and operated offices in San Francisco's South of Market neighborhood. Kikoff reported having 1 million users as of September 2025.

== Legal issues ==
=== Chime ===
In February 2025, Chime Financial filed a trademark infringement lawsuit against Kikoff in the United States District Court for the Northern District of California. The complaint alleges that Kikoff intentionally designed its branding — including its Instagram layout, colors, icons, and marketing language — to resemble Chime's and mislead consumers into believing the two companies were affiliated. The case was voluntarily dismissed by Chime on April 3, 2026.

=== Christophe Chong ===
In 2026, Kikoff co-founder and former chief technology officer Christophe Chong filed a complaint against the company seeking to inspect its books and records, which he says are necessary to value his shares and investigate alleged misconduct by CEO and co-founder Cynthia Chen. He alleges Chen took steps beginning in 2024 to consolidate control over the company's board and operations.

A Kikoff spokesperson said, "While disputes among cofounders of successful businesses are common, the allegations in this lawsuit are meritless."
