= Earl Isaac =

American 20th-century mathematician and entrepreneur

Earl Judson Isaac (August 7, 1921 – December 12, 1983) founded Fair, Isaac and Company along with friend William R. "Bill" Fair in 1956. They began the operation in a small studio apartment on Lincoln Avenue in San Rafael, California.

== Early life and education ==
Earl Isaac was born in Buffalo, New York where he graduated from Riverside High School. The youngest of five children, Earl had two older brothers and two older sisters. He graduated from high school at age 15, attended Muskingum University, then accepted an appointment to the United States Naval Academy at Annapolis, Maryland, for the class of 1944. Because of the outbreak of World War II, he graduated from the Naval Academy in 1943, one year early, and served as a U.S. Naval officer on the USS Missouri. After World War II, Isaac earned a Master of Science degree in Mathematics at University of California, Los Angeles.

== Career ==
After being discharged from the Navy, he worked at SRI International during SRI's beginning years, then known as Stanford Research Institute, along with Bill Fair, his future business partner.

With an initial investment of $400 each (together equivalent to $9,474 in 2025), Isaac and Fair founded Fair, Isaac and Company in 1956, a firm that would provide a creditworthiness scoring system to lenders.
