= Seasoned tradeline =

Line of credit that is at least 2 years old

A seasoned tradeline is a line of credit that the borrower has held open in good standing for a long period of time, typically at least two years. The prefix "seasoned" implies that the account is aged or that it has an established history.

== "Piggybacking" tradelines ==
"Piggybacking" tradelines is a practice involving seasoned tradelines which uses a creditworthy borrower's accounts to improve the credit rating of an unrelated third party.

The creditworthy borrower adds the third party as an authorized user of their lines of credit, but does not actually provide the third party with materials (credit cards, account numbers, etc.) that would permit the third party to make charges against that account.

The benefit to the third party is an improvement in their personal credit rating—their credit score increases. However, this does not change their entire credit record, but merely increases their credit score as a result of the newly added tradeline. This may make the third party look like a better credit risk, and may improve the third party's access to new credit. However, a credit score is only one aspect of the lending process; that is, the borrower must pass all underwriting procedures, which include much more than the credit scores of the borrower.

== Opponents' views ==
Those who oppose the concept of piggybacking would suggest that:

- If the third party is dealing with a lender who uses risk-based pricing, then their artificially inflated credit score may translate into a substantially lower interest rate.
- Artificially modifying credit scores may be considered fraudulent.
- It's one thing to add a friend or a relative, it's another to add a stranger for profit.

== Proponents' views ==
Those who support the concept of piggybacking would suggest, in response:

- Risk-based pricing, relying solely on credit scores, does not truly get at the fundamental "risk" of the applicant. So, the access to lower interest rates is not affected entirely by piggybacking.
- Credit scores are already artificially modified; that is, it is a made-up system. There is no difference between adding an authorized user tradeline and opening a new account; they both affect your credit score.
- Federal law, specifically the Equal Credit Opportunity Act, provides for the addition of authorized user tradeline, without regard for the relationship between the parties.

== Business model ==
1. A company offering the piggybacking service maintains a network of creditworthy "card holders" or "vendors" who stand by ready to add clients to their accounts as authorized users for a fee.
2. A third party, looking to increase their credit score, contacts the company. The company offers a selected tradeline to the client and charges the client a fee per account.
3. The client pays the fee (anywhere from $99.00 to $2,500.00 per tradeline).
4. The company submits the order to the card holder.
5. Once the trade line reports, the company pays the card holder their fee (anywhere from $25.00 to $500.00 per authorized user) and the company keeps the remaining funds as revenue.
6. Each agent of the state that the agency resides in must operate as per the state Credit Repair Organization Act, and must be given a Terms a Service in the individual who has sought out to make such types of agreement(s).

== Legality ==
There is no cut and dried answer regarding the many questions surrounding the legality of piggybacking, however, there are many sources that tend to indicate perhaps a general answer, such as:

- FTC spokesman Frank Dorman said: "What I've gathered from attorneys here is that it is legal."

According to The Fair Issac Co (The creator Of the FICO Score, authorized user accounts are legal and FICO 08 will include authorized user accounts in its credit score calculations. The Fair Issac Co estimates there are approximately 50 million consumers who re-added as authorized users on other peoples accounts.

- A report published by the Federal Reserve Board reported "This is possible because creditors generally have followed a practice of furnishing to credit bureaus information about all authorized users, whether or not the authorized user is a spouse, without indicating which authorized users are spouses and which are not. This practice does not violate Reg. B".
- In a written statement from Fair Isaac Corporation on credit scoring models and credit score before the U.S. House of Representatives Committee on Financial Services, Subcommittee on Oversight and Investigations, Tom Quinn, Vice President of Global Scoring Solutions for Fair Isaac Corporation, stated: "After consulting with the Federal Reserve Board and the Federal Trade Commission earlier this year, Fair Isaac has decided to include consideration of authorized user tradelines present on the credit report..."

== Up front fees ==
While the legality of piggybacking tradelines seems to remain ambiguous, there is a potential clear violation of federal law, if for example, a piggybacking company takes up front fees from their clients.

Section 404 of the Credit Repair Organizations Act (CROA), states:

No credit repair organization may charge or receive any money or other valuable consideration for the performance of any service which the credit repair organization has agreed to perform for any consumer before such service is fully performed.

Although the Federal Law appears to be clear, some States, including Florida, have enacted similar and stricter laws, requiring the use of Trust accounts for client funds and a suretybond of $10,000.00 or more. While this is indeed much stricter, it appears to allow for up front fees if the company is bonded and uses a trust account. For example, Section 817.7005, Florida Statutes states, in relevant part:

...A credit service organization, its salespersons, agents, and representatives, and independent contractors who sell or attempt to sell the services of a credit service organization shall not do any of the following:
(1) Charge or receive any money or other valuable consideration prior to full and complete performance of the services the credit service organization has agreed to perform for the buyer, unless the credit service organization has obtained a surety bond of $10,000 issued by a surety company admitted to do business in this state and has established a trust account at a federally insured bank or savings and loan association located in this state; however, where a credit service organization has obtained a surety bond and established a trust account as provided herein, the credit service organization may charge or receive money or other valuable consideration prior to full and complete performance of the services it has agreed to perform for the buyer but shall deposit all money or other valuable consideration received in its trust account until the full and complete performance of the services it has agreed to perform for the buyer;...

== Piggybacking risks ==
The risk to the "donor" is that the other person might actually make charges against the account, and not pay it back. The brokers who provide this service claim that they do not reveal the entire account number to the recipient, or do not themselves have access to the account number. It is possible a recipient might learn the account number in some other way, for example if it appears on their own credit report. However, this is often insufficient information to make use of the account - a PIN, expiration date, security code or personal identifying information of the primary account holder is typically also required. These measures further lower the risk to the "donor".

== FICO 8 ==
With FICO 8 on the horizon many brokers who used to add “authorized users” to existing credit card accounts have switched to brokering “Seasoned Primary" accounts. A “primary” account is an account in the borrower's own name. This practice is not yet tested in the courts as the lender now has no way of telling your real credit from that of the former owner who had “seasoned the account”. With an authorized user account the credit report clearly marks the account as authorized user; with this new practice, however, the lender is not alerted to the true status of the account history.

Authorized user accounts are legal and will be included into credit scoring; it's a violation of Federal law to not include ALL information in a credit file while calculating a credit score.

One thing is for sure, Federal Law, such as the CROA and the Federal Reserve Board Regulation B, at least indicates a permissible purpose for adding authorized user tradelines.

== Tradeline scams ==
While primarily discussing credit repair, the Federal Trade Commission has written facts for consumers to assist them in avoiding scams.

Some key components of these consumer facts suggest that consumers should:

1. Ensure the company actually exists; check state government records.
2. Ensure the company does not have serious and unresolved complaints against it.
3. Ensure you receive a contract from the company.
4. Ensure the contract contains your rights under federal law.
5. Ensure you have many forms of contact for the company.
