= Credit repair =

Credit repair is the practice of improving or rehabilitating one's financial reputation (creditworthiness) among creditors.

Credit repair often involves requesting credit reports and addressing the problems listed on them. These reports often contain major errors, but incorrect or misleading information and omissions can generally be disputed.

Making arrangements with the creditors to repay them (credit counseling) is a means of credit repair for a person who has outstanding debt. Creditors may accept slow payment schedules or partial repayment, as an alternative to writing off the debt completely.

The process in many countries (including the United States) can be quite complex and time consuming, thus spawning the credit repair industry. Both for-profit and not-for-profit organizations have formed to assist individuals in the credit repair process, always for a fee, though governments have repeatedly increased oversight and regulation of this industry because of predatory practices.

In addition, much self-help information on credit repair is available, designed to allow individuals manage their own credit repair campaign.

== Fraud ==
Many companies offer fraudulent schemes for personal credit repair, offering to wipe out legitimate records and give a person a "clean slate". In many cases, these are either fraudulent scams or schemes which may cause a person attempting to use them to violate more serious laws.

Such schemes are primarily identified by unrealistic promises, such as the following:

- requiring customers to pre-pay even though the company is not a bank or a non-profit as defined in CROA.
- the company offers to erase bankruptcies from a person's record
- the company offers to erase tax liens from a person's record
- the company offers to issue a person a new Social Security number

== See also ==
- Credit Repair Organizations Act
- Fair Credit Reporting Act
- Identity theft
