= Credit control =

Credit control is the system used by businesses to make sure that credit is given only to borrowers who are likely to be able to repay it. Credit Controllers control lending by calculating and managing risk. A Credit Controller oversees all debts owed to a company from existing creditors and manages requests for new credit. They would use business credit reports or other means to assess whether to continue or extend credit to a customer.

As the creditworthiness of a counterparty can change, credit control adjust the amount of credit that the company is willing to extend over time.

== Overview ==
Credit control is part of the financial controls that are employed by businesses particularly in manufacturing to ensure that once sales are made they are realised as cash or liquid resources.

Credit control is a critical system of control that prevents the business from becoming illiquid due to improper and un-coordinated issuance of credit to customers. Credit control has a number of sections that include - credit approval, credit limit approval, dispatch approvals as well as collection process.

In a large business a credit process will be run by a senior manager and will include processes as such as Know Your Customer (KYC), account opening, approval of credit and credit limits (both in terms of the amounts and the terms e.g. 30 Days, 30 Days net), extension of credit and effecting collection action.

Credit control will normally report to the Finance Director or Risk Management Committee.

== Procedures for issuing credit ==
During the selling process a potential customer or even a current customer may request for credit lines to be extended. At this point depending on the size of the company a process such as this may be followed:-

1. Formal application for credit to be extended by the customer entity.
2. The Credit Controller and Risk Manager evaluates the credit requested.
3. Credit Collection period (usually in Days) is considered both as a stand-alone and as a component of the working capital cycle in particular ensuring that it does not exceed the Payables Period (usually in Days too).
4. An external rating agencies may be invoked to assess the risk attached to extending credit to the customer. Usually credit worthiness of a firm may be assessed independently by firms such as Dun & Bradstreet, Bloomberg, AC Nielsen or other reputable firms.
5. An internal evaluation is made considering the risk of Bad or Doubtful Debts against the profit or returns.
6. After Credit Controller, Risk Manager and Finance Director is satisfied credit is extended.
7. An account is opened with the credit setting set for the agreed terms: Cap of credit the customer will enjoy and the terms or duration which they will enjoy that credit. In other words, the time-limit as well as the value of the credit limit.

== Non-collectibility ==
Extended credit could, despite all efforts made, become non-collectable. In this case a professional Debt collection agency may be hired along with attendant legal, court and other fees. This event is normally dreaded and most accountants are reluctant to consider that credit extended has now become non-collectable necessitating a debt write-off if the receivable has gone bust or a provision if only a lower amount can ultimately be collected.

== Risk of credit ==
Unwarranted debt may be a serious strain and could lead to cash flow issues and company failure. During previous credit crunches many businesses experienced serious credit risks and severely curtailed extension of credit to partner firms and businesses. Credit extension remains a key, pivotal role in business management.

== See also ==
- Accounts receivable
- Business credit monitoring
- Business credit reports
- Credit management
- Debt collection
- Director of credit and collections
