= Insurance score =

System for predicting risk in insurance

An insurance score – also called an insurance credit score – is a numerical point system based on select credit report characteristics. There is no direct relationship to financial credit scores used in lending decisions, as insurance scores are not intended to measure creditworthiness, but rather to predict risk. Insurance companies use insurance scores for underwriting decisions, and to partially determine charges for premiums. Insurance scores are applied in personal product lines, namely homeowners and private passenger automobile insurance, and typically not elsewhere.

== Background ==
Insurance scoring models are built from selections of credit report factors, combined with insurance claim and profitability data, to produce numerical formulae or algorithms. A scoring model may be unique to an insurance company and to each line of business (e.g. homeowners or automobile), in terms of the factors selected for consideration and the weighting of the point assignments. As insurance credit scores are not intended to measure creditworthiness, they commonly focus on financial habits and choices (i.e., age of oldest account, number of inquiries in 24 months, ratio of total balance to total limits, number of open retail credit cards, number of revolving accounts with balances greater than 75% of limits, etc.) Therefore it is possible for a consumer with a high financial credit score, and excellent payment history, to receive a poor insurance score. Insurers consider credit report information in their underwriting and pricing decisions as a predictor of profitability and risk of loss.

Various studies have found a strong relationship between credit-based insurance scores and profitability or risk of loss. The scores are generally most predictive when little or no other information exists, such as in the case of clean driving records, or claims-free policies; in instances where past claims, points, or other similar information exist on record, the personal histories will typically be more predictive than the scores. Insurers consider credit report information, along with other factors, such as driving experience, previous claims and vehicle age, to develop a picture of a consumer's risk profile and to establish premium rates. The correlation, between credit-based insurance scores and overall insurance profitability and loss, has not been disputed.

== Support and opposition ==
The use of credit information in insurance pricing and underwriting is heavily disputed. Proponents of insurance credit scoring include insurance companies, the American Academy of Actuaries (AAA), the Insurance Information Institute (III), and credit bureaus such as Fair Isaac and TransUnion. Active opponents include many state insurance departments and regulators, and consumer protection organizations such as the Center for Economic Justice, the Consumer Federation of America, the National Consumer Law Center and Texas Watch. As a result of successful lobbying by the insurance industry, credit scoring is legal in nearly all states. The state of Hawaii has banned all use of credit information in personal automobile underwriting and rating, and other states have established restrictions. A number of states have also made unsuccessful attempts to ban or restrict the practice. The National Association of Insurance Commissioners has acknowledged that a correlation does exist between insurance scores and losses, but asserts that the benefit of credit reports to consumers has not yet been established.

== Public information ==
Insurance credit-scoring models are considered proprietary, and a trade secret, in most cases. The designers wish to protect their models from view for a number of reasons: they may provide competitive advantage in the insurance marketplace, or they anticipate consumers might attempt to alter results, by changing the information they provide, if the computations were common knowledge. Thus there is little public information available about the details of insurance credit-scoring models.

- One actuarial study has been published, The Impact of Personal Credit History on Loss Performance in Personal Lines, by James Monaghan, ACAS MAAA.
- Allstate has published a private passenger automobile credit scoring model, the ISM7 (NI) Scorecard (where "NI" indicates no inquiries are considered).

== Key reports and studies ==
Credit-Based Insurance Scores: Impacts on Consumers of Automobile Insurance, A Report to Congress by the Federal Trade Commission. This study found that insurance credit scores are effective predictors of risk. It also showed that African-Americans and Hispanics are substantially overrepresented in the lowest credit scores, and substantially underrepresented in the highest, while Caucasians and Asians are more evenly spread across the scores. The credit scores were also found to predict risk within each of the ethnic groups, leading the Federal Trade Commission (FTC) to conclude that the scoring models are not solely proxies for redlining. The FTC stated that little data was available to evaluate benefit of insurance scores to consumers. The report was disputed by representatives of the Consumer Federation of America, the National Fair Housing Alliance, the National Consumer Law Center, and the Center for Economic Justice, for relying on data provided by the insurance industry, which was not open to examination.

The Impact of Personal Credit History on Loss Performance in Personal Lines, by James Monaghan ACAS MAAA. This actuarial study matched 170,000 policy records with credit report information to show the correlation between historical loss ratios and various credit report elements.

The Use of Credit History for Personal Lines of Insurance: Report to the National Association of Insurance Commissioners, American Academy of Actuaries Risk Classification Subcommittee of the Property/Casualty Products, Pricing and Market Committee.

Insurers' Use of Credit Scoring for Homeowners Insurance in Ohio: A Report to the Ohio Civil Rights Commission, from Birny Birnbaum, Center for Economic Justice. Birny Birnbaum, Consulting Economist, argues that insurance credit scoring is inherently unfair to consumers and violates basic risk classification principles.

Insurance Credit Scoring: An Unfair Practice, Center for Economic Justice. This report argues that insurance scoring: is inherently unfair; has a disproportionate impact on consumers in poor and minority communities; penalizes consumers for rational behavior and sound financial management practices; penalizes consumers for lenders’ business decisions unrelated to payment history; is an arbitrary practice; and undermines the basic insurance mechanism and public policy goals for insurance.

The Use of Credit Scoring in Automobile and Homeowners Insurance, A Report to the Governor, the Legislature and the People of Michigan, by Frank M. Fitzgerald, Commissioner, Office of Financial and Insurance Services. This report reviewed the viewpoints of the industry, agents, consumers, and other interested parties. In conclusion, insurance credit scoring was found to be within the scope of Michigan law.

Use of Credit Information by Insurers in Texas, Report to the 79th Legislature, Texas Department of Insurance. This study found a consistent pattern of differences in credit scores among different racial/ethnic groups. Whites and Asians were found to have better scores than Blacks and Hispanics. Differences in income levels were not as pronounced as for racial/ethnic groups, but average credit scores at upper income levels were better than those at lower and moderate income levels. The study found a strong relationship between credit scores and claims experience on an aggregate basis. In 2002, the Texas Department of Insurance received a peak of 600 complaints related to credit scoring, which declined and leveled to 300 per year.

Insurance Credit Scoring in Alaska, State of Alaska, Department of Community and Economic Development, Division of Insurance. The study suggested unequal effects on consumers of varying income and ethnic backgrounds. Specifically, the higher income neighborhoods and those with a higher proportion of Caucasians were the least impacted by credit scoring. Although data available for the study was limited, the state of Alaska determined that some restrictions on credit scoring would be appropriate to protect the public.

== Sources ==
- Insurance Information Institute Credit Insurance Fact Sheets
