= Comparison of free credit monitoring services =

The following chart compares websites that provide United States credit reports or credit scores free of charge. Services limited to cardholders or only offering trial plans are excluded. The chart specifies what is free, what kind of credit reports are included, and whether a full Social Security number is needed.

According to the Federal Trade Commission, "AnnualCreditReport.com is the only authorized source for the free annual credit report." Care should be taken when providing a full Social Security number to any other website.

Comparison of free credit monitoring websites
Name	Frequency	Credit bureau(s)	Full SSN required?	Scoring model
AnnualCreditReport.com	Annual full official report (one from each agency)	Equifax, Experian, TransUnion	Yes	No score provided
CreditCards.com by Bankrate	Monthly full report	TransUnion	Last 4 digits only	VantageScore 3.0
CreditWise by Capital One	Daily full report	TransUnion	Yes	FICO 8 Score
CreditWorks Basic by Experian	Daily full report	Experian	Yes	FICO 8 Score
Credit Journey by Chase	Weekly summary	TransUnion	Yes	VantageScore 3.0
Credit Karma	Daily TransUnion & Daily Equifax full reports	TransUnion, Equifax	Sometimes	VantageScore 3.0
Credit Sesame	Monthly summary	TransUnion	Last 4 digits only	VantageScore 3.0
Equifax Core Credit	Monthly summary	Equifax	Last 4 digits only	VantageScore 3.0
FICO Free Credit Score Plan	Monthly summary	Equifax	Yes	FICO 8 Score
LendingTree	Monthly summary	TransUnion	Last 4 digits only	VantageScore 3.0
Mint by Intuit	Monthly summary	TransUnion	Yes	VantageScore 3.0
myBankrate	Monthly full report	TransUnion	Last 4 digits only	VantageScore 3.0
MyCredit Guide by American Express	Weekly full report	Experian	Last 4 digits only	FICO 8 Score
NerdWallet	Weekly full report	TransUnion	Last 4 digits only	VantageScore 3.0
Nav	Every 30 days	Experian and Dun & Bradstreet	Yes	VantageScore 3.0
TransUnion TrueIdentity	Monthly full report	TransUnion	Last 4 digits only	VantageScore 3.0
WalletHub	Daily full report	TransUnion	Last 4 digits only	VantageScore 3.0

== See also ==
- Credit score in the United States
- Criticism of credit scoring systems in the United States
- Fair Credit Reporting Act
