= Consumer credit risk =

The following article is based on UK market; other countries may differ.

Consumer credit risk (also retail credit risk) is the risk of loss due to a consumer's failure or inability to repay (default) on a consumer credit product, such as a mortgage, unsecured personal loan, credit card, overdraft etc. (the latter two options being forms of unsecured banking credit).

== Consumer credit risk management ==
Most companies involved in lending to consumers have departments dedicated to the measurement, prediction and control of losses due to credit risk. This field is loosely referred to consumer/retail credit risk management, however, the word management is commonly dropped.

=== Scorecards ===
A common method for predicting credit risk is through the credit scorecard. The scorecard is a statistically based model for attributing a number (score) to a customer (or an account) which indicates the predicted probability that the customer will exhibit a certain behaviour. In calculating the score, a range of data sources may be used, including data from an application form, from credit reference agencies or from products the customer already holds with the lender.

The most widespread type of scorecard in use is the application scorecard, which lenders employ when a customer applies for a new credit product. The scorecard tries to predict the probability that the customer, if given the product, would become "bad" within a given timeframe, incurring losses for the lender. The exact definition of what constitutes "bad" varies across different lenders, product types and target markets, however, examples may be "missing three payments within the next 18 months" or "default within the next 12 months". The score given to a customer is usually a three or four digit integer, and in most cases is proportional to the natural logarithm of the odds (or logit) of the customer becoming "bad". In general, a low score indicates a low quality (a high chance of going "bad") and a high score indicates the opposite.

Other scorecard types may include behavioural scorecards - which try to predict the probability of an existing account turning "bad"; propensity scorecards - which try to predict the probability that a customer would accept another product if offered one; and collections scorecards - which try to predict a customer's response to different strategies for collecting owed money.

=== Credit strategy ===
Credit strategy is concerned with turning predictions of customer behavior (as provided by scorecards) into a decision whether to accept their business.

To turn an application score into a Yes/No decision, "cut-offs" are generally used. A cut-off is a score at and above which customers have their application accepted and below which applications are declined. The placement of the cut-off is closely linked to the price (annual percentage rate – APR) that the lender is charging for the product. The higher the price charged, the greater the losses the lender can endure and still remain profitable. So, with a higher price the lender can accept customers with a higher probability of going "bad" and can move the cut-off down. The opposite is true of a lower price. Most lenders go further and charge low scoring customers a higher APR than high scoring customers. This compensates for the added risk of taking on poorer quality business without affecting the lender's place in the market with better quality borrowers. In the UK, lenders must advertise a typical rate, which at least 51% of customers must receive.

Application score is also used as a factor in deciding such things as an overdraft or credit card limit. Lenders are generally happier to extend a larger limit to higher scoring customers than to lower scoring customers, because they are more likely to pay borrowings back.

Alongside scorecards lie policy rules which apply regulatory requirements (such as making sure there is no lending to under 18s) and other lending policy (such as many lenders will not lend to customers who have a County Court judgment (CCJ) registered against them).

Credit Strategy is also concerned with the ongoing management of a customer's account, especially with revolving credit products such as credit cards, overdrafts and flexible loans, where the customer's balance can go up as well as down. Behavioural scorecards are used (usually monthly) to provide an updated picture of the credit-quality of the customer/account. As the customer's profile changes, the lender may choose to extend or contract the customer's limits.

=== Underwriting ===
Not all decisions can be made automatically through the methods mentioned above. This may be for a number of reasons; insufficient data, regulatory requirements, or a borderline decision. In such cases highly trained professionals called underwriters manually review the case and make a decision. Sometimes this is done in conjunction with the "cut-offs" mentioned above and the data provided by scoring. This is more common in highly regulated products such as mortgages, especially when large sums are involved.

== See also ==
- Credit scorecards
- Credit risk
