= Connect (financial services company) =

American consumer credit reporting agency

Connect, Inc.
- Type: Corporation
- Industry: Business Services
- Founded: Incorporated in March 2002 as Pay Rent, Build Credit, Inc.
- Headquarters: 1640 Airport Rd. Suite 115; Kennesaw, GA 30144
- Area served: North America
- Key people: Walt Wojciechowski, CEO
- Website: www.microbiltconnect.com

Connect, formerly PRBC, is a consumer credit reporting agency, more commonly referred to as a credit bureau in the United States. It is similar to the other four U.S. credit bureaus (Equifax, Experian, TransUnion and Innovis) in that it is an FCRA (Fair Credit Reporting Act) compliant national data repository. Connect differs in that consumers are able to self-enroll and report their own non-debt payment history, and they can build a positive credit file based on alternative data, such as timely payments for bills including rent, utilities, cable, telephone, and insurance that are not automatically reported to the other bureaus.

The Connect service is offered free of charge. When someone takes out a loan, the lender or merchant will pay a fee to Connect so they can see his or her alternative credit rating.

== Company history ==
Connect was incorporated on March 12, 2002, under the name Pay Rent, Build Credit, Inc. The company name was later shortened to PRBC because all recurring bills and loan payments can be used to build credit, not just rent. PRBC received two initial funding grants from the Ford Foundation in support of the company's mission to build a national data infrastructure that incorporates rental payments into credit reporting to benefit consumers. PRBC also received funding from the Omidyar Network, The Center for Financial Services Innovation and TTV Capital. Initial data subscribers included Fannie Mae, Freddie Mac, and CitiMortgage.

In 2005 and 2006, the National Credit Reporting Association (NCRA) and the National Association of Mortgage Brokers (NAMB) announced separate agreements with PRBC to help educate consumers on how to document their creditworthiness by building a credit history based on their non-debt recurring payments.

In November 2006, PRBC received a patent from the United States Patent and Trademark Office for the company's technology and method for collecting data on commonly recurring bill payments made by individuals and small businesses and incorporating them in a credit file, credit report, and credit score.

In December 2006, Fannie Mae and Freddie Mac acknowledged that PRBC reports comply with standards for establishing the credit reputations of borrowers for loans that can be sold to them.

In March 2007, mortgage insurer Mortgage Guaranty Insurance Corporation (MGIC) announced an agreement to use PRBC Reports with PRBC Bill Payment Score (BPS) to automate their approval decisions for consumers with "thin" or no traditional credit histories.

At the end of 2007, FICO and PRBC announced a partnership to deliver the PRBC Credit Report with FICO Expansion Score, a comprehensive credit risk management tool that U.S. mortgage lenders can use when assessing the risk of applicants who have little or no traditional credit history.

In December 2008, it was announced that PRBC was acquired by MicroBilt Corporation, providing small to medium-sized businesses with the use of alternative data in order to make informed credit decisions.

On September 12, 2012, PRBC launched PRBCMainStreet.com. PRBC MainStreet is intended as a community of businesses that will offer credit to underbanked or credit-underserved consumers by using PRBC's alternative credit reports.

In November 2020, PRBC changed the name to Connect.

In July 2026, parent company MicroBilt Corporation filed for Chapter 11 bankruptcy protection.

== See also ==
- Consumer credit reporting agency
