= Most valuable customers =

Most valuable customers is a marketing term referring to the customers who are the most profitable for a company. These customers buy more or higher-value products as the average customer. The company provide these customers with advice and guidance to establish a more personal relationship.

== Overview ==
Usually, most valuable customers are rewarded with discount or membership cards that give them specific privileges. These rewards help the business to generate more revenue as the customers will purchase more of products/services due to given benefits. Different companies have different ways to reward their loyal customers, for example Vodafone are rewarding their loyal customers with extra data on their plans; or Barclays are lowering the interest rate on loans for customers that have been with them for more than 6 months.

== How to identify most valuable customers ==
Every business has a list of customers who are buying more products from them, comparing to an average buyer (usually referred to as Loyal Customers).

In order to identify the most valuable customers, the business will have to evaluate the customer's value in seven areas:

1. Sales minus cost: Generally, companies rank their customers by judging from the number of sales that the customer does with the company, however this does not always have a positive outcome for the company. Sometimes when a customer purchases a lot of company's products/services, the cost of doing those sales may exceed its value because that cost of sales has to be added to the overall equation.

2. Revenue Timing: not all revenue is created equal. Companies make different revenues at different times. For example, customers are shopping more in the fourth quarter for the holidays due to the bigger sales in shops. Sales that are made in off-peak seasons may be more profitable because they fill unused production capacity or may be done at a slightly higher price.

3. Referrals and buzz: nowadays, consumers tend to trust peer reviews, posts in social networks and tweets more than corporate advertising. If a customer is willing to buzz about a company's products/services, it can be a powerful endorsement.

4. Retention: It is usually cheaper to retain an old customer rather than seeking new ones. A lot of businesses are not bothered that much about the customers that already have purchased its products/services, and they mainly focus on attracting new ones, however a customer who has been with a company over a long time, in general is more profitable, mostly because customer buys the product/service on regular basis and can refer to the company when recommending to family/friends.

5. Add on products or services: Customers that buy many items from the company are more profitable because the cost of acquiring that customer is now spread over a larger sales base.

6. The customer's brand: Customer's brand is mostly valuable for smaller businesses. If a customer is a well known public figure and he/she buys a company's product and talks about it, it boosts the company's popularity.

7. Feedback: The majority of the customers will never tell a company what they honestly think about its product. Usually, only the top 10 percent (very satisfied) and bottom 10 percent(very dissatisfied) share their thoughts about a company's service. Any customer who is willing to share his/her opinion is very valuable for the business.

== The Importance of valuable customers ==
Many businesses use the practice of retaining valuable customers in order to increase financial performance as well as their customer base. The research done by Gartner shows that the 80% of company's profit come from 20% of existing (loyal) customers. This happens because the customers are inclined to come back for a company's product/service if they had a good experience with them before. Also, if the customers were rewarded with discounts for a long-term relationship with a company, they are willing to buy more of the company's products/services.

Valuable customers is also a good marketing aspect for the company. Customers that are staying with a company for long terms are more inclined to share their experience of a business, with their friends, which will work better than expensive advertising because people tend to be more affected by people they are familiar with. This marketing move will strengthen your brand in the minds of people who are unfamiliar with it.

Regular loyal customers can be the key to success aspect in the highly competitive market. If the company builds a strong brand image, which helps to retain valuable customers, then it can make it resistant to competitive forces.
