= Business credit monitoring =

Business credit monitoring or company credit tracking is the monitoring of a business's credit history over time using business credit reports. They are largely used as a method to determine a company's ability to pay its debts, this type of monitoring/tracking can help credit grantors determine the creditworthiness of a business. They are typically used by a company's credit management team. The use of these reports varies and may range from protecting against suspected fraud to assessing business performance. Companies are fluid and rapidly changing; a company that may seem secure one day can become a risk overnight. While a single report is just a snapshot in time, monitoring business credit over time provides a much wider perspective on a business.

Business credit monitoring can provide instantaneous email alerts about notable or suspicious activity. In 2012, in South Carolina, businesses filing tax returns were invited to enroll in free business credit monitoring services provided by credit agencies Dun & Bradstreet and Experian. The invitation was made after state officials claimed that an international computer hacker accessed data from up to 657,000 businesses in what experts call the largest cyber-attack against a state tax agency in the nation.

The value of a business may increase when more credit becomes available to that business. Business credit reports may sometimes used by potential business partners and investors to determine how credible a company is. As a business owner, it can be useful to understand how your own business credit report will be seen and in turn how you can improve it.

In the United Kingdom, the Big Three credit agencies all offer this service as well as smaller bureaus.

== See also ==
- Accounts receivable
- Business credit reports
- Credit report
- Credit management
- Credit control
- Debt collection
