= Kenneth Lin (entrepreneur) =

American tech entrepreneur

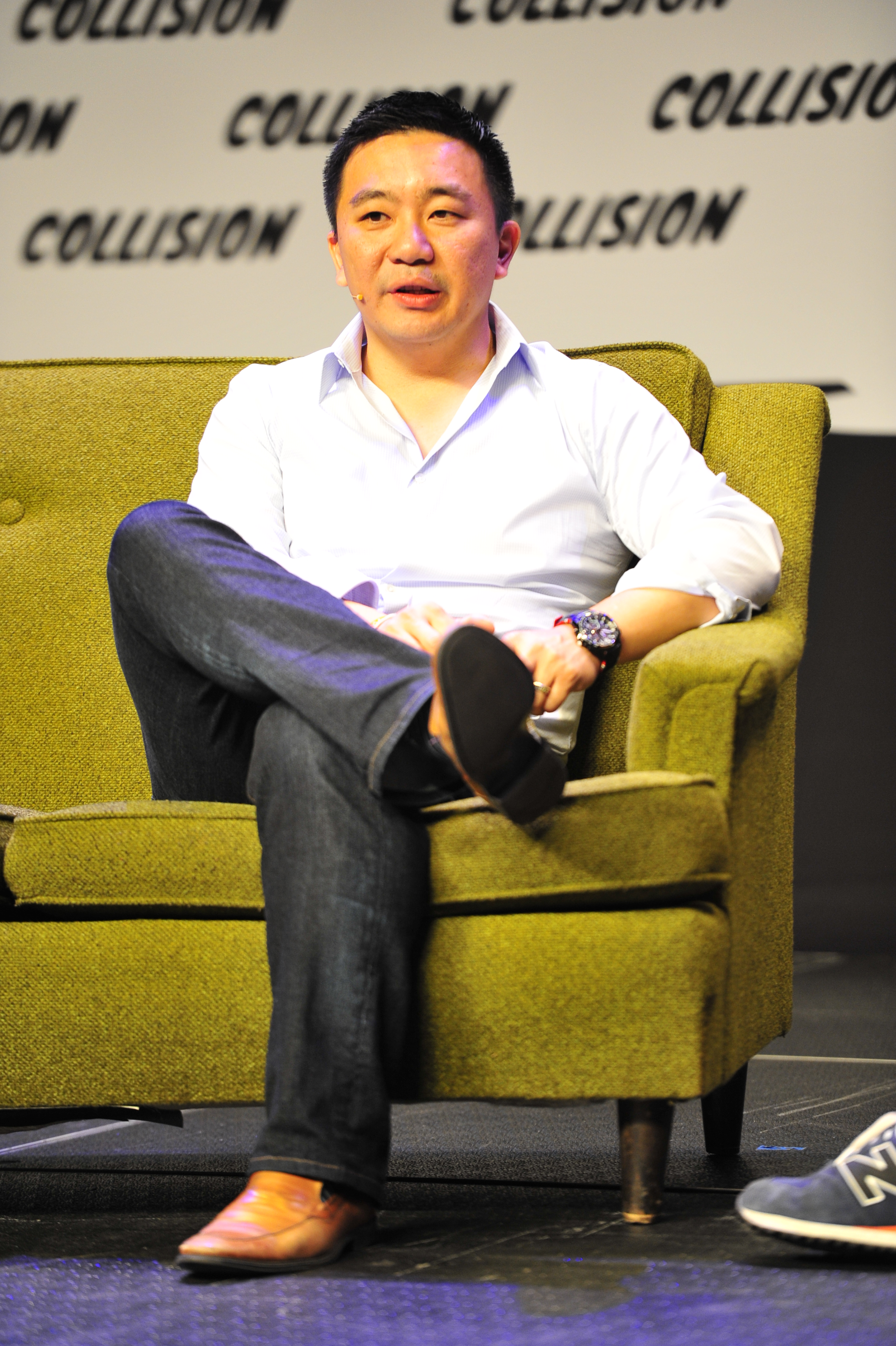
- Born: China
- Education: Boston University
- Occupation: Entrepreneur
- Known for: Credit Karma

Kenneth Lin is an American tech entrepreneur best known for founding Credit Karma, an online credit score monitoring service, in 2007. He currently serves as its CEO.

== Early life and career ==
At the age of 4, he immigrated with his parents from China to the United States. His parents worked in working-class jobs at casinos and restaurants to afford his tuition fees at Boston University. In the late 1990s, Lin began his career in the credit card industry. Prior to that, he had founded Multilytics Marketing, a data-driven marketing agency.

== Credit Karma ==
Lin has said the inspiration for Credit Karma began in 2006 when he was discouraged by the cost of obtaining his credit score and sought to create an alternative. Credit Karma was established to provide free credit scores and proved to be a hit, growing (according to the company) to over 85 million users by 2020. Lin has sought to expand the offerings of the website by including analytical tools and calculators, credit monitoring, education videos, and other tools. In an interview with the American Banker, he said the "ultimate goal" was to make the credit process more simple with the aim of being "able to make the application process two or three clicks instead of 20 or 30 minutes."

In raising venture capital funding, the company has also performed well, reaching a valuation of $3.5 billion according to Fortune magazine. Although successful in finding investors, Lin has expressed a desire to avoid quickly taking the company public. In a column penned for Fast Company he wrote about a litany of negatives associated with an IPO. His column especially focused on the downsides of "quarterly scrutiny" endured by public companies which would get in the way of the "slow and steady implementation" he wanted.

Credit Karma was acquired by Intuit for $7.1 billion in 2020.
