= Bankruptcy risk score =

A bankruptcy risk score is a number that indicates the likelihood of an individual or a commercial entity filing for bankruptcy. Although it has been used for over twenty years to assess risk in lending, few consumers know of it. It is related to the better-known credit score, but unlike credit scores, bankruptcy risk scores are not sold to consumers by any of the credit bureaus. Consequentially, individuals have little or no way of knowing what their bankruptcy risk scores are or how to improve upon them. Furthermore, since there is no standardized index of measurement, consumers often have trouble contextualizing their score on a standardized scale, instead only receiving general information from a single bureau.

This is also referred to as debt analysis which allows lenders the ability to assess a customer's risk in taking out a loan. One can improve their score by paying bills on time, keeping balances low, and having few revolving accounts.

Equifax, a US credit bureau, offers a bankruptcy risk score called the Bankruptcy Navigator Index 5.0 to its commercial clients. The BNI 5.0 BNI scores range between 1 (low) and 600 (high), providing a tiered segmentation with lower scores being a greater risk for filing for bankruptcy within the next 2 years. Most credit card issuers do not disclose the use of BNI on a letter of denial and it is difficult for consumers to know their score.

Another common bankruptcy risk score that estimates the probability a company will file for bankruptcy is the Altman Z-score. The original formula was published in 1968 by Edward I. Altman and subsequent versions of the model have been released, including the Altman Z'-score in 1983 and Altman Z''-Score in 1995.
