= Alternative data =

Non-financial data in credit files

In economic policy, alternative data refers to the inclusion of non-financial payment reporting data in credit files, such as telecom and energy utility payments.

== Types ==
Alternative data in the broadest sense refers to any non-financial information that can be used to estimate the lending risk of an individual. Information includes:

- Utility bills (such as electricity, gas, and heating oil)
- Telecommunications bills (such as landlines and mobile telephones)
- Rental payments
- Electronic payments (remittances, withdrawals, transfers, etc.)
- Social media activity
- Psychometric data
- Telco data
- Smartphone device metadata

== In North America ==
=== United States ===
In the United States, credit files include negative information, such as delinquencies as well as positive information, such as repayment of debts. Still, an estimated 35 to 54 million Americans have insufficient credit information to qualify for mainstream credit. If immigrants in the United States are included, that number exceeds 70 million. Access to credit is thus a Catch-22 for many poor Americans—one needs credit to get credit. Research suggests that the inclusion of alternative data in credit files could bring many of these individuals into the credit fold. That is, non-financial positive payment information, such as rents or utility payments, may give credit agencies enough information to rate previously unscorable individuals known as the unbanked. These newly scored individuals have risk profiles similar to those already in the mainstream credit system. Furthermore, loans become smarter. Including alternative data has little effect on the credit mainstream, those already scorable in the current system. Furthermore, this increase in data decreases the number of bad loans

Experian purchased RentBureau in June 2010, which houses rental payment histories on over 7 million US residents, this data will now be included in consumer credit reports as of January 2011. This will benefit those that overlap with the 50 million US underbanked consumers. The danger with this, is that it will provide a further variable to damage credit scores of those that do not for example manage their rental payments on time in addition to their other credit arrangements

==== Current use ====
Since the financial crisis of late 2008, many Americans have struggled with the negative change to their credit score. Reduced credit lines resulting in a new group of consumers in need of liquidity forced this growing consumer segment to seek alternative financial services providers. Businesses relying on traditional credit reports to make credit decisions have had limited to no visibility on the new credit usage behaviors of this growing portion because alternative data is not information that the traditional bureaus capture or tend to report.

Utilities and telecoms firms in several states have started reporting their data to CRAs. PRBC, a consumer credit reporting agency based in Kennesaw, Georgia, allows consumers to self-enroll and build a positive credit file based on their timely payments for bills such as rent, utilities, cable, telephone, and insurance that are not automatically reported to the other bureaus. TransUnion, First American CredCo, and LexisNexis have all recently released products involving alternative data.

==== Concerns ====
Some concerns about the use of alternative data have been raised over the long-term consequences of fully reporting utility and telecom payments to credit rating agencies. There are concerns that state and local incentives to not pay bills on time (for example, some states provide heating oil subsidies if payments are missed) may cause deterioration in credit scores over time. There is also concern that people who open accounts with only alternative data will become over-extended. Recent research shows, however, that the inclusion of alternative data does not degrade credit scores over a one-year period.

== Worldwide ==
Fully reported non-financial payment data has been included in consumer credit reports in many countries around the world including the United Kingdom, Germany, Italy, Australia, China, Mexico, and Colombia to name a few. Indeed, Colombia has used this data successfully for more than 40 years.

Recently, the World Bank issued a global credit information sharing standard that included a section on alternative data. The World Bank steadfastly endorses the use of fully reported non-financial payment data in credit origination processes and considers it a powerful tool for driving financial inclusion in emerging markets. More recently, in the Financial Inclusion 2020 Roadmap, Accion highlighted the great value of alternative data as an instrument to increase financial inclusion and help achieve their FI2020 objectives.

In low-income nations, alternative data is often the only type of data available for credit scoring. The population is often not formally employed, lacks a credit history, cannot fulfill loan application requirements, and has insufficient capital. Even when these requirements are fulfilled, lending institutions often have very little experience with clients' economic activity leading to untailored loan products.

Electronically-available alternative data, such as social media activity, bill payments, mobile telephone bills and metadata, rental payments, and electronic transaction data, could be used to score these individuals and enter millions in low-income countries into a more modern credit ratings system.

An especially promising option is the full reporting of trade credit data, such as records from cash and carry warehouses.

== See also ==
- Alternative data (finance)
- PRBC (company)
