= Credit history =

Record of a borrower's responsible repayment of debts

A credit history is a record of a borrower's responsible repayment of debts. A credit report is a record of the borrower's credit history from a number of sources, including banks, credit card companies, collection agencies, and governments. A borrower's credit score is the result of a mathematical algorithm applied to a credit report and other sources of information to predict future delinquency.

In many countries, when a customer submits an application for credit from a bank, credit card company, or a store, their information is forwarded to a credit bureau. The credit bureau matches the name, address and other identifying information on the credit applicant with information retained by the bureau in its files. The gathered records are then used by lenders to determine an individual's credit worthiness; that is, determining an individual's ability and track record of repaying a debt. The willingness to repay a debt is indicated by how timely past payments have been made to other lenders. Lenders like to see consumer debt obligations paid regularly and on time, and therefore focus particularly on missed payments and may not, for example, consider an overpayment as an offset for a missed payment.

== Credit history usage ==
There has been much discussion over the accuracy of the data in consumer reports. In general, industry participants maintain that the data in credit reports is very accurate. The credit bureaus point to their own study of 52 million credit reports to highlight that the data in reports is very accurate. The Consumer Data Industry Association testified before the United States Congress that less than two percent of those reports that resulted in a consumer dispute had data deleted because it was in error. Nonetheless, there is widespread concern that information in credit reports is prone to error. Thus Congress has enacted a series of laws aimed to resolve both the errors and the perception of errors.

If a US consumer disputes some information in a credit report, the credit bureau has 30 days to verify the data. Over 70 percent of these consumer disputes are resolved within 14 days and then the consumer is notified of the resolution. The Federal Trade Commission states that one large credit bureau notes 95 percent of those who dispute an item seem satisfied with the outcome.

The other factor in determining whether a lender will provide a consumer credit or a loan is dependent on income. The higher the income, all other things being equal, the more credit the consumer can access. However, lenders make credit granting decisions based on both ability to repay a debt (income) and willingness (the credit report) as indicated by a history of regular, unmissed payments.

These factors help lenders determine whether to extend credit, and on what terms. With the adoption of risk-based pricing on almost all lending in the financial services industry, this report has become even more important since it is usually the sole element used to choose the annual percentage rate (APR), grace period and other contractual obligations of the credit card or loan.

== Calculating a credit score ==
Credit scores vary from one scoring model to another, but in general the FICO scoring system is the standard in U.S., Canada and other global areas. The factors are similar and may include:

- Payment history (35% contribution on the FICO scale): A record of negative information can lower a consumer's credit rating or score. In general, risk scoring systems look for any of the following: bankruptcies, collections, charge offs, late/missed payments, repossessions, foreclosures, settlements, liens, and judgements. Within this category, FICO considers the severity of the negative item, the age of the negative items and the prevalence of negative items. More recent unpaid or delinquent debt is considered worse than older unpaid or delinquent debts.
- Debt (30% contribution on the FICO score): This category considers the amount and type of debt carried by a consumer as reflected on their credit reports. The amount of debt you have divided by your total credit limit is called the credit utilization ratio. There are three types of debt considered in this calculation.
  - Revolving debt: This is credit card debt, retail card debt and some petroleum cards. And while home equity lines of credit have revolving terms the bulk of debt considered is true unsecured revolving debt incurred on plastic. The most important measurement from this category is called "Revolving Utilization", which is the relationship between the consumer's aggregate credit card balances and the available credit card limits, also called "open to buy". This is expressed as a percentage and is calculated by dividing the aggregate credit card balances by the aggregate credit limits and multiplying the result by 100, thus yielding the utilization percentage. The higher that percentage, the lower the cardholder's score will likely be. This is why closing credit cards is generally not a good idea for someone trying to improve their credit scores. Closing one or more credit card accounts will reduce their total available credit limits and likely increase the utilization percentage unless the cardholder reduces their balances at the same pace.
  - Installment debt: This is debt where there is a fixed payment for a fixed period of time. An auto loan is a good example as the cardholder is generally making the same payment for 36, 48, or 60 months. While installment debt is considered in risk scoring systems, it is a distant second in its importance behind the revolving credit card debt. Installment debt is generally secured by an asset like a car, home, or boat. As such, consumers will use extraordinary efforts to make their payments so their asset is not repossessed by the lender for non-payment.
  - Open debt: This is the least common type of debt. This is debt that must be paid in full each month. An example is any one of the variety of charge cards that are "pay in full" products. The American Express Green card is a common example. Open debt is treated like revolving credit card debt in older versions of the FICO scoring system but is excluded from the revolving utilization calculation in newer versions.
- Time in file (Credit File Age) (15% contribution on the FICO scale): The older the cardholder's credit report, the more stable it is, in general. As such, their score should benefit from an old credit report. This "age" is determined two ways; the age of the cardholder's credit file and the average age of the accounts on their credit file. The age of their credit file is determined by the oldest account's "date opened", which sets the age of the credit file. The average age is set by averaging the age of every account on the credit report, whether open or closed.
- Account Diversity (10% contribution on the FICO scale): A cardholder's credit score will benefit by having a diverse set of account types on their credit file. Having experience across multiple account types (installment, revolving, auto, mortgage, cards, etc.) is generally a good thing for their scores because they are proving the ability to manage different account types.
- The Search for a New Credit (Credit inquiries) (10% contribution on the FICO scale): An inquiry is noted every time a company requests some information from a consumer's credit file. There are several kinds of inquiries that may or may not affect one's credit score. Inquiries that have no effect on the creditworthiness of a consumer (also known as "soft inquiries"), which remain on a consumer's credit reports for 6 months and are never visible to lenders or credit scoring models, are:
  - Prescreening inquiries where a credit bureau may sell a person's contact information to an institution that issues credit cards, loans and insurance based on certain criteria that the lender has established.
  - A creditor also checks its customers' credit files periodically. This is referred to as Account Management, Account Maintenance or Account Review.
  - A credit counseling agency, with the client's permission, can obtain a client's credit report with no adverse action.
  - A consumer can check his or her own credit report without impacting creditworthiness. This is referred to as a "consumer disclosure" inquiry.
  - Employment screening inquiries
  - Insurance related inquiries
  - Utility related inquiries
- Inquiries that can have an effect on the creditworthiness of a consumer, and are visible to lenders and credit scoring models, (also known as "hard inquiries") are made by lenders when consumers are seeking credit or a loan, in connection with permissible purpose. Lenders, when granted a permissible purpose, as defined by the Fair Credit Reporting Act, can "pull" a consumer file for the purposes of extending credit to a consumer. Hard inquiries can, but do not always, affect the borrower's credit score. Keeping credit inquiries to a minimum can help a person's credit rating. A lender may perceive many inquiries over a short period of time on a person's report as a signal that the person is in financial difficulty, and may consider that person a poor credit risk.

== Acquiring and understanding credit reports and scores ==
Consumers can typically check their credit history by requesting credit reports from credit agencies and demanding correction of information if necessary.

In the United States, the Fair Credit Reporting Act governs businesses that compile credit reports. These businesses range from the big three credit reporting agencies, Experian, Equifax, TransUnion, to specialty credit reporting agencies that cater to specific clients including payday lenders, utility companies, casinos, landlords, medical service providers, and employers. One Fair Credit Reporting Act requirement is that the consumer credit reporting agencies it governs provide a free copy of the credit reports for any consumer who requests it, once per year.

The government of Canada offers a free publication called Understanding Your Credit Report and Credit Score. This publication provides sample credit report and credit score documents with explanations of the notations and codes that are used. It also contains general information on how to build or improve credit history, and how to check for signs that identity theft has occurred. The publication is available online through http://www.fcac.gc.ca, the site of the Financial Consumer Agency of Canada. Paper copies can also be ordered at no charge for residents of Canada.

In some countries, in addition to privately owned credit bureaus, credit records are also maintained by the central bank. Particularly, in Spain, the Central Credit Register is kept by the Bank of Spain. In this country, individuals can obtain their credit reports free of charge by requesting them online or by mail.

== Credit history of immigrants ==
Credit history usually stays within one country. Even within the same credit card network or within the same multinational credit bureau, information is not shared between different countries. For example, Equifax Canada does not share credit information with Equifax in the United States. If a person has been living in Canada for many years and then moves to USA, when they apply for credit in the U.S., they may not be approved because of a lack of U.S. credit history, even if they had an excellent credit rating in their home country.

An immigrant may end up establishing a credit history from scratch in the new country. Therefore, it is usually difficult for immigrants to obtain credit cards and mortgages until after they have worked in the new country with a stable income for several years.

Some lenders do take into account credit history from other countries, but this practice is not common. Among credit card companies, American Express can transfer credit cards from one country to another and in this way help start a credit history.

== Adverse credit ==
Adverse credit history, also called sub-prime credit history, non-status credit history, impaired credit history, poor credit history, and bad credit history, is a negative credit rating.

A negative credit rating is often considered undesirable to lenders and other extenders of credit for the purposes of loaning money or capital.

In the U.S., a consumer's credit history is compiled into a credit report by credit bureaus or consumer reporting agencies. The data reported to these agencies are primarily provided to them by creditors and includes detailed records of the relationship a person has with the creditor. Detailed account information, including payment history, credit limits, high and low balances, and any aggressive actions taken to recover overdue debts, are all reported regularly (usually monthly). This information is reviewed by a lender to determine whether to approve a loan and on what terms.

As credit became more popular, it became more difficult for lenders to evaluate and approve credit card and loan applications in a timely and efficient manner. To address this issue, credit scoring was adopted. A benefit of scoring was that it made credit available to more consumers and at less cost.

Credit scoring is the process of using a proprietary mathematical algorithm to create a numerical value that describes an applicant's overall creditworthiness. Scores, frequently based on numbers (ranging from 300–850 for consumers in the United States), statistically analyze a credit history, in comparison to other debtors, and gauge the magnitude of financial risk. Since lending money to a person or company is a risk, credit scoring offers a standardized way for lenders to assess that risk rapidly and "without prejudice". All credit bureaus also offer credit scoring as a supplemental service.

Credit scores assess the likelihood that a borrower will repay a loan or other credit obligation based on factors like their borrowing and repayment history, the types of credit they have taken out and the overall length of their credit history. The higher the score, the better the credit history and the higher the probability that the loan will be repaid on time. When creditors report an excessive number of late payments, or trouble with collecting payments, the score suffers. Similarly, when adverse judgments and collection agency activity are reported, the score decreases even more. Repeated delinquencies or public record entries can lower the score and trigger what is called a negative credit rating or adverse credit history.

A consumer's credit score is a number calculated from factors such as the amount of credit outstanding versus how much they owe, their past ability to pay all their bills on time, how long they have had credit, types of credit used and number of inquiries. The three major consumer reporting agencies, Equifax, Experian and TransUnion all sell credit scores to lenders. Fair Isaac is one of the major developers of credit scores used by these consumer reporting agencies. The complete way in which a consumer's FICO score is calculated is complex. One of the factors in a consumer's FICO score is credit checks on their credit history. When a lender requests a credit score, it can cause a small drop in the credit score. That is because, as stated above, a number of inquiries over a relatively short period of time can indicate the consumer is in a financially difficult situation.

== Consequences ==
The information in a credit report is sold by credit agencies to organizations that are considering whether to offer credit to individuals or companies. It is also available to other entities with a "permissible purpose", as defined by the Fair Credit Reporting Act. The consequence of a negative credit rating is typically a reduction in the likelihood that a lender will approve an application for credit under favorable terms, if at all. Interest rates on loans are significantly affected by credit history; the higher the credit rating, the lower the interest, while the lower the credit rating, the higher the interest. The increased interest is used to offset the higher rate of default within the low credit rating group of individuals.

In the United States, insurance, housing, and employment can be denied based on a negative credit rating. A 2013 survey showed that employer credit checks on job seekers were preventing them from entering the workforce. Results indicated at the time that one in four unemployed Americans have been required to go through a credit check when applying for a job. Federal regulations require employers to receive permission from job candidates before running credit checks, but it could be difficult to enforce employer disclosure as to the reason for job denial.

Note that it is not the credit reporting agencies that decide whether a credit history is "adverse". It is the individual lender or creditor which makes that decision; each lender has its own policy on what scores fall within their guidelines. The specific scores that fall within a lender's guidelines are most often not disclosed to the applicant due to competitive reasons. In the United States, a creditor is required to give the reasons for denying credit to an applicant immediately and must also provide the name and address of the credit reporting agency who provided data that was used to make the decision.

== Abuse ==
Astute consumers and criminal minded people have been able to identify and exploit vulnerabilities in the credit scoring systems to obtain credit. For example, previous ownership of a credit card may significantly increase an individual's ability to obtain further credit, while privacy issues may prevent a fraud from being exposed. Certain telecommunication companies and their relationship with credit reporting bureaus have enabled fabricated credit files to be created by the exploit of privacy blocks, which deny any third party entity to actual information held by the government. While the credit reporting system is designed to protect both lenders and borrowers, there are loopholes which can allow opportunistic individuals to abuse the system. A few of the motivations and techniques for credit abuse include churning, rapidfire credit applications, repetitive credit checks, selective credit freezes, applications for small business rather than personal credit, piggybacking and hacking, as it happened with Equifax in April and September 2017.

Additionally, fraud can be committed on consumers by credit reporting agencies themselves. In 2013, Equifax and TransUnion were fined $23.3 million by the Consumer Financial Protection Bureau (U.S.) for deceiving customers about the cost of their services. Services advertised as $1 were actually billed at $200 per year.

== See also ==
- Alternative data
- Business credit monitoring
- Comparison of free credit monitoring services
- Credit bureau
- Credit card
- Credit score in the United States
- Credit zombie
- Criticism of credit scoring systems in the United States
- Identity theft
- Fair Credit Reporting Act
- Fair and Accurate Credit Transactions Act
- Fair Debt Collection Practices Act
- Office of Fair Trading
- Seasoned tradeline
