= Demotech =

American insurance rating service

Demotech, Inc.
- Type: Corporation
- Industry: Financial services
- Founded: 1985
- Founder: Joseph L. Petrelli; Sharon Romano Petrelli
- Headquarters: Dublin, Ohio, U.S.
- Area served: United States
- Key people: Joseph L. Petrelli (President & CEO); Sharon Romano Petrelli (CFO)
- Products: Demotech Difference (magazine)
- Services: Rating agency, insurance information publications
- Number of employees: 18 (2025)
- Website: www.demotech.com

Demotech, Inc., is an American insurance rating agency headquartered in Dublin, Ohio, that focuses on independent, regional, and specialty companies in the property and casualty insurance (P&C) industry. It is independent from the companies that it rates.

== Description ==
An insurance rating agency issues financial-strength ratings measuring a company's ability to immediately pay insurance claims presented. On the other hand, a credit rating agency issues financial-strength ratings measuring a company's ability to pay back debt by making timely principal and interest payments and the likelihood of default.

Traditional credit rating companies such as AM Best, Moody's Investors Service, Standard and Poor's, and Fitch Ratings do rate insurance providers, but typically only large national companies. Demotech was founded in 1985 to provide financial analysis of, and actuarial services for, niche markets ignored by the Big Three credit rating agencies. The principals were Joseph and Sharon Romano Petrelli.

The U.S. Securities and Exchange Commission provides a list of nationally recognized statistical rating organizations on its website. As of August 2022, Demotech was one of ten organizations on that list.

== Ratings ==
Demotech developed a rating system for independent, specialty, and regional insurance carriers. It gathers and analyzes annual and quarterly statutory financial statements, statements of actuarial opinion, actuarial opinion summaries, reinsurance information, audit reports, and discussions with management. It then performs "an analysis of a series of quantitative ratios and certain qualitative considerations."

Demotech uses the registered term "Financial Stability Rating" (FSR) to judge an insurer's ability to perform in the general economy and the "underwriting cycle that exists in the insurance industry."

Furthermore, a December 2023 study by researchers at Harvard, Columbia, and the Federal Reserve found that Demotech's examinations were not as thorough as other insurance rating agencies. According to an analysis by The Wall Street Journal, insurers rated by Demotech were 30 times more likely to become insolvent than insurers rated by Demotech's rivals.

The company has eight levels of stability. The first five predict the percentage of insurers that will have a surplus 18 months after their ratings no matter "the severity of a general economic downturn or deterioration in the insurance cycle."

Rating	Percent	Description
A″	100%	(A Double Prime), Unsurpassed
A′	99%	(A Prime), Unsurpassed
A	97%	Exceptional
S	95%	Substantial
M	90%	Moderate
L	--	Licensed by state regulatory authorities. Evaluation of their financials precludes assignment at an FSR.
NR	--	Not Rated do not currently have an FSR.
N/A	--	Ineligible for an FSR because complete financial data was not available.

Their FSRs were approved by Fannie Mae in 1989, Freddie Mac in 1990, and HUD in 1993. Following Hurricane Andrew in 1992, more than 20 insurance companies could not cover their losses and were taken over by the state of Florida. In 1996, the Florida Office of Insurance Regulation requested that Demotech rate new Property & Casualty Insurance companies doing business in Florida. Because newly capitalized insurers do not have the financial records typically utilized, a new process was developed using business plans; pro forma financial statements; administrative agreements; marketing and sales materials; job descriptions of key personnel; investment policy statement; claims department procedures and practices; initial rate, rule, and form filings; biographies of critical employees, service providers and principals; reinsurance data; Catastrophe modeling reports; and Underwriting guidelines and application. As of 2014, the company was reviewing/rating companies that write about 60% of those policies in Florida and were reviewing/rating over 400 insurance carriers nationwide.

Demotech issues financial stability ratings for 50 Florida-based insurers. On March 23, 2022, the top five executives from Demotech sent a letter to Florida Governor Ron DeSantis plus the Senator and House leadership entreating them to pass reforms before the start of Atlantic hurricane season on June 1. Failure to do so would cause Demotech to downgrade the financial stability ratings for "a number" of Florida insurers. The letter stated: "The conditions of the property insurance marketplace in Florida are unsustainable, and without the necessary corrective action, many Florida insurers will struggle to maintain adequate surplus, efficient capital sources will avoid the market, private reinsurance costs will become prohibitively expensive, and consumers will ultimately bear the cost."

As of 2025, Demotech rated 98 percent of the insurers that it had assessed as grade A or higher. An analysis by The Wall Street Journal found that Demotech had not removed a grade A rating from any insurer until less than a year before its insolvency. Of the 15 property and casualty insurers in Florida and Louisiana that became insolvent between 2021 and 2023, 14 had been rated A by Demotech within a year of their insolvency.

== Comparisons ==
In 2011, the Florida State University College of Business, Risk Management and Insurance compared Demotech FSRs with insurer ratings issued by AM Best plus the Big Three (credit rating agencies). Their independent study reviewed thousands of insurer ratings issued over nine years. The resulting paper was "A Comprehensive Examination of Insurer Financial Strength Ratings," and its executive summary contained the following conclusions:

- ratings comparisons between Demotech and others show "relative consistency"
- Demotech serves a unique group of insurers
- there is general consistency in the firms that each agency would categorize as financially secure
- the comparability between Demotech and others has "important public policy implications for insurers, regulators and consumers"
- Demotech provides an important service within the ratings community and plays a very important role in the insurance market.

In 2023, researchers from Columbia Business School, Harvard Business School, and the Federal Reserve Board examined the quality of Florida property insurers rated by Demotech versus traditional rating agencies, and found:

- "Demotech[-rated] insurers are of significantly lower quality than traditional insurers across most observable measures of financial and operational risks."
- "Demotech ratings are almost uniformly high and sufficient to meet the GSE (Note: Government-Sponsored Enterprise, e.g. Fannie Mae or Freddie Mac) threshold. This is despite the fact that traditional insurers are higher quality on average."
- "[A] vast majority of Demotech insurers would not meet GSE eligibility under AM Best's methodology."
