= Bond credit rating =

Creditworthiness of corporate or government bonds

In investment, the bond credit rating represents the creditworthiness of corporate or government bonds. The ratings are published by credit rating agencies and used by investment professionals to assess the likelihood the debt will be repaid.

== Credit rating agencies ==
Credit rating is a highly concentrated industry with the "Big Three" credit rating agencies – Fitch Ratings, Moody's and Standard & Poor's (S&P) – controlling approximately 95% of the ratings business.

Credit rating agencies registered as such with the SEC are "nationally recognized statistical rating organizations". The following firms are currently registered as NRSROs: A.M. Best Company, Inc.; DBRS Ltd.; Egan-Jones Rating Company; Fitch, Inc.; HR Ratings; Japan Credit Rating Agency; Kroll Bond Rating Agency; Moody's Investors Service, Inc.; Rating and Investment Information, Inc.; Morningstar Credit Ratings, LLC; and Standard & Poor's Ratings Services.

Under the Credit Rating Agency Reform Act, an NRSRO may be registered with respect to up to five classes of credit ratings: (1) financial institutions, brokers, or dealers; (2) insurance companies; (3) corporate issuers; (4) issuers of asset-backed securities; and (5) issuers of government securities, municipal securities, or securities issued by a foreign government.

In Asia, the regulated and recognized credit rating agencies in the domestic markets are – in China: China Chengxin International (CCXI), China Lianhe Credit Rating (Lianhe Ratings), CSCI Pengyuan, New Century Zixin Assessment Investment Service; in Japan: Rating and Investment Information (R&I); in India: ICRA (ICRA), Credit Analysis and Research (CARE) and CRISIL.

== Credit rating codes and classes ==
The credit rating is a financial indicator to potential investors of debt securities such as bonds. These are assigned by credit rating agencies such as Moody's, Standard & Poor's, and Fitch, which publish code designations (such as AAA, B, CC) to express their assessment of the risk quality of a bond. Moody's assigns bond credit ratings of Aaa, Aa, A, Baa, Ba, B, Caa, Ca, C, as well as WR and NR for 'withdrawn' and 'not rated' respectively. Standard & Poor's and Fitch assign bond credit ratings of AAA, AA, A, BBB, BB, B, CCC, CC, C, D. Currently there are only two companies in the United States with an AAA credit rating: Microsoft and Johnson & Johnson. These individual codes are grouped into broader classes described as "investment grade" or not, or in numbered tiers from high to low.

In addition to the rating codes, agencies typically supplement the current assessment with indications of the chances for future upgrades or downgrades over the medium term. For example, Moody's designates an Outlook for a given rating as Positive (POS, likely to upgrade), Negative (NEG, likely to downgrade), Stable (STA, likely to remain unchanged), or Developing (DEV, contingent on some future event).

Moody's		S&P		Fitch		Equivalent to SVO Designations	Rating description	
Long-term	Short-term	Long-term	Short-term	Long-term	Short-term	NAIC	Rating description	
Aaa	P-1	AAA	A-1+	AAA	F1+	1	Prime	Investment-grade
Aa1	P-1	AA+	A-1+	AA+	F1+	1	High grade	Investment-grade
Aa2	P-1	AA	A-1+	AA	F1+	1	High grade	Investment-grade
Aa3	P-1	AA−	A-1+	AA−	F1+	1	High grade	Investment-grade
A1	P-1	A+	A-1	A+	F1	1	Upper medium grade	Investment-grade
A2	P-1	A	A-1	A	F1	1	Upper medium grade	Investment-grade
A3	P-2	A−	A-2	A−	F2	1	Upper medium grade	Investment-grade
Baa1	P-2	BBB+	A-2	BBB+	F2	2	Lower medium grade	Investment-grade
Baa2	P-3	BBB	A-3	BBB	F3	2	Lower medium grade	Investment-grade
Baa3	P-3	BBB−	A-3	BBB−	F3	2	Lower medium grade	Investment-grade
Ba1	Not prime	BB+	B	BB+	B	3	Non-investment grade speculative	Non-investment grade AKA high-yield bonds AKA junk bonds
Ba2	Not prime	BB	B	BB	B	3	Non-investment grade speculative	Non-investment grade AKA high-yield bonds AKA junk bonds
Ba3	Not prime	BB−	B	BB−	B	3	Non-investment grade speculative	Non-investment grade AKA high-yield bonds AKA junk bonds
B1	Not prime	B+	B	B+	B	4	Highly speculative	Non-investment grade AKA high-yield bonds AKA junk bonds
B2	Not prime	B	B	B	B	4	Highly speculative	Non-investment grade AKA high-yield bonds AKA junk bonds
B3	Not prime	B−	B	B−	B	4	Highly speculative	Non-investment grade AKA high-yield bonds AKA junk bonds
Caa1	Not prime	CCC+	C	CCC	C	5	Substantial risks	Non-investment grade AKA high-yield bonds AKA junk bonds
Caa2	Not prime	CCC	C	CCC	C	5	Extremely speculative	Non-investment grade AKA high-yield bonds AKA junk bonds
Caa3	Not prime	CCC−	C	CCC	C	5	Default imminent with little prospect for recovery	Non-investment grade AKA high-yield bonds AKA junk bonds
Ca	Not prime	CC	C	CCC	C	6	Default imminent with little prospect for recovery	Non-investment grade AKA high-yield bonds AKA junk bonds
Ca	Not prime	C	C	CCC	C	6	Default imminent with little prospect for recovery	Non-investment grade AKA high-yield bonds AKA junk bonds
C	Not prime	D	/	DDD	/	6	In default	Non-investment grade AKA high-yield bonds AKA junk bonds
/	Not prime	D	/	DD	/	6	In default	Non-investment grade AKA high-yield bonds AKA junk bonds
/	Not prime	D	/	D	/	6	In default	Non-investment grade AKA high-yield bonds AKA junk bonds

=== Rating tier definitions ===
Moody's	S&P	Fitch	Creditworthiness
Aaa1	AAA+	AAA+	An obligor has extremely strong capacity to meet its financial commitments.
Aaa2	AAA	AAA	An obligor has extremely strong capacity to meet its financial commitments.
Aaa3	AAA−	AAA−	An obligor has extremely strong capacity to meet its financial commitments.
Aa1	AA+	AA+	An obligor has very strong capacity to meet its financial commitments. It differs from the highest-rated obligors only to a small degree.
Aa2	AA	AA	An obligor has very strong capacity to meet its financial commitments. It differs from the highest-rated obligors only to a small degree.
Aa3	AA−	AA−	An obligor has very strong capacity to meet its financial commitments. It differs from the highest-rated obligors only to a small degree.
A1	A+	A+	An obligor has strong capacity to meet its financial commitments but is somewhat more susceptible to the adverse effects of changes in circumstances and economic conditions than obligors in higher-rated categories.
A2	A	A	An obligor has strong capacity to meet its financial commitments but is somewhat more susceptible to the adverse effects of changes in circumstances and economic conditions than obligors in higher-rated categories.
A3	A−	A−	An obligor has strong capacity to meet its financial commitments but is somewhat more susceptible to the adverse effects of changes in circumstances and economic conditions than obligors in higher-rated categories.
Baa1	BBB+	BBB+	An obligor has adequate capacity to meet its financial commitments. However, adverse economic conditions or changing circumstances are more likely to lead to a weakened capacity of the obligor to meet its financial commitments.
Baa2	BBB	BBB	An obligor has adequate capacity to meet its financial commitments. However, adverse economic conditions or changing circumstances are more likely to lead to a weakened capacity of the obligor to meet its financial commitments.
Baa3	BBB−	BBB−	An obligor has adequate capacity to meet its financial commitments. However, adverse economic conditions or changing circumstances are more likely to lead to a weakened capacity of the obligor to meet its financial commitments.
Ba1	BB+	BB+	An obligor is less vulnerable in the near term than other lower-rated obligors. However, it faces major ongoing uncertainties and exposure to adverse business, financial, or economic conditions which could lead to the obligor's inadequate capacity to meet its financial commitments.
Ba2	BB	BB	An obligor is less vulnerable in the near term than other lower-rated obligors. However, it faces major ongoing uncertainties and exposure to adverse business, financial, or economic conditions which could lead to the obligor's inadequate capacity to meet its financial commitments.
Ba3	BB−	BB−	An obligor is less vulnerable in the near term than other lower-rated obligors. However, it faces major ongoing uncertainties and exposure to adverse business, financial, or economic conditions which could lead to the obligor's inadequate capacity to meet its financial commitments.
B1	B+	B+	An obligor is more vulnerable than the obligors rated 'BB', but the obligor currently has the capacity to meet its financial commitments. Adverse business, financial, or economic conditions will likely impair the obligor's capacity or willingness to meet its financial commitments.
B2	B	B	An obligor is more vulnerable than the obligors rated 'BB', but the obligor currently has the capacity to meet its financial commitments. Adverse business, financial, or economic conditions will likely impair the obligor's capacity or willingness to meet its financial commitments.
B3	B−	B−	An obligor is more vulnerable than the obligors rated 'BB', but the obligor currently has the capacity to meet its financial commitments. Adverse business, financial, or economic conditions will likely impair the obligor's capacity or willingness to meet its financial commitments.
Caa1	CCC+	CCC+	An obligor is currently vulnerable, and is dependent upon favourable business, financial, and economic conditions to meet its financial commitments.
Caa2	CCC	CCC	An obligor is currently vulnerable, and is dependent upon favourable business, financial, and economic conditions to meet its financial commitments.
Caa3	CCC−	CCC−	An obligor is currently vulnerable, and is dependent upon favourable business, financial, and economic conditions to meet its financial commitments.
Ca1	CC+	CC+	An obligor is currently highly vulnerable.
Ca2	CC	CC	An obligor is currently highly vulnerable.
Ca3	CC−	CC−	An obligor is currently highly vulnerable.
	C+	C+	The obligor is currently highly vulnerable to nonpayment. May be used where a bankruptcy petition has been filed.
	C	C	The obligor is currently highly vulnerable to nonpayment. May be used where a bankruptcy petition has been filed.
	C−	C−	The obligor is currently highly vulnerable to nonpayment. May be used where a bankruptcy petition has been filed.
C	D	D	An obligor has failed to pay one or more of its financial obligations (rated or unrated) when it became due.
Other annotations
e, p	pr	Expected	Preliminary ratings may be assigned to obligations pending receipt of final documentation and legal opinions. The final rating may differ from the preliminary rating.
WR		WD	Rating withdrawn for reasons including: debt maturity, calls, puts, conversions, etc., or business reasons (e.g. change in the size of a debt issue), or the issuer defaults.
Unsolicited	Unsolicited		This rating was initiated by the ratings agency and not requested by the issuer.
	SD	RD	This rating is assigned when the agency believes that the obligor has selectively defaulted on a specific issue or class of obligations but it will continue to meet its payment obligations on other issues or classes of obligations in a timely manner.
NR	NR	NR	No rating has been requested, or there is insufficient information on which to base a rating.

=== Investment grade ===
A bond is considered investment grade or IG if its credit rating is BBB− or higher by Fitch Ratings or S&P, or Baa3 or higher by Moody's, the so-called "Big Three" credit rating agencies. Generally they are bonds that are judged by the rating agency as likely enough to meet payment obligations that banks are allowed to invest in them.

Ratings play a critical role in determining how much companies and other entities that issue debt, including sovereign governments, have to pay to access credit markets, i.e., the amount of interest they pay on their issued debt. The threshold between investment-grade and speculative-grade ratings has important market implications for issuers' borrowing costs.

Bonds that are not rated as investment-grade bonds are known as high-yield bonds or more derisively as junk bonds.

The risks associated with investment-grade bonds (or investment-grade corporate debt) are considered significantly higher than those associated with first-class government bonds. The difference between rates for first-class government bonds and investment-grade bonds is called investment-grade spread. The range of this spread is an indicator of the market's belief in the stability of the economy. The higher these investment-grade spreads (or risk premiums) are, the weaker the economy is considered.

== Criticism ==
Until the early 1970s, bond credit ratings agencies were paid for their work by investors who wanted impartial information on the creditworthiness of securities issuers and their particular offerings. Starting in the early 1970s, the "Big Three" ratings agencies (S&P, Moody's, and Fitch) began to receive payment for their work by the securities issuers for whom they issue those ratings, which has led to charges that these ratings agencies can no longer always be impartial when issuing ratings for those securities issuers. Securities issuers have been accused of "shopping" for the best ratings from these three ratings agencies, in order to attract investors, until at least one of the agencies delivers favorable ratings. This arrangement has been cited as one of the primary causes of the subprime mortgage crisis (which began in 2007); some securities, particularly mortgage-backed securities (MBSs) and collateralized debt obligations (CDOs), were rated highly by the credit ratings agencies and thus heavily invested in by many organizations and individuals, but were then rapidly and vastly devalued due to defaults, and fear of defaults, on some of the individual components of those securities, such as home loans and credit card accounts. Other countries are beginning to mull the creation of domestic credit ratings agencies to challenge the dominance of the "Big Three", for example in Russia, where the ACRA was founded in 2016.

== Municipal bonds ==
Municipal bonds are instruments issued by local, state, or federal governments in the United States. Until April–May 2010, Moody's and Fitch were rating municipal bonds on the separate naming/classification system which mirrored the tiers for corporate bonds. S&P abolished its dual rating system in 2000.

== Default rates ==
The historical default rate for municipal bonds is lower than that of corporate bonds. A potential misuse of historic default statistics "is to assume that historical average default rates represent the 'probability of default' of debt in a particular rating category. However, [...] default rates can vary significantly from one year to the next and the observed rate for any given year can vary significantly from the average."

Standard & Poor's one-year global corporate default rates by refined rating category, 1981–2008
Year	AAA	AA+	AA	AA−	A+	A	A−	BBB+	BBB	BBB−	BB+	BB	BB−	B+	B	B−	CCC to C
1981	0	0	0	0	0	0	0	0	0	0	0	0	0	0	3.28	0	0
1982	0	0	0	0	0	0.33	0	0	0.68	0	0	2.86	7.04	2.22	2.33	7.41	21.43
1983	0	0	0	0	0	0	0	0	0	1.33	2.17	0	1.59	1.22	9.80	4.76	6.67
1984	0	0	0	0	0	0	0	0	1.40	0	0	1.64	1.49	2.13	3.51	7.69	25.00
1985	0	0	0	0	0	0	0	0	0	0	1.64	1.49	1.33	2.59	13.11	8.00	15.38
1986	0	0	0	0	0	0	0.78	0	0.78	0	1.82	1.18	1.12	4.65	12.16	16.67	23.08
1987	0	0	0	0	0	0	0	0	0	0	0	0	0.83	1.31	5.95	6.82	12.28
1988	0	0	0	0	0	0	0	0	0	0	0	0	2.33	1.98	4.50	9.80	20.37
1989	0	0	0	0	0	0	0	0.90	0.78	0	0	0	1.98	0.43	7.80	4.88	31.58
1990	0	0	0	0	0	0	0	0.76	0	1.10	2.78	3.06	4.46	4.87	12.26	22.58	31.25
1991	0	0	0	0	0	0	0	0.83	0.74	0	3.70	1.11	1.05	8.72	16.25	32.43	33.87
1992	0	0	0	0	0	0	0	0	0	0	0	0	0	0.72	14.93	20.83	30.19
1993	0	0	0	0	0	0	0	0	0	0	0	1.92	0	1.30	5.88	4.17	13.33
1994	0	0	0	0	0.45	0	0	0	0	0	0	0.86	0	1.83	6.58	3.23	16.67
1995	0	0	0	0	0	0	0	0	0	0.63	0	1.55	1.11	2.76	8.00	7.69	28.00
1996	0	0	0	0	0	0	0	0	0	0	0.86	0.65	0.55	2.33	3.74	3.92	4.17
1997	0	0	0	0	0	0	0	0.36	0.34	0	0	0	0.41	0.72	5.19	14.58	12.00
1998	0	0	0	0	0	0	0	0	0.54	0.70	1.29	1.06	0.72	2.57	7.47	9.46	42.86
1999	0	0	0	0.36	0	0.24	0.27	0	0.28	0.30	0.54	1.33	0.90	4.20	10.55	15.45	32.35
2000	0	0	0	0	0	0.24	0.56	0	0.26	0.88	0	0.80	2.29	5.60	10.66	11.50	34.12
2001	0	0	0	0	0.57	0.49	0	0.24	0.48	0.27	0.49	1.19	6.27	5.94	15.74	23.31	44.55
2002	0	0	0	0	0	0	0	1.11	0.65	1.31	1.50	1.74	4.62	3.69	9.63	19.53	44.12
2003	0	0	0	0	0	0	0	0	0.19	0.52	0.48	0.94	0.27	1.70	5.16	9.23	33.13
2004	0	0	0	0	0	0.23	0	0	0	0	0	0.64	0.76	0.46	2.68	2.82	15.11
2005	0	0	0	0	0	0	0	0	0.17	0	0.36	0	0.25	0.78	2.59	2.98	8.87
2006	0	0	0	0	0	0	0	0	0	0	0.36	0	0.48	0.54	0.78	1.58	13.08
2007	0	0	0	0	0	0	0	0	0	0	0	0.30	0.23	0.19	0	0.88	14.81
2008	0	0	0.43	0.40	0.31	0.21	0.58	0.18	0.59	0.71	1.14	0.63	0.63	2.97	3.29	7.02	26.53
Summary	AAA	AA+	AA	AA−	A+	A	A−	BBB+	BBB	BBB−	BB+	BB	BB−	B+	B	B−	CCC to C
Mean	0	0	0.02	0.03	0.05	0.06	0.08	0.16	0.28	0.28	0.68	0.89	1.53	2.44	7.28	9.97	22.67
Median	0	0	0	0	0	0	0	0	0.08	0	0.18	0.83	0.86	2.06	6.27	7.69	22.25
Minimum	0	0	0	0	0	0	0	0	0	0	0	0	0	0	0	0	0
Maximum	0	0	0.43	0.40	0.57	0.49	0.78	1.11	1.40	1.33	3.70	3.06	7.04	8.72	16.25	32.43	44.55
Standard deviation	0	0	0.08	0.10	0.14	0.13	0.20	0.32	0.36	0.43	0.96	0.84	1.83	2.02	4.51	7.82	11.93

Standard & Poor's one-year global structured finance default rates by refined rating category, 1978–2008
Year	AAA	AA+	AA	AA−	A+	A	A−	BBB+	BBB	BBB−	BB+	BB	BB−	B+	B	B−	CCC to C
1993	0	0	0	0	0	0	0	0	0	0	0	0	0	0	6.25	0	0
1994	0	0	0	0	0	0	0	0	0	0	0	0	0	0	1.85	0	0
1995	0	0	0	0	0	0	0	0	0.43	0	0	0.98	0	0	0.95	0	52.63
1996	0	0	0	0	0	0.15	0	0	0	0	0	0.61	12.50		0	0	31.03
1997	0	0	0	0	0	0	0	0	0	0	0	0	0	0	0	0	20.69
1998	0	0	0	0	0	1.04	0.91	0	0.19	0	0	1.03	0	0	2.34	0	22.58
1999	0	0	0	0	0	0	0.77	0	0	0.39	0	0	0	0	1.54	0	19.35
2000	0	0	0	0	0	0	0	0	0.11	0	0	0.61	0	0	2.19	0	5.26
2001	0.05	0	0	0	0	0.12	0	2.22	0	0.86	0.83	0.55	0.91	2.00	2.69	3.27	26.87
2002	0	0	0.06	0	0.27	0.14	0	1.77	0.19	0.70	1.26	2.03	1.12	2.50	3.60	23.24	27.03
2003	0	0	0	0	0.19	0.03	0.16	0.20	0.60	0.50	0.75	0.84	1.43	3.28	1.64	5.15	32.58
2004	0	0	0	0	0	0	0	0	0.16	0.17	0.50	0.81	0.29	0.79	2.23	3.56	13.79
2005	0	0	0	0	0	0	0	0	0.08	0.06	0.15	0.14	0.45	0.33	1.34	2.53	16.08
2006	0	0	0	0	0	0	0	0	0.06	0.20	0	0.33	0.36	0.26	0.36	1.42	19.18
2007	0.04	0.03	0.07	0.08	0	0.10	0.21	0.48	0.47	1.27	5.07	1.61	1.53	0.68	1.55	1.47	24.11
2008	0.53	0.35	0.57	1.15	1.15	0.87	1.42	2.27	1.26	3.45	5.60	4.21	5.07	8.53	12.84	10.28	56.92
Summary	AAA	AA+	AA	AA−	A+	A	A−	BBB+	BBB	BBB−	BB+	BB	BB−	B+	B	B−	CCC to C
Mean	0.02	0.01	0.02	0.05	0.06	0.08	0.14	0.37	0.16	0.38	3.56	0.81	1.24	1.22	2.18	2.83	16.73
Median	0	0	0	0	0	0	0	0	0	0	0	0.61	0	0.26	1.55	0	17.63
Minimum	0	0	0	0	0	0	0	0	0	0	0	0	0	0	0	0	0
Maximum	0.53	0.35	0.57	1.15	1.15	1.04	1.42	2.27	1.26	3.45	5.6	4.21	12.50	8.53	12.84	23.24	56.92
Standard deviation	0.09	0.07	0.10	0.23	0.23	0.24	0.35	0.76	0.29	0.78	12.39	1.02	2.90	2.20	2.93	5.59	16.60

== See also ==
- Credit risk
- Default (finance)
- List of countries by credit rating
- AAA (video game industry)
