= Investor Protection and Securities Reform Act of 2010 =

Investor Protections: 2010, USA

Securities and Exchange Commission logo.

The Investor Protections and Improvements to the Regulation of Securities is a United States Act of Congress, which forms Title IX, sections 901 to 991 of the much broader and larger Dodd-Frank Wall Street Reform and Consumer Protection Act of 2010. Its main purpose is to revise the powers and structure of the Securities and Exchange Commission, credit rating organizations, and the relationships between customers and broker-dealers or investment advisers. This title calls for various studies and reports from the SEC and Government Accountability Office (GAO). This title contains nine subtitles.

== Subtitle A – Increasing Investor Protection ==
Subtitle A contains provisions:

- To prevent regulatory capture within the SEC and increase the influence of investors, the Act creates an Office of the Investor Advocate, an Investor Advisory Committee composed of 12-22 members of whom serve 4-year terms, and an ombudsman appointed by the Office of the Investor Advocate. The Investor Advisory Committee was actually created in 2009 and therefore predates the passage of the Act, but it is specifically authorized under the Act.
- SEC is specifically authorized to issue "point-of-sale disclosure" rules when retail investors purchase investment products or services; these disclosures include concise information on costs, risks, and conflicts of interest. This authorization follows up the SEC's failure to implement proposed point-of-sale disclosure rules in 2004 and 2005; These proposed rules generated opposition because they were perceived as burdensome to broker-dealers. For example, they would require oral disclosures for telephone transactions, were not satisfied by cheap internet or email disclosures, and could allow the customer to request disclosures specific to the amount of their investment. In determining the disclosure rules, the Act authorizes the SEC to do "investor testing" and rely on experts to study financial literacy among retail investors.

Subtitle A provides authority for the SEC to impose regulations requiring "fiduciary duty" by broker-dealers and investment advisers to their customers. Although the Act does not create such a duty immediately, the Act authorizes the SEC to establish such a standard and requires that the SEC study the standards of care which broker-dealers and investment advisers apply to their customers and report to Congress on the results within 6 months. Under the law, commission and limited product range would not violate the duty and broker-dealers would not have a continuing duty after the investment advice is given.

== Subtitle B – Increasing Regulatory Enforcement and Remedies ==
Subtitle B gives the SEC further powers of enforcement. This includes a "whistleblower bounty program" which is based upon a similar program established by the IRS in 2006; the program allows persons who provide information which leads to a successful SEC enforcement to receive 10 to 30% of the monetary sanctions over $1 million. Section 921 under the title allows the SEC to prohibit pre-dispute mandatory binding arbitration. Section 929I exempts the SEC from disclosing information obtained pursuant to 17(b) of the Securities Exchange Act of 1934 or information "based upon or derived from" such information "obtained by the Commission for use in furtherance of the purposes of this title, including surveillance, risk assessments, or other regulatory and oversight activities" – meaning information derived from examinations. The SEC rejected a Freedom of Information Act request on July 27, 2010 based upon this new law; while the SEC has stated that this legal change is necessary for registrants to comply with the examinations, the provision has been criticized for allowing the SEC to avoid the typical disclosure rules applicable to federal agencies.

Importantly, section 921I amends SEC Act of 1934 and the Investment Company Act of 1940 to allow the Securities Exchange Commission to not disclose records or information that have been obtained for uses such as "surveillance, risk assessments, or other regulatory and oversight activities" except it may not withhold information from judicial or congressional inquiry. The effective result of this change is that the US Freedom of Information Act no longer applies to the SEC; the SEC can refuse to supply documents it deems as being part of its regulatory and oversight activities. Previously, the SEC used a narrower existing exemption for trade secrets when refusing Freedom of Information Requests.

== Subtitle C – Improvements to the Regulation of Credit Rating Agencies ==
Recognizing credit ratings issued by credit rating agencies, including nationally recognized statistical rating organizations (NRSROs), are matters of national public interest, that credit rating agencies are critical "gatekeepers" in the debt market central to capital formation, investor confidence, and the efficient performance of the United States economy, Congress expanded regulation of credit rating agencies.

Subtitle C cites findings of conflicts of interest and inaccuracies during the recent financial crisis contributed significantly to the mismanagement of risks by financial institutions and investors which in turn adversely impacted the health of the United States economy as factors necessitating increased accountability and transparency by credit rating agencies.

Subtitle C mandates the creation by the SEC of an Office of Credit Ratings (OCR) to provide oversight over NRSROs and enhanced regulation of such entities.

Enhanced regulations of nationally recognized statistical rating organizations (NRSROs) include:

- NRSROs are required to establish, maintain, enforce and document an effective internal control structure governing the implementation of and adherence to policies, procedures, and methodologies for determining credit ratings.
- Submit to the OCR an annual internal control report.
- Adhere to rules established by the Commission to prevent sales and marketing considerations from influencing the ratings issued by a NRSRO.
- Policies and procedures with regard to (1) certain employment transitions to avoid conflicts of interest, (2) the processing of complaints regarding NRSRO noncompliance, and (3) notification to users of identified significant errors are required.
- Compensation of the compliance officer may not be linked to the financial performance of the NRSRO.
- The duty to report to appropriate authorities credible allegations of unlawful conduct by issuers of securities.
- The consideration of credible information about an issuer from sources other than the issuer or underwriter which is potentially significant to a rating decision.
- The Act establishes corporate governance, organizational, and management of conflict of interest guidelines. A minimum of 2 independent directors is required.

Subtitle C grants authority to the Commission to temporarily suspend or permanently revoke the registration of an NRSRO with respect to a particular class or subclass of securities if after notice and hearing the NRSRO lacks the resources to produce credit ratings with integrity. Additional key provisions of the Act are:

- The Commission shall prescribe rules with respect to credit rating procedures and methodologies.
- OCR is required to conduct an examination of each NRSRO at least annually and shall produce a public inspection report.
- To facilitate transparency of credit ratings performance, the Commission shall require NRSROs to publicly disclose information on initial and revised credit ratings issued, including the credit rating methodology utilized and data relied on, to enable users to evaluate NRSROs.

In addition, Subtitle C requires the SEC to conduct a study on strengthening NRSRO independence and recommends the SEC utilize its rulemaking authority to establish guidelines to prevent improper conflicts of interest arising from the performance of services unrelated to the issuance of credit ratings such as consulting, advisory, and other services. The Act requires the Comptroller General of the United States to conduct a study on alternative business models for compensating NRSROs

== Subtitle D – Improvements to the Asset-Backed Securitization Process ==
In Subtitle D, the term "Asset-Backed Security" is defined as a fixed-income or other security collateralized by any type of self-liquidating financial asset, such as a loan, lease, mortgage, that allows the owner of the Asset-Backed Security to receive payments that depend on the cash flow of the (ex.) loan. For regulation purposes, Asset-Backed Securities are described as including (but not limited to):

- collateralized mortgage obligation
- collateralized debt obligation
- collateralized bond obligation
- collateralized debt obligation of asset-backed securities
- collateralized debt obligation of collateralized debt obligations

For regulation purposes, Asset-Backed Securities do not include securities issued by a finance subsidiary to its parent company or company controlled by the parent company. Within nine months of enactment, rules and regulations are to be issued regarding requiring any securitizer to retain an economic interest in a portion of the credit risk. Regulations for assets that are:

- Residential in Nature – are jointly prescribed by the SEC, the Secretary of Housing and Urban Development, and the Federal Housing Finance Agency
- In General – the Federal Banking agencies and the SEC

Specifically, securitizers are:

- prohibited from hedging or transferring the credit risk it is required to retain with respect to the assets
- required to retain not less than 5% of the credit risk for an asset that is not a qualified residential mortgage,
- for commercial mortgages or other types of assets, regulations may provide for retention of less than 5% of the credit risk, provided that there is also disclosure

The regulations are to prescribe several asset classes with separate rules for securitizers, including but not limited to, residential mortgages, commercial mortgages, commercial loans, and auto loans. The SEC and the Federal banking agencies may jointly issue exemptions, exceptions, and adjustments to the rules issues provided that they:

- help ensure high quality underwriting standards for the securitizers and originators of assets that are securitized or available for securitization
- encourage appropriate risk management practices by the securitizers and originators of assets, improve the access of consumers and businesses to credit on reasonable terms, or otherwise be in the public interest and for the protection of investors.

Additionally, the following institutions and programs are exempt:

- Farm Credit System
- Qualified Residential Mortgages (which are to be jointly defined by The Federal banking agencies, SEC, Secretary of Housing and Urban Development, and the Director of the Federal Housing Finance Agency)

The SEC may classify issuers and prescribe requirements appropriate for each class of issuers of asset-backed securities. The SEC shall also adopt regulations requiring each issuer of an asset-backed security to disclose, for each tranche or class of security, information that will help identify each asset backing that security. Within six months of enactment, the SEC shall issue regulations prescribing representations and warranties in the marketing of asset-backed securities:

- require each Nationally Recognized Statistical Rating Organization to include in any report accompanying a credit rating a description of:
  - the representations, warranties, and enforcement mechanisms available to investors
  - how they differ from the representations, warranties, and enforcement mechanisms in issuances of similar securities
- require any securitizer to disclose fulfilled and unfulfilled repurchase requests across all trusts aggregated by the securitizer, so that investors may identify asset originators with clear underwriting deficiencies.

The SEC shall also prescribe a due diligence analysis/review of the assets underlying the security, and a disclosure of that analysis.

== Subtitle E – Accountability and Executive Compensation ==
Within one year of enactment, the SEC must issue rules that direct the national securities exchanges and associations to prohibit the listing of any security of an issuer that is not in compliance with the requirements of the compensation sections. At least once every 3 years, a public corporation is required to submit to a shareholder vote the approval of executive compensation. And once every six years there should be a submitted to shareholder vote whether the required approval of executive compensation should be more often that once every three years. Shareholders may disapprove any golden parachute compensation to executives via a non-binding vote. Shareholders must be informed of the relationship between executive compensation actually paid and the financial performance of the issuer, taking into account any change in the value of the shares of stock and dividends of the issuer and any distributions as well as:

- the median of the annual total compensation of all employees of the issuer, except the chief executive officer (or any equivalent position)
- the annual total compensation of the chief executive officer, or any equivalent position
- the ratio of the amount of the medium of the annual total with the total CEO compensation

The company shall also disclose to shareholders whether any employee or member of the board of directors is permitted to purchase financial instruments that are designed to hedge or offset any decrease in the market value of equity securities that are part of a compensation package. Members of the Board of Director's Compensation Committee shall be an independent member of the board of directors, a compensation consultant or legal council, as provided by rules issued by the SEC. Federal regulators, within 9 months of enactment of this legislation, shall proscribe regulations that a covered company shall disclose to the appropriate Federal regulator, all incentive-based compensation arrangements with sufficient information such that the regulator may determine:

- whether the compensation package could lead to material financial loss to the company
- provides the employee/officer with excessive compensation, fees, or benefits

== Subtitle F – Improvements to the Management of the Securities and Exchange Commission ==
Within Subtitle F are various managerial changes intended to increase the efficiency of the agency will be implemented, including reports on internal controls, a triennial report on personnel management by the head of the GAO (the Comptroller General of the United States), a hotline for employees to report problems in the agency, a report by the GAO on the oversight of National Securities Associations, and a report by a consultant on reform of the SEC. Under Subtitle J of the title, the SEC will be funded through "match funding" which will in effect mean that its budget will be funded through filing fees.

== Subtitle G – Strengthening Corporate Governance ==
Subtitle G provides that the SEC may issue rules and regulations that include a requirement that permit a shareholder to use a company's proxy solicitation materials for the purpose of nominating individuals to membership on the board of directors. The company is also required to inform investors the reason why the same person is to serve as chairman of the board of directors and chief executive officer, or why different individuals are to serve as chairman of the board of directors and chief executive officer.

== Subtitles H – Municipal Securities ==
This provision of the statute creates a guarantee of trust which correlates a municipal advisor (who provide advice to state and local governments regarding investments) with any municipal bodies which provides services. Also it alters the make-up of the Municipal Securities Rulemaking Board ("MSRB") and mandates that the Comptroller General conducts studies relating to municipal disclosure and municipal markets. The new MSRB will be composed of fifteen individuals, have the authority to regulate municipal advisors, and be permitted to charge fees regarding trade information. Also, it is mandated that the Comptroller General makes several recommendations, which must be submitted to Congress within at most 24 months of enactment of the Act.

== Subtitle I – Public Company Accounting Oversight Board, Portfolio Margining, and Other Matters ==
Subtitle I is concerned with the establishment of a Public Company Accounting Oversight Board (or PCAOB). The PCAOB has the authority to establish oversight of certified public accounting firms. The Subtitle I provision allows the SEC to authorize necessary rules with respect to securities for borrowing. The SEC shall, as deemed appropriate, exercise transparency within this sector of the financial industry. A council of Inspectors General On Financial Oversight, consisting of several members of federal agencies (such as the United States Department of the Treasury, the FDIC, and the Federal Housing Finance Agency) will be established. The council will more easily allow the sharing of data with inspectors general (which includes members by proxy or in person from the SEC and CFTC) with a focus on dealings which may be applicable to the general financial sector at large with focus on the improvement of financial oversight.

== See also ==
- US corporate law
