= China Chengxin Credit Rating Group =

International credit group China (1992)

- Industry: Bond credit ratings
- Founded: 1992
- Headquarters: Beijing China Merchants International Financial Center; Beijing, China
- Key people: Dr. MAO Zhenhua (Chairman)
- Owner: Moody's Ratings (30%)
- Website: www.ccx.com.cn

China Chengxin Credit Rating Group (known as China Chengxin, or CCXI) was founded in Beijing on 8 October 1992 through the incorporation of China Chengxin Credit Management Co Ltd (renamed as China Chengxin Credit Management Co. Ltd. in 2002), which is the first nationwide credit rating company of China. Subsequently, it formed subsidiaries and established branches across China, including China Chengxin International Credit Rating Company Limited (the joint venture credit rating company among China Chengxin Securities Rating Company Limited, Fitch Ratings and International Finance Corporation established in 1999). The share-holder structure of the joint venture company was changed in 2006 when Moody's came in to take over the equity positions of Fitch and the supranational institution. The company is one of the few major credit rating agencies currently operating in China.

According to CCXI's announcement, China Chengxin International Credit Rating Co., Ltd is 30% owned by Moody's Corporation via Moody's China (B.V.I.) Limited, and 70% owned by Beijing Zhixiang Information Management Consulting Co., Ltd, which is believed as ultimately owned by Mr. Mao Zhenhua and his family through a complex holding structure.

China Chengxin Credit Management Co. Ltd. went to Hong Kong to set up its subsidiary, China Chengxin (Asia Pacific) Credit Ratings Company Limited, which received the Type Ten License from Hong Kong Securities and Futures Commission on 28 June 2012 and was an internationalization attempt after Dagong Global's expansion into the United States in 2010, which was considered eventually failed partially for political causes.

China Chengxin Credit Rating Group has branches and subsidiaries operating in Beijing, Shanghai, Hong Kong, Shenzhen, Fujian, Wuhan, Shandong, Liaoning, Tianjin, Jiangsu, Zhejiang, Shanxi and Shaanxi. In 2024, the number of CCXI's existing offices are 5, namely Beijing, Shanghai, Wuhan, Shenzhen and Hong Kong.

In 2023, Yan Yan the long serving president of CCXI was replaced while remaining as Chairman.

== History ==
1992–1999: Founding period

In 1992, encouraged by the talks of the then Chinese leader Deng Xiaoping during his tour to the southern China, MAO Zhenhua, like many young people of China, started his private venture to form a credit rating company. Upon the approval given by People's Bank of China, MAO was successful in establishing the first Chinese credit rating company, China Chengxin Securities Credit Rating Company Limited under the Chinese corporation rules and regulations.

The company worked out the first set of credit rating system and methodology in China, which was assessed and accredited by the group of experts from the Finance and Economic Committee and Law Committee under the People's Congress, People's Bank of China, National Planning Commission, banks and securities house.

1999–2005 Take-off period

As the Chinese capital markets had just started growing, IFC, an agencies of World Bank Group, made efforts to help the Chinese capital markets to develop, including the establishment of an effective and efficient credit rating industry. After several years' endeavour, this supranational institution succeeded in pulling together China Chengxin Securities Credit Rating Company, Fitch IBCA (now Fitch Ratings) and itself to form China's first credit rating joint venture company, China Chengxin International Credit Rating Company Limited in August 1999.

2006–2011 Advancing period

The Chinese capital markets were further reformed in 2005, leading to the fast development of the debt market. Moody's moved in to buy up to the regulatory cap of 49% share of China Chengxin International Credit Rating Company Limited from the local share-holders in September 2006. Moody's added additional management and technical support on rating methodologies and training of analysts to the joint venture company.

China Chengxin Securities Credit Rating Company Limited was renamed as China Chengxin Credit Management Company Limited to turn it into a holding company of all subsidiaries and branches formed or to be formed. Subsequently, China Chengxin Credit Rating Management Company Limited has subsidiaries and branches providing credit rating services in Beijing, Shanghai, Hong Kong, Shenzhen, Fujian, Wuhan, Shandong, Liaoning, Tianjin, Jiangsu, Zhejiang and Shanxi.

Owing to its first comer status and expertise acquired from the two international credit rating agencies, respectively. The China Chengxin Credit Rating Group can always capture the largest overall market share in the domestic market.

2012– Going out

Following the trend of internationalization of the Chinese currency, China Chengxin Credit Management Company Limited established its subsidiary in Hong Kong, China Chengxin (Asia Pacific) Credit Ratings Company Limited, which received the Type Ten License from Hong Kong Securities and Futures Commission on 28 June 2012, thus became the first Chinese credit rating company going out of mainland China to do credit rating business in the international capital markets.

== China Chengxin (Asia Pacific) ==
On 28 June 2012, China Chengxin (Asia Pacific) Credit Ratings Company Limited ("CCXAP") was successful in applying for the type ten operating licence from Hong Kong Securities and Futures Commission, thus, became the first licensed Chinese credit rating agency to operate in the international credit rating market.

== "Rating Suspension" Controversy ==
In June 2026, amid heightened regulatory scrutiny of inflated AAA ratings in China's corporate bond market, China Chengxin briefly published a policy for "suspending" the issuance of ratings on certain bonds for three months or longer. The policy was subsequently removed, prompting questions over the agency's seemingly "halfhearted response" to the regulatory probes. China Chengxin later told local media that the proposed suspension was unrelated to regulatory scrutiny of high ratings.

== Suspension of License in China ==
On 29 December 2020, CCXI was suspended by NAFMII, a Chinese interbank market regulator, for three months out of a high-profile bond default case of Yongcheng Coal & Electricity Holding Group. The Chinese regulator discovered that China Chengxin had failed to properly conduct on-site due diligence on Yongcheng or adequately disclose risks, and urged the rating agency to take corrective steps.

During the suspension, CCXI is not allowed to conduct new rating business for debt financing instruments.

In 2024, CCXI is allegedly under an on-going investigation by China Securities Regulatory Commission amongst financial intermediaries who provided financial services to Evergrande Group. According to public information, CCXI assigned "AAA" ratings to five bonds issued by Evergrande since 2020.

As the Evergrande scandal continue to ferment, on 5 July 2024, the Office of the State Council of China published "Opinions on Further Improving the Comprehensive Punishment and Prevention of Financial Fraud in the Capital Market", issued jointly by the China Securities Regulatory Commission, the Ministry of Public Security, the Ministry of Finance, the People's Bank of China, the National Financial Regulatory Administration and the State Asset Supervision and Administration Committee of the State Council. The article 15 states "Strengthen the "gatekeeper" responsibilities of intermediaries. .... Improve the credit records of intermediary agencies and employees, and urge relevant agencies and personnel to be diligent and responsible. Intermediaries that have committed serious violations of laws and regulations shall be suspended or prohibited from engaging in securities service business in accordance with the law, and systems such as revocation of practice licenses and prohibition of employees shall be strictly implemented." While the Evergrande-related investigation to CCXI is on-going and not yet concluded, the Chinese public is expecting the intermediary responsibility to enforced in a strong hand manner after the announcement.

== Ultimate Owner of CCXI ==
According to Wuhan University's alumni page, Mao Zhenhua was born in 1964 in Shishou, Hubei. He received his bachelor degree from economics department of School of Economics and Management, Wuhan University in 1983. He was awarded the doctoral degree in economics from Wuhan University in 1996.

Allegedly, in the early age of Mao's business career, he had been detained and subject to official investigation for 8 months.

Mao has been vocal in macro economy issues in China. In 2018, a video of Mao criticizing the Chinese government for "taking advantage of him" and "fooling him" went viral in China. The criticism was in relation to various issues of a commercial ski site that Mao owns. The episode is widely known in China as "Yabuli-gate" or "Mao Zhenhua-Gate".

== Regulatory approval and membership ==
China Chengxin Credit Rating Groups' subsidies and branches obtained license from all the regulators in China such as People's Bank of China, China Insurance Regulatory Commission, National Development and Reform Commission and China Securities Regulatory Commission.

China

- 1997 PBOC Nationally Recognized Bond Credit Rating Agency
- 2003 CIRC Recognized Credit Rating Agency
- 2003 NDRC Approved Credit Rating Agency
- 2005 PBOC Recognized Credit Rating Agency in Interbank Market
- 2007 CSRC Approved Credit Rating Agency
- Member of Securities Association of China
- Member of National Association of Financial Market Institutional Investors (NAFMII)

Hong Kong

- 2012 SFC Type 10: Providing credit rating services
