= Egan-Jones Ratings Company =

NRSRO credit rating agency

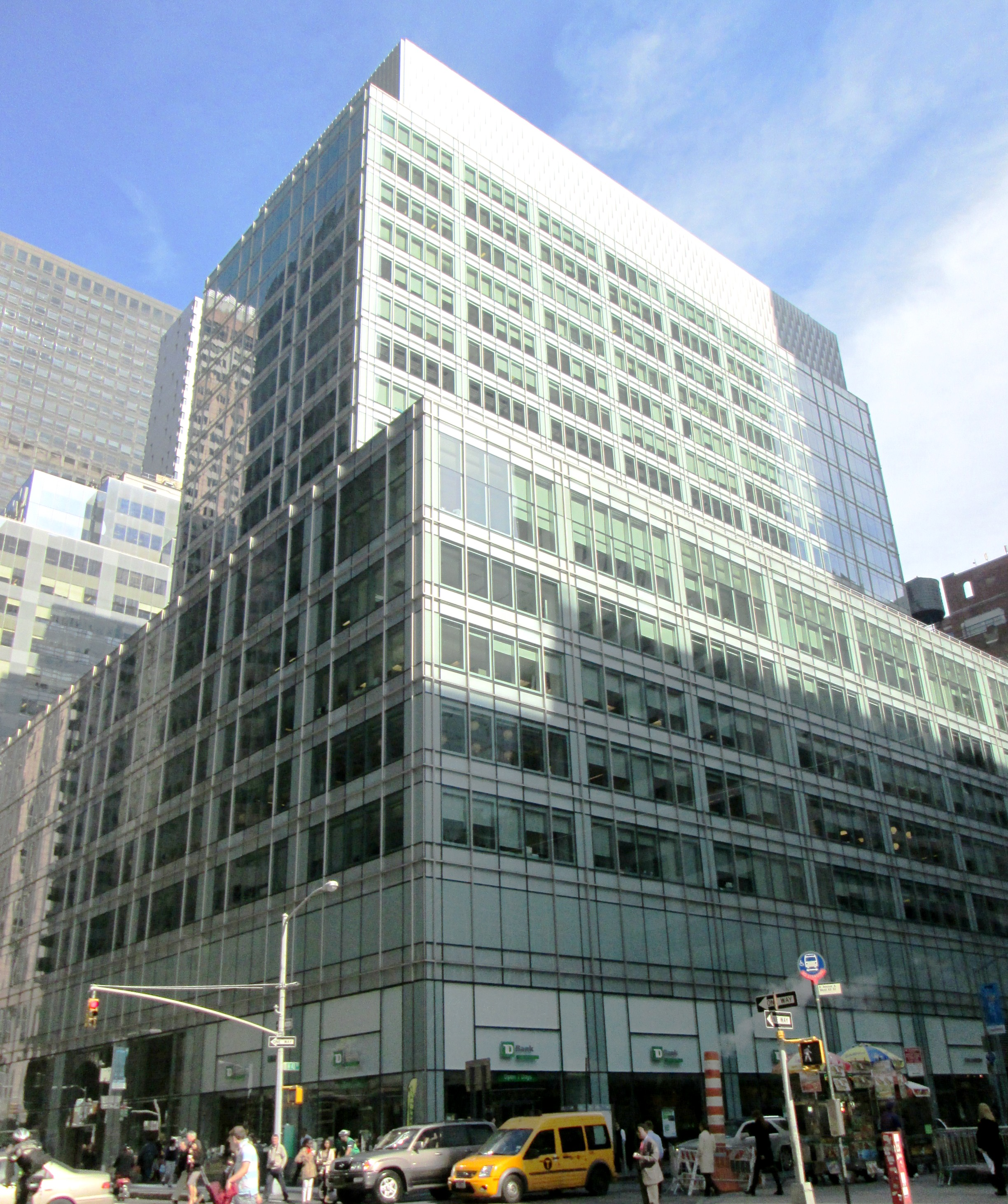
- Egan Jones maintains an office in the Hippodrome Building, New York, New York
- Company type: Private
- Industry: Financial services
- Founded: 1995; 31 years ago
- Founders: Sean Egan; Bruce Jones
- Headquarters: King of Prussia, Pennsylvania, United States
- Area served: Global
- Key people: Sean Egan (CEO)
- Services: Private debt ratings; Public bond ratings; Proxy advisory services
- Number of employees: 50-201 (2024)
- Website: egan-jones.com

Egan-Jones Ratings Company is an American credit rating agency that is a nationally recognized statistical rating organization (NRSRO) founded in 1995 to provide "timely, accurate credit ratings." Egan-Jones rates the credit worthiness of issuers looking to raise capital in private credit markets across a range of asset classes.

Typical issuers of rated securities include banks, asset managers, insurance companies, and other financial institutions.

Based in Haverford, Pennsylvania, Egan-Jones positions itself as unique among NRSROs for being primarily investor-supported, a structure designed to minimize the potential for conflicts of interest in assessing credit quality. Egan-Jones also provides ESG and proxy advisory services.

== History ==
Sean Egan founded the research firm Red Flag Research in 1992 while working as a banker at Chemical Bank. He hired Bruce Jones from Moody's who was working as an analyst, and renamed the company Egan-Jones. In December 1995, the company issued its first rating.

The firm was granted NRSRO status on December 21, 2007, making it the ninth such organization to be recognized by the SEC. In 2014, Egan-Jones became certified by the EU ESMA as a credit rating agency. In 2021, Egan-Jones became listed on the UK Financial Conduct Authority register as a certified credit rating agency. The company is recognized by the National Association of Insurance Commissioners as a credit rating provider.

The effectiveness of Egan-Jones' investor-supported credit ratings has been measured by third parties, including Richard D. Johnson of the Kansas City Federal Reserve, the Stanford Graduate School of Business and the University of Michigan's Business School.

Sean Egan, principal of Egan-Jones Rating, appeared before Congress on October 22, 2008, and argued that issuers of complex securities "shopped" for ratings which resulted in a race to the bottom in terms of credit transparency. Rather than "beat up Moody's and S&P for behavior" they'd been financially motivated to pursue, the government needs to support a new business model paid for by investors, not issuers, to support the funding ecosystem which has so severely broken down, he asserted. Egan-Jones on July 16, 2011, became the first NRSRO to cut its rating on the United States from AAA to AA+. On April 5, 2012, Egan-Jones downgraded the credit ranking of the US for the second time, from AA+ (Excellent) to AA (Very Good) assuming that the debt would reach $16.7 trillion by the end of 2012 while the GDP would not grow further than a $15.7 trillion limit, and the debt-to-GDP ratio would reach 112% of the national GDP, which would be the highest level since the WW II. On September 14, 2012, Egan-Jones downgraded the credit rating of the US for the third time from AA to AA−, the lowest of what is considered "high grade", as a reaction to QE3.

Egan-Jones was also the first to downgrade WorldCom and Enron. Companies such as Lehman Brothers, MBIA, IndyMac, and New Century, all encountered major financial difficulties after being downgraded by Egan-Jones.

Egan-Jones' CEO, Sean Egan, was named by Fortune Magazine as the number one person for warning about the 2008 financial crisis.

== Services ==
=== Credit ratings ===
==== Private placement credit ratings ====
As a credit rating agency, Egan-Jones issues credit ratings for private instruments for a variety of issuers. Transactions include asset-based financings, corporate obligations, financial institution financings, funds, infrastructure, middle-market loans, project finance, leases, and real estate.

==== Unsolicited credit ratings ====
Egan-Jones offers unsolicited ratings on a subscription basis to provide investors periodic updates on public companies’ credit quality. Egan-Jones has issued 20,000+ unsolicited credit ratings.

=== Proxy advisory ===
Since 2002, Egan-Jones has offered independent proxy advisory services for institutional investors including insurance companies, registered investment advisors, pension funds, Taft-Hartley funds, and family offices. The firm covers all client equity holdings, and its recommendations are based on proxy voting guidelines chosen by the client.

== Ratings scale ==
According to Egan-Jones' methodology, "ratings are opinions that reflect the creditworthiness of an issuer, a security, or an obligation. They are opinions regarding estimated loss based on forward-looking measurements that assess an issuer’s ability and willingness to make payments on outstanding obligations (whether principal, interest, dividend, or distributions) with respect to the terms of an obligation."

=== Long-term ratings scale ===
The ratings from 'AA' to 'CCC' may be modified by the addition of a plus (+) or minus (−) sign to show relative standing within the major rating categories.

Global Long-Term Rating Scale
Investment grade
Rating	Definition
AAA	Egan-Jones expects AAA ratings to have the highest level of creditworthiness with the lowest sensitivity to evolving credit conditions.
AA	Egan-Jones expects AA ratings to have a higher level of creditworthiness with very low sensitivity to evolving credit conditions.
A	Egan-Jones expects A ratings to have the high level of creditworthiness with low sensitivity to evolving credit conditions.
BBB	Egan-Jones expects BBB ratings to have the moderate level of creditworthiness with moderate sensitivity to evolving credit conditions.
Speculative grade
BB	Egan-Jones expects BB ratings to have a low level of creditworthiness with high sensitivity to evolving credit conditions.
B	Egan-Jones expects B ratings to have a lower level of creditworthiness with higher sensitivity to evolving credit conditions.
CCC	Egan-Jones expects CCC ratings to have a lowest level of creditworthiness with highest sensitivity to evolving credit conditions.
CC	Egan-Jones expects CC ratings to have the lowest level of creditworthiness and some expectation of recovery.
C	Egan-Jones expects C ratings to have the lowest level of creditworthiness and little expectation of recovery.
D	Egan-Jones expects D ratings to have the no determinable level of creditworthiness with uncertain recovery expectations.

=== Short-term ratings scale ===
According to Egan-Jones' methodology, short-term ratings are "assigned to those obligations considered short-term in their relevant markets. In the U.S., for example, that means obligations with an original maturity of no more than 365 days (including commercial paper). Short-term ratings are also used to indicate the creditworthiness of an obligor with respect to possible "put" features on long-term obligations."

Global Short-Term Rating Scale
Investment grade
Rating	Definition
A-1	Highest short-term creditworthiness
A-2	Higher short-term creditworthiness
A-3	Moderate short-term creditworthiness
Speculative grade
B	Low short-term creditworthiness
C	Lowest short-term creditworthiness
D	No discernable short-term creditworthiness

== 2012 SEC charges ==
=== Charges ===
The SEC warned Egan-Jones in October 2011 of a possible enforcement action. On April 24, 2012, the SEC charged Sean Egan with numerous offenses including: making false and misleading statements in the firm's application to become a Nationally Recognized Rating Agency, violations of conflicts-of-interest and record keeping, and falsely stating that he was unaware if his paid clients were long or short specific securities that Egan-Jones rated. The Securities and Exchange Commission issued charges against the company, and its founder, Sean Egan, for "material misrepresentations and omissions in the company’s July 2008 application to register as a Nationally Recognized Statistical Rating Organization (NRSRO) for issuers of asset-backed securities (ABS) and government securities" as well as "material misrepresentations in other submissions furnished to the SEC and violations of record-keeping and conflict-of-interest provisions governing NRSROs." The SEC alleged that among other violations Egan-Jones "allowed two analysts to participate in determining the credit ratings for issuers whose securities they owned", and "also (1) failed to make or retain a record of the procedures and methodologies it used to determine credit ratings".

=== Egan-Jones response ===
The material that we put down was accurate to the best of our ability. If we had to do it again today I'd say exactly the same thing.
—Sean Egan, CEO, in an interview on CNBC

Egan stated that "Our job is to get back to work and focus on providing timely, accurate ratings and research. This will not have any effect on the firm's independence or our commitment to call credit quality as we see it, regardless of issuer." Alan Futerfas, the firm's lawyer, denied the allegations stating that "it’s clear the SEC has a bias against independent firms" noting that the SEC was using "hyper-technical" claims and that "these filings, new forms started in 2007, are subject to significant interpretation," and that "the firm used good faith and answered [questions on the forms] as best as it could." Futerfas noted that "not one word in the [SEC's order] questions the quality, integrity and timeliness of the Egan-Jones ratings" and criticized the SEC for failing to take action against major NSROs which had "inflated their structured debt, rated junk AAA, and brought down the American economy, according to Congressional reports." The SEC did not respond to Futerfas's remarks.

=== Settlement ===
On Jan. 22, 2013, the SEC announced that Egan-Jones had agreed to settle charges that they made willful and material misstatements and omissions when registering to become a NRSRO for asset-backed and government securities. Under the terms of the agreement, the firm was barred from rating government and asset-backed securities as a NRSRO for at least eighteen months.
