= Spread Research =

French credit rating agency

Spread Research SAS is a French credit rating agency and independent credit research company.

The company was founded in 2004 and in 2013 became the first French credit rating agency to be authorised. The company is based in Lyon, France, and has a presence in London and Paris. Spread Research has been certified as credit rating agency by the European Securities and Markets Authority (ESMA) since mid-2013, allowing the company to operate in Europe.

As of 2013, the company had 15 employees. In France, until 2013, only the branches of Standard and Poor's, Moody's and Fitch Ratings were certified by the ESMA. Spread Research operates under an investor-pays model, rather than being paid by rated companies.

Spread Research has been awarded "Top 5 Best Credit Research" by Credit Magazine in 2010.
