= Credit rating agency =

Company that assigns credit ratings

A credit rating agency (CRA, also called a ratings service) is a company that assigns credit ratings, which rate a debtor's ability to pay back debt by making timely principal and interest payments and the likelihood of default. An agency may rate the creditworthiness of issuers of debt obligations, of debt instruments, and in some cases, of the servicers of the underlying debt, but not of individual consumers.

Other forms of a rating agency include environmental, social and corporate governance (ESG) rating agencies and the Chinese Social Credit System.

The debt instruments rated by CRAs include government bonds, corporate bonds, CDs, municipal bonds, preferred stock, and collateralized securities, such as mortgage-backed securities and collateralized debt obligations.

The issuers of the obligations or securities may be companies, special purpose entities, state or local governments, non-profit organizations, or sovereign nations. A credit rating facilitates the trading of securities on international markets. It affects the interest rate that a security pays out, with higher ratings leading to lower interest rates. Individual consumers are rated for creditworthiness not by credit rating agencies but by credit bureaus (also called consumer reporting agencies or credit reference agencies), which issue credit scores.

The value of credit ratings for securities has been widely questioned. Hundreds of billions of securities that were given the agencies' highest ratings were downgraded to junk during the 2008 financial crisis. Rating downgrades during the Euro area crisis were blamed by EU officials for accelerating the crisis.

Credit rating is a highly concentrated industry, with the "Big Three" credit rating agencies controlling approximately 94% of the ratings business. Standard & Poor's (S&P) controls 50.0% of the global market with Moody's Investors Service controlling 31.7%, and Fitch Ratings controlling a further 12.5%. They are externalized sell-side functions for the marketing of securities.

== History ==
=== Early history ===
When the United States began to expand to the west and other parts of the country, so did the distance of businesses to their customers. When businesses were close to those who purchased goods or services from them, it was easy for the merchants to extend credit to them, due to their proximity and the fact that merchants knew their customers personally and knew whether or not they would be able to pay them back. As trading distances increased, merchants no longer personally knew their customers and became wary of extending credit to people who they did not know in fear of them not being able to pay them back. Business owners' hesitation to extend credit to new customers led to the birth of the credit reporting industry.

Mercantile credit agencies—the precursors of today's rating agencies—were established after the Panic of 1837. These agencies rated the ability of merchants to pay their debts and consolidated these ratings in published guides. The first such agency was established in 1841 by Lewis Tappan in New York City. It was subsequently acquired by Robert Dun, who published its first ratings guide in 1859. Another early agency, John Bradstreet, formed in 1849 and published a ratings guide in 1857.

Credit rating agencies originated in the United States in the early 1900s, when ratings began to be applied to securities, specifically those related to the railroad bond market. In the United States, the construction of extensive railroad systems had led to the development of corporate bond issues to finance them, and therefore a bond market several times larger than in other countries. The bond markets in the Netherlands and Britain had been established longer but tended to be small, and revolved around sovereign governments that were trusted to honor their debts. Companies were founded to provide investors with financial information on the growing railroad industry, including Henry Varnum Poor's publishing company, which produced a publication compiling financial data about the railroad and canal industries. Following the Panic of 1907, demand rose for such independent market information, in particular for independent analyses of bond creditworthiness. In 1909, financial analyst John Moody issued a publication focused solely on railroad bonds. His ratings became the first to be published widely in an accessible format, and his company was the first to charge subscription fees to investors.

In 1913, the ratings publication by Moody's underwent two significant changes: it expanded its focus to include industrial firms and utilities, and it began to use a letter-rating system. For the first time, public securities were rated using a system borrowed from the mercantile credit rating agencies, using letters to indicate their creditworthiness. In the next few years, antecedents of the "Big Three" credit rating agencies were established. Poor's Publishing Company began issuing ratings in 1916, Standard Statistics Company in 1922, and the Fitch Publishing Company in 1924.

=== Post-Depression era ===
In the United States, the rating industry grew and consolidated rapidly following the passage of the Glass-Steagall act of 1933 and the separation of the securities business from banking. As the market grew beyond that of traditional investment banking institutions, new investors again called for increased transparency, leading to the passage of new, mandatory disclosure laws for issuers, and the creation of the Securities and Exchange Commission (SEC). In 1936, regulation was introduced to prohibit banks from investing in bonds determined by "recognized rating manuals" (the forerunners of credit rating agencies) to be "speculative investment securities" ("junk bonds", in modern terminology). US banks were permitted to hold only "investment grade" bonds, and it was the ratings of Fitch, Moody's, Poor's, and Standard that legally determined which bonds were which. State insurance regulators approved similar requirements in the following decades.

From 1930 to 1980, the bonds and ratings of them were primarily relegated to American municipalities and American blue chip industrial firms. International "sovereign bond" rating shrivelled during the Great Depression to a handful of the most creditworthy countries, after a number of defaults of bonds issued by governments such as Germany's.

In the late 1960s and 1970s, ratings were extended to commercial paper and bank deposits. Also during that time, major agencies changed their business model by beginning to charge bond issuers as well as investors. The reasons for this change included a growing free rider problem related to the increasing availability of inexpensive photocopy machines and the increased complexity of the financial markets.

The rating agencies added levels of gradation to their rating systems. In 1973, Fitch added plus and minus symbols to its existing letter-rating system. The following year, Standard and Poor's did the same, and Moody's began using numbers for the same purpose in 1982.

=== Growth of bond market ===
The end of the Bretton Woods system in 1971 led to the liberalization of financial regulations and the global expansion of capital markets in the 1970s and 1980s. In 1975, SEC rules began explicitly referencing credit ratings. For example, the commission changed its minimum capital requirements for broker-dealers, allowing smaller reserves for higher-rated bonds; the rating would be done by "nationally recognized statistical ratings organizations" (NRSROs). This referred to the "Big Three", but in time ten agencies (later six, due to consolidation) were identified by the SEC as NRSROs.

Rating agencies also grew in size and profitability as the number of issuers accessing the debt markets grew exponentially, both in the United States and abroad. By 2009 the worldwide bond market (total debt outstanding) reached an estimated $82.2 trillion, in 2009 dollars.

=== 1980s–present ===
Two economic trends of the 1980s and 90s that brought significant expansion for the global capital market were

- the move away from "intermediated" financing (bank loans) toward cheaper and longer-term "disintermediated" financing (tradable bonds and other fixed income securities), and
- the global move away from state intervention and state-led industrial adjustment toward economic liberalism based on (among other things) global capital markets and arms-length relations between government and industry.

More debt securities meant more business for the Big Three agencies, which many investors depended on to judge the securities of the capital market. US government regulators also depended on the rating agencies; they allowed pension funds and money market funds to purchase only securities rated above certain levels.

A market for low-rated, high-yield "junk" bonds blossomed in the late 1970s, expanding securities financing to firms other than a few large, established blue chip corporations. Rating agencies also began to apply their ratings beyond bonds to counterparty risks, the performance risk of mortgage servicers, and the price volatility of mutual funds and mortgage-backed securities. Ratings were increasingly used in most developed countries' financial markets and in the "emerging markets" of the developing world. Moody's and S&P opened offices Europe, Japan, and particularly emerging markets. Non-American agencies also developed outside of the United States. Along with the largest US raters, one British, two Canadian and three Japanese firms were listed among the world's "most influential" rating agencies in the early 1990s by the Financial Times publication Credit Ratings International.

Structured finance was another growth area of growth. The "financial engineering" of the new "private-label" asset-backed securities—such as subprime mortgage-backed securities, collateralized debt obligations (CDO), "CDO-Squared", and "synthetic CDOs"—made them "harder to understand and to price" and became a profit center for rating agencies. By 2006, Moody's earned $881 million in revenue from structured finance. By December 2008, there were over $11 trillion structured finance debt securities outstanding in the US bond market.

The Big Three issued 97%–98% of all credit ratings in the United States and roughly 95% worldwide, giving them considerable pricing power. This and credit market expansion brought them profit margins of around 50% from 2004 through 2009.

As the influence and profitability of CRAs expanded, so did scrutiny and concern about their performance and alleged illegal practices. In 1996 the US Department of Justice launched an investigation into possible improper pressuring of issuers by Moody's in order to win business. Agencies were subjected to dozens of lawsuits by investors complaining of inaccurate ratings following the collapse of Enron, and especially after the US subprime mortgage crisis and the 2008 financial crisis. During that debacle, 73%—over $800 billion worth—of all mortgage-backed securities that one credit rating agency (Moody's) had rated triple-A in 2006 were downgraded to junk status two years later. In July 2008, SIFMA formed a global task force with members drawn from a cross-section of the financial services industry, including asset managers, underwriters, and issuers, and provided industry input to lawmakers and regulators in Europe and Asia, and was designated by the U.S. President's Working Group on Financial Markets as the private-sector group to provide the PWG with industry recommendations on credit rating matters. It published the "Recommendations of the Securities Industry and Financial Markets Association Credit Rating Agency Task Force", which included a dozen recommendations to change the credit rating agency process.

Downgrades of European and US sovereign debt were also criticized. In August 2011, S&P downgraded the long-held triple-A rating of US securities. Since the spring of 2010,

one or more of the Big Three relegated Greece, Portugal, and Ireland to "junk" status—a move that many EU officials say has accelerated the Euro area crisis. In January 2012, amid continued eurozone instability, S&P downgraded nine eurozone countries, stripping France and Austria of their triple-A ratings.

== Role in capital markets ==
Credit rating agencies assess the relative credit risk of specific debt securities or structured finance instruments and borrowing entities (issuers of debt), and in some cases the creditworthiness of governments and their securities. By serving as information intermediaries, CRAs theoretically reduce information costs, increase the pool of potential borrowers, and promote liquid markets. These functions may increase the supply of available risk capital in the market and promote economic growth.

=== Ratings use in bond market ===
Credit rating agencies provide assessments about the creditworthiness of bonds issued by corporations, governments, and packagers of asset-backed securities. In market practice, a significant bond issuance generally has a rating from one or two of the Big Three agencies.

CRAs theoretically provide investors with an independent evaluation and assessment of debt securities' creditworthiness. However, in recent decades the paying customers of CRAs have primarily not been buyers of securities but their issuers, raising the issue of conflict of interest (see below).

In addition, rating agencies have been liable—at least in US courts—for any losses incurred by the inaccuracy of their ratings only if it is proven that they knew the ratings were false or exhibited "reckless disregard for the truth". Otherwise, ratings are simply an expression of the agencies' informed opinions, protected as "free speech" under the First Amendment. As one rating agency disclaimer read:

The ratings ... are and must be construed solely as, statements of opinion and not statements of fact or recommendations to purchase, sell, or hold any securities.

Under an amendment to the 2010 Dodd-Frank Act, this protection has been removed, but how the law will be implemented remains to be determined by rules made by the SEC and decisions by courts.

To determine a bond's rating, a credit rating agency analyzes the accounts of the issuer and the legal agreements attached to the bond to produce what is effectively a forecast of the bond's chance of default, expected loss, or a similar metric. The metrics vary somewhat between the agencies. S&P's ratings reflect default probability, while ratings by Moody's reflect expected investor losses in the case of default. For corporate obligations, Fitch's ratings incorporate a measure of investor loss in the event of default, but its ratings on structured, project, and public finance obligations narrowly measure default risk. The process and criteria for rating a convertible bond are similar, although different enough that bonds and convertible bonds issued by the same entity may still receive different ratings. Some bank loans may receive ratings to assist in wider syndication and attract institutional investors.

The relative risks—the rating grades—are usually expressed through some variation of an alphabetical combination of lower- and uppercase letters, with either plus or minus signs or numbers added to further fine-tune the rating.

Fitch and S&P use (from the most creditworthy to the least) AAA, AA, A, and BBB for investment-grade long-term credit risk and BB, CCC, CC, C, and D for "speculative" long-term credit risk. Moody's long-term designators are Aaa, Aa, A, and Baa for investment grade and Ba, B, Caa, Ca, and C for speculative grade. Fitch and S&P use pluses and minuses (e.g., AA+ and AA−), and Moody's uses numbers (e.g., Aa1 and Aa3) to add further gradations.

Estimated spreads and default rates by rating grade
Rating	Basis point spread	Default rate
AAA/Aaa	43	0.18%
AA/Aa2	73	0.28%
A	99	n/a
BBB/Baa2	166	2.11%
BB/Ba2	299	8.82%
B/B2	404	31.24%
CCC	724	n/a
Sources: Basis spread is between US treasuries and rated bonds over a 16-year period; Default rate over a 5-year period, from a study by Moody's investment service

Agencies do not attach a hard number of probability of default to each grade, preferring descriptive definitions, such as "the obligor's capacity to meet its financial commitment on the obligation is extremely strong", (from a Standard and Poor's definition of a AAA-rated bond) or "less vulnerable to non-payment than other speculative issues" (for a BB-rated bond). However, some studies have estimated the average risk and reward of bonds by rating. One study by Moody's claimed that over a "5-year time horizon", bonds that were given its highest rating (Aaa) had a "cumulative default rate" of just 0.18%, the next highest (Aa2) 0.28%, the next (Baa2) 2.11%, 8.82% for the next (Ba2), and 31.24% for the lowest it studied (B2). (See "Default rate" in "Estimated spreads and default rates by rating grade" table to right.) Over a longer time horizon, it stated, "the order is by and large, but not exactly, preserved".

Another study in the Journal of Finance calculated the additional interest rate or "spread" that corporate bonds pay over that of "riskless" US Treasury bonds, according to the bonds rating. (See "Basis point spread" in the table to right.) Looking at rated bonds from 1973 through 1989, the authors found a AAA-rated bond paid only 43 "basis points" (or 43/100ths of a percentage point) more than a Treasury bond (so that it would yield 3.43% if the Treasury bond yielded 3.00%). A CCC-rated "junk" (or speculative) bond, on the other hand, paid over 4% more than a Treasury bond on average (7.04% if the Treasury bond yielded 3.00%) over that period.

The market also follows the benefits from ratings that result from government regulations (see below), which often prohibit financial institutions from purchasing securities rated below a certain level. For example, in the United States, in accordance with two 1989 regulations, pension funds are prohibited from investing in asset-backed securities rated below A, and savings and loan associations from investing in securities rated below BBB.

CRAs provide "surveillance" (ongoing review of securities after their initial rating) and may change a security's rating if they feel its creditworthiness has changed. CRAs typically signal in advance their intention to consider rating changes. Fitch, Moody's, and S&P all use negative "outlook" notifications to indicate the potential for a downgrade within the next two years (one year in the case of speculative-grade credits). Negative "watch" notifications are used to indicate that a downgrade is likely within the next 90 days.

=== Accuracy and responsiveness ===
Critics maintain that this rating, outlooking, and watching of securities has not worked nearly as smoothly as agencies suggest. They point to near-defaults, defaults, and financial disasters not detected by the rating agencies' post-issuance surveillance, or ratings of troubled debt securities not downgraded until just before (or even after) bankruptcy. These include the 1970 Penn Central bankruptcy, the 1975 New York City fiscal crisis, the 1994 Orange County default, the Asian and Russian financial crises, the 1998 collapse of the Long-Term Capital Management hedge fund, the 2001 Enron and WorldCom bankruptcies, and especially the 2007–8 subprime mortgage crisis.

In the 2001 Enron accounting scandal, the company's ratings remained at investment grade until four days before bankruptcy—though Enron's stock had been in sharp decline for several months—when "the outlines of its fraudulent practices" were first revealed. Critics complained that "not a single analyst at either Moody's or S&P lost his job as a result of missing the Enron fraud" and "management stayed the same". During the subprime crisis, when hundreds of billion of dollars' worth of triple-A-rated mortgage-backed securities were abruptly downgraded from triple-A to "junk" status within two years of issue, the CRAs' ratings were characterized by critics as "catastrophically misleading" and "provided little or no value". Ratings of preferred stocks also fared poorly. Despite over a year of rising mortgage delinquencies, Moody's continued to rate Freddie Mac's preferred stock triple-A until mid-2008, when it was downgraded to one tick above the junk bond level. Some empirical studies have also found that rather than a downgrade lowering the market price and raising the interest rates of corporate bonds, the cause and effect are reversed. Expanding yield spreads (i.e., declining value and quality) of corporate bonds precedes downgrades by agencies, suggesting it is the market that alerts the CRAs of trouble and not vice versa.

In February 2018, an investigation by the Australian Securities and Investments Commission found a serious lack of detail and rigour in many of the ratings issued by agencies. ASIC examined six agencies, including the Australian arms of Fitch, Moody's and S&P Global Ratings (the other agencies were Best Asia-Pacific, Australia Ratings and Equifax Australia). It said agencies had often paid lip service to compliance. In one case, an agency had issued an annual compliance report only a single page in length, with scant discussion of methodology. In another case, a chief executive officer of a company had signed off on a report as though a board member. Also, overseas staff of ratings agencies had assigned credit ratings despite lacking the necessary accreditation.

==== Explanations of flaws ====
Defenders of credit rating agencies complain of the market's lack of appreciation. Argues Robert Clow, "When a company or sovereign nation pays its debt on time, the market barely takes momentary notice ... but let a country or corporation unexpectedly miss a payment or threaten default, and bondholders, lawyers and even regulators are quick to rush the field to protest the credit analyst's lapse." Others say that bonds assigned a low credit rating by rating agencies have been shown to default more frequently than bonds that receive a high credit rating, suggesting that ratings still serve as a useful indicator of credit risk.

A number of explanations of the rating agencies' inaccurate ratings and forecasts have been offered, especially in the wake of the subprime crisis:

- The methodologies employed by agencies to rate and monitor securities may be inherently flawed. For instance, a 2008 report by the Financial Stability Forum singled out methodological shortcomings—especially inadequate historical data—as a contributing cause in the underestimating of the risk in structured finance products by the CRAs before the subprime mortgage crisis.
- The ratings process relies on subjective judgments. This means that governments, for example, that are being rated can often inform and influence credit rating analysts during the review process
- The rating agencies' interest in pleasing the issuers of securities, who are their paying customers and benefit from high ratings, creates a conflict with their interest in providing accurate ratings of securities for investors buying the securities. Issuers of securities benefit from higher ratings in that many of their customers—retail banks, pension funds, money market funds, insurance companies—are prohibited by law or otherwise restrained from buying securities below a certain rating.
- The rating agencies may have been significantly understaffed during the subprime boom and thus unable to properly assess every debt instrument.
- Agency analysts may be underpaid relative to similar positions at investment banks and Wall Street firms, resulting in a migration of credit rating analysts and the analysts' inside knowledge of rating procedures to higher-paying jobs at the banks and firms that issue the securities being rated, and thereby facilitating the manipulation of ratings by issuers.
- The functional use of ratings as regulatory mechanisms may inflate their reputation for accuracy.

==== Excessive power ====
Conversely, the complaint has been made that agencies have too much power over issuers and that downgrades can even force troubled companies into bankruptcy. The lowering of a credit score by a CRA can create a vicious cycle and a self-fulfilling prophecy: not only do interest rates on securities rise, but other contracts with financial institutions may also be affected adversely, causing an increase in financing costs and an ensuing decrease in creditworthiness. Large loans to companies often contain a clause that makes the loan due in full if the company's credit rating is lowered beyond a certain point (usually from investment grade to "speculative"). The purpose of these "ratings triggers" is to ensure that the loan-making bank is able to lay claim to a weak company's assets before the company declares bankruptcy and a receiver is appointed to divide up the claims against the company. The effect of such ratings triggers, however, can be devastating: under a worst-case scenario, once the company's debt is downgraded by a CRA, the company's loans become due in full; if the company is incapable of paying all of these loans in full at once, it is forced into bankruptcy (a so-called death spiral). These ratings triggers were instrumental in the collapse of Enron. Since that time, major agencies have put extra effort into detecting them and discouraging their use, and the US SEC requires that public companies in the United States disclose their existence.

==== Reform laws ====
The 2010 Dodd–Frank Wall Street Reform and Consumer Protection Act mandated improvements to the regulation of credit rating agencies and addressed several issues relating to the accuracy of credit ratings specifically. Under Dodd-Frank rules, agencies must publicly disclose how their ratings have performed over time and must provide additional information in their analyses so investors can make better decisions. An amendment to the act also specifies that ratings are not protected by the First Amendment as free speech but are "fundamentally commercial in character and should be subject to the same standards of liability and oversight as apply to auditors, securities analysts and investment bankers." Implementation of this amendment has proven difficult due to conflict between the SEC and the rating agencies. The Economist magazine credits the free speech defence at least in part for the fact that "41 legal actions targeting S&P have been dropped or dismissed" since the crisis.

In the European Union, there is no specific legislation governing contracts between issuers and credit rating agencies. General rules of contract law apply in full, although it is difficult to hold agencies liable for breach of contract. In 2012, an Australian federal court held Standard & Poor's liable for inaccurate ratings.

=== Ratings use in structured finance ===
Credit rating agencies play a key role in structured financial transactions such as asset-backed securities (ABS), residential mortgage-backed securities (RMBS), commercial mortgage-backed securities (CMBS), collateralized debt obligations (CDOs), "synthetic CDOs", or derivatives.

Credit ratings for structured finance instruments may be distinguished from ratings for other debt securities in several important ways.

- These securities are more complex and an accurate prognoses of repayment more difficult than with other debt ratings. This is because they are formed by pooling debt — usually consumer credit assets, such as mortgages, credit card or auto loans — and structured by "slicing" the pool into multiple "tranches", each with a different priority of payment. Tranches are often likened to buckets capturing cascading water, where the water of monthly or quarterly repayment flows down to the next bucket (tranche) only if the one above has been filled with its full share and is overflowing. The higher-up the bucket in the income stream, the lower its risk, the higher its credit rating, and lower its interest payment. This means the higher-level tranches have more credit worthiness than would a conventional unstructured, untranched bond with the same repayment income stream, and allows rating agencies to rate the tranches triple A or other high grades. Such securities are then eligible for purchase by pension funds and money market funds restricted to higher-rated debt, and for use by banks wanting to reduce costly capital requirements.
- CRAs are not only paid for giving ratings to structured securities, but may be paid for advice on how to structure tranches and sometimes the underlying assets that secure the debt to achieve ratings the issuer desires. This involves back and forth interaction and analysis between the sponsor of the trust that issues the security and the rating agency. During this process, the sponsor may submit proposed structures to the agency for analysis and feedback until the sponsor is satisfied with the ratings of the different tranches.
- Credit rating agencies employ varying methodologies to rate structured finance products, but generally focus on the type of pool of financial assets underlying the security and the proposed capital structure of the trust. This approach often involves a quantitative assessment in accordance with mathematical models, and may thus introduce a degree of model risk. However, bank models of risk assessment have proven less reliable than credit rating agency models, even in the base of large banks with sophisticated risk management procedures.

Aside from investors mentioned above—who are subject to ratings-based constraints in buying securities—some investors simply prefer that a structured finance product be rated by a credit rating agency. And not all structured finance products receive a credit rating agency rating. Ratings for complicated or risky CDOs are unusual and some issuers create structured products relying solely on internal analytics to assess credit risk.

==== Subprime mortgage boom and crisis ====
The Financial Crisis Inquiry Commission has described the Big Three rating agencies as "key players in the process" of mortgage securitization, providing reassurance of the soundness of the securities to money manager investors with "no history in the mortgage business".

Credit rating agencies began issuing ratings for mortgage-backed securities in the mid-1970s. In subsequent years, the ratings were applied to securities backed by other types of assets. During the first years of the twenty-first century, demand for highly rated fixed income securities was high. Growth was particularly strong and profitable in the structured finance industry during the 2001-2006 subprime mortgage boom, and business with finance industry accounted for almost all of the revenue growth at at least one of the CRAs (Moody's).

From 2000 to 2007, Moody's rated nearly 45,000 mortgage-related securities as triple-A. In contrast only six (private sector) companies in the United States were given that top rating.

Rating agencies were even more important in rating collateralized debt obligations (CDOs). These securities mortgage/asset backed security tranches lower in the "waterfall" of repayment that could not be rated triple-A, but for whom buyers had to be found or the rest of the pool of mortgages and other assets could not be securitized. Rating agencies solved the problem by rating 70% to 80% of the CDO tranches triple-A. Still another innovative structured product most of whose tranches were also given high ratings was the "synthetic CDO". Cheaper and easier to create than ordinary "cash" CDOs, they paid insurance premium-like payments from credit default swap "insurance", instead of interest and principal payments from house mortgages. If the insured or "referenced" CDOs defaulted, investors lost their investment, which was paid out much like an insurance claim.

==== Conflict of interest ====
However, when it was discovered that the mortgages had been sold to buyers who could not pay them, massive numbers of securities were downgraded, the securitization "seized up" and the Great Recession ensued.

Critics blamed this underestimation of the risk of the securities on the conflict between two interests the CRAs have—rating securities accurately, and serving their customers, the security issuers who need high ratings to sell to investors subject to ratings-based constraints, such as pension funds and life insurance companies. While this conflict had existed for years, the combination of CRA focus on market share and earnings growth, the importance of structured finance to CRA profits, and pressure from issuers who began to 'shop around' for the best ratings brought the conflict to a head between 2000 and 2007.

A small number of arrangers of structured finance products—primarily investment banks—drive a large amount of business to the ratings agencies, and thus have a much greater potential to exert undue influence on a rating agency than a single corporate debt issuer.

A 2013 Swiss Finance Institute study of structured debt ratings from S&P, Moody's, and Fitch found that agencies provide better ratings for the structured products of issuers that provide them with more overall bilateral rating business. This effect was found to be particularly pronounced in the run-up to the subprime mortgage crisis. Alternative accounts of the agencies' inaccurate ratings before the crisis downplay the conflict of interest factor and focus instead on the agencies' overconfidence in rating securities, which stemmed from faith in their methodologies and past successes with subprime securitizations.

As a result of the 2008 financial crisis, various legal requirements were introduced to increase the transparency of structured finance ratings. The European Union now requires credit rating agencies to use an additional symbol with ratings for structured finance instruments in order to distinguish them from other rating categories.

=== Ratings use in sovereign debt ===
Credit rating agencies also issue credit ratings for sovereign borrowers, including national governments, states, municipalities, and sovereign-supported international entities. Sovereign borrowers are the largest debt borrowers in many financial markets. Governments from both advanced economies and emerging markets borrow money by issuing government bonds and selling them to private investors, either overseas or domestically. Governments from emerging and developing markets may also choose to borrow from other government and international organizations, such as the World Bank and the International Monetary Fund.

Sovereign credit ratings represent an assessment by a rating agency of a sovereign's ability and willingness to repay its debt. The rating methodologies used to assess sovereign credit ratings are broadly similar to those used for corporate credit ratings, although the borrower's willingness to repay receives extra emphasis since national governments may be eligible for debt immunity under international law, thus complicating repayment obligations. In addition, credit assessments reflect not only the long-term perceived default risk, but also short- or immediate-term political and economic developments. Differences in sovereign ratings between agencies may reflect varying qualitative evaluations of the investment environment.

National governments may solicit credit ratings to generate investor interest and improve access to the international capital markets. Developing countries often depend on strong sovereign credit ratings to access funding in international bond markets. Once ratings for a sovereign have been initiated, the rating agency will continue to monitor for relevant developments and adjust its credit opinion accordingly.

A 2010 International Monetary Fund study concluded that ratings were a reasonably good indicator of sovereign default risk. However, credit rating agencies were criticized for failing to predict the 1997 Asian financial crisis and for downgrading countries in the midst of that turmoil. Similar criticisms emerged after recent credit downgrades to Greece, Ireland, Portugal, and Spain, although credit ratings agencies had begun to downgrade peripheral Eurozone countries well before the Eurozone crisis began.

==== Conflict of interest in assigning sovereign ratings ====
As part of the Sarbanes–Oxley Act of 2002, Congress ordered the U.S. SEC to develop a report, titled "Report on the Role and Function of Credit Rating Agencies in the Operation of the Securities Markets" detailing how credit ratings are used in U.S. regulation and the policy issues this use raises. Partly as a result of this report, in June 2003, the SEC published a "concept release" called "Rating Agencies and the Use of Credit Ratings under the Federal Securities Laws" that sought public comment on many of the issues raised in its report. Public comments on this concept release have also been published on the SEC's website.

In December 2004, the International Organization of Securities Commissions (IOSCO) published a Code of Conduct for CRAs that, among other things, is designed to address the types of conflicts of interest that CRAs face. All of the major CRAs have agreed to sign on to this Code of Conduct and it has been praised by regulators ranging from the European Commission to the US SEC.

=== Use by government regulators ===
Regulatory authorities and legislative bodies in the United States and other jurisdictions rely on credit rating agencies' assessments of a broad range of debt issuers, and thereby attach a regulatory function to their ratings. This regulatory role is a derivative function in that the agencies do not publish ratings for that purpose. Governing bodies at both the national and international level have woven credit ratings into minimum capital requirements for banks, allowable investment alternatives for many institutional investors, and similar restrictive regulations for insurance companies and other financial market participants.

The use of credit ratings by regulatory agencies is not a new phenomenon. In the 1930s, regulators in the United States used credit rating agency ratings to prohibit banks from investing in bonds that were deemed to be below investment grade. In the following decades, state regulators outlined a similar role for agency ratings in restricting insurance company investments. From 1975 to 2006, the U.S. Securities and Exchange Commission (SEC) recognized the largest and most credible agencies as Nationally Recognized Statistical Rating Organizations, and relied on such agencies exclusively for distinguishing between grades of creditworthiness in various regulations under federal securities laws. The Credit Rating Agency Reform Act of 2006 created a voluntary registration system for CRAs that met a certain minimum criteria, and provided the SEC with broader oversight authority.

The practice of using credit rating agency ratings for regulatory purposes has since expanded globally. Today, financial market regulations in many countries contain extensive references to ratings. The Basel III accord, a global bank capital standardization effort, relies on credit ratings to calculate minimum capital standards and minimum liquidity ratios.

The extensive use of credit ratings for regulatory purposes can have a number of unintended effects. Because regulated market participants must follow minimum investment grade provisions, ratings changes across the investment/non-investment grade boundary may lead to strong market price fluctuations and potentially cause systemic reactions. The regulatory function granted to credit rating agencies may also adversely affect their original market information function of providing credit opinions.

Against this background and in the wake of criticism of credit rating agencies following the subprime mortgage crisis, legislators in the United States and other jurisdictions have commenced to reduce rating reliance in laws and regulations. The 2010 Dodd–Frank Act removes statutory references to credit rating agencies, and calls for federal regulators to review and modify existing regulations to avoid relying on credit ratings as the sole assessment of creditworthiness.

== Industry structure ==
=== The Big Three agencies ===
Credit rating is a highly concentrated industry, with the "Big Three" credit rating agencies controlling approximately 94% of the ratings business. Standard & Poor's (S&P) controls 50.0% of the global market with Moody's Investors Service controlling 31.7%, and Fitch Ratings controlling a further 12.5%.

As of December 2023, S&P is the largest of the three, with 1.06 million outstanding ratings and 1,636 analysts and supervisors; Moody's has 671,000 outstanding ratings and 1,644 analysts and supervisors; and Fitch is the smallest, with approximately 263,000 outstanding ratings and 1,133 analysts and supervisors. Fitch is sometimes used as an alternative to S&P and Moody's.

The three largest agencies are not the only sources of credit information. Many smaller rating agencies also exist, mostly serving non-US markets. All of the large securities firms have internal fixed income analysts who offer information about the risk and volatility of securities to their clients. And specialized risk consultants working in a variety of fields offer credit models and default estimates.

Market share concentration is not a new development in the credit rating industry. Since the establishment of the first agency in 1909, there have never been more than four credit rating agencies with significant market share. Even the 2008 financial crisis—where the performance of the three rating agencies was dubbed "horrendous" by The Economist magazine—led to a drop in the share of the three by just one percent—from 98 to 97%.

The reason for the concentrated market structure is disputed. One widely cited opinion is that the Big Three's historical reputation within the financial industry creates a high barrier of entry for new entrants. Following the enactment of the Credit Rating Agency Reform Act of 2006 in the US, seven additional rating agencies attained recognition from the SEC as nationally recognized statistical rating organization (NRSROs). While these other agencies remain niche players, some have gained market share following the 2008 financial crisis, and in October 2012 several announced plans to join together and create a new organization called the Universal Credit Rating Group. The European Union has considered setting up a state-supported EU-based agency. In November 2013, credit ratings organizations from five countries (CPR of Portugal, CARE Rating of India, GCR of South Africa, MARC of Malaysia, and SR Rating of Brazil) joint ventured to launch ARC Ratings, a new global agency touted as an alternative to the "Big Three".

=== Other credit rating agencies ===
In addition to "the Big Three" of Moody's, Standard & Poor's, and Fitch Ratings, other agencies and rating companies include:

Infomerics Credit Rating Nepal Limited (Nepal), Acuité Ratings & Research Limited (India), A. M. Best (U.S.), Agusto & Co. (Nigeria), ARC Ratings (UK) & (EU), DataPro Limited (Nigeria), Capital Intelligence Ratings Limited (CIR) (Cyprus), CareEdge Ratings (India), China Lianhe Credit Rating Co., Ltd. (China), CSCI Pengyuan Credit Ratings Co., Ltd (China), China Chengxin Credit Rating Group (China), Credit Rating Agency Ltd (Zambia), Credit Rating Information and Services Limited (Bangladesh), CSPI Ratings (Hong Kong), CTRISKS (Hong Kong), DBRS (Canada), Dun & Bradstreet (U.S.), Egan-Jones Rating Company (U.S.), Global Credit Ratings Co. (South Africa), HR Ratings de México, S.A. de C.V. (Mexico), The Pakistan Credit Rating Agency Limited (PACRA) (Pakistan), ICRA Limited (India), Japan Credit Rating Agency (Japan), JCR VIS Credit Rating Company Ltd (Pakistan), Kroll Bond Rating Agency (U.S.), Levin and Goldstein (Zambia), Lianhe Ratings Global (Hong Kong), modeFinance (Italy), Morningstar, Inc. (U.S.), Muros Ratings (Russia, alternative rating company), Public Sector Credit Solutions (U.S., not-for profit rating provider), Rapid Ratings International (U.S.), SMERA Gradings & Ratings Private Limited (India), Universal Credit Rating Group (Hong Kong), Veda (Australia, previously known as Baycorp Advantage), Wikirating (Switzerland, alternative rating organization), Feller Rate Clasificadora de Riesgo (Chile), Humphreys Ltd (Chile, previously known as Moody's partner in Chile), National University of Singapore's Credit Research Initiative (Singapore, non-profit rating provider), Spread Research (independent credit research and rating agency, France), INC Rating (Poland), Scope Ratings GmbH (Germany).

=== Business models ===
Credit rating agencies generate revenue from a variety of activities related to the production and distribution of credit ratings. The sources of the revenue are generally the issuer of the securities or the investor. Most agencies operate under one or a combination of business models: the subscription model and the issuer-pays model. However, agencies may offer additional services using a combination of business models.

Under the subscription model, the credit rating agency does not make its ratings freely available to the market, so investors pay a subscription fee for access to ratings. This revenue provides the main source of agency income, although agencies may also provide other types of services. Under the issuer-pays model, agencies charge issuers a fee for providing credit rating assessments. This revenue stream allows issuer-pays credit rating agencies to make their ratings freely available to the broader market, especially via the Internet.

The subscription approach was the prevailing business model until the early 1970s, when Moody's, Fitch, and finally Standard & Poor's adopted the issuer-pays model. Several factors contributed to this transition, including increased investor demand for credit ratings, and widespread use of information sharing technology—such as fax machines and photocopiers—which allowed investors to freely share agencies' reports and undermined demand for subscriptions. Today, eight of the nine nationally recognized statistical rating organizations (NRSRO) use the issuer-pays model, only Egan-Jones maintains an investor subscription service. Smaller, regional credit rating agencies may use either model. For example, China's oldest rating agency, Chengxin Credit Management Co., uses the issuer-pays model. The Universal Credit Ratings Group, formed by Beijing-based Dagong Global Credit Rating, Egan-Jones of the U.S. and Russia's RusRatings, uses the investor-pays model, while Dagong Europe Credit Rating, the other joint-venture of Dagong Global Credit Rating, uses the issuer-pays model.

Critics argue that the issuer-pays model creates a potential conflict of interest because the agencies are paid by the organizations whose debt they rate. However, the subscription model is also seen to have disadvantages, as it restricts the ratings' availability to paying investors. Issuer-pays CRAs have argued that subscription-models can also be subject to conflicts of interest due to pressures from investors with strong preferences on product ratings. In 2010 Lace Financials, a subscriber-pays agency later acquired by Kroll Ratings, was fined by the SEC for violating securities rules to the benefit of its largest subscriber.

A 2009 World Bank report proposed a "hybrid" approach in which issuers who pay for ratings are required to seek additional scores from subscriber-based third parties. Other proposed alternatives include a "public-sector" model in which national governments fund the rating costs, and an "exchange-pays" model, in which stock and bond exchanges pay for the ratings. Crowd-sourced, collaborative models such as Wikirating have been suggested as an alternative to both the subscription and issuer-pays models, although it is a recent development as of the 2010, and not yet widely used.

==== Oligopoly produced by regulation ====
Agencies are sometimes accused of being oligopolists, because barriers to market entry are high and rating agency business is itself reputation-based (and the finance industry pays little attention to a rating that is not widely recognized). In 2003, the US SEC submitted a report to Congress detailing plans to launch an investigation into the anti-competitive practices of credit rating agencies and issues including conflicts of interest.

Think tanks such as the World Pensions Council (WPC) have argued that the Basel II/III "capital adequacy" norms favored at first essentially by the central banks of France, Germany and Switzerland (while the US and the UK were rather lukewarm) have unduly encouraged the use of ready-made opinions produced by oligopolistic rating agencies

Of the large agencies, only Moody's is a separate, publicly held corporation that discloses its financial results without dilution by non-ratings businesses, and its high profit margins (which at times have been greater than 50 percent of gross margin) can be construed as consistent with the type of returns one might expect in an industry which has high barriers to entry. Celebrated investor Warren Buffett described the company as "a natural duopoly", with "incredible" pricing power, when asked by the Financial Crisis Inquiry Commission about his ownership of 15% of the company.

According to professor Frank Partnoy, the regulation of CRAs by the SEC and Federal Reserve Bank has eliminated competition between CRAs and practically forced market participants to use the services of the three big agencies, Standard and Poor's, Moody's and Fitch.

SEC Commissioner Kathleen Casey has said that these CRAs have acted much like Fannie Mae, Freddie Mac and other companies that dominate the market because of government actions. When the CRAs gave ratings that were "catastrophically misleading, the large rating agencies enjoyed their most profitable years ever during the past decade."

To solve this problem, Ms. Casey (and others such as NYU professor Lawrence White) have proposed removing the NRSRO rules completely. Professor Frank Partnoy suggests that the regulators use the results of the credit risk swap markets rather than the ratings of NRSROs.

The CRAs have made competing suggestions that would, instead, add further regulations that would make market entrance even more expensive than it is now.

== See also ==
- Credit rating
- List of countries by credit rating
- Nationally recognized statistical rating organization
- Securities Industry and Financial Markets Association
