= Secondary Mortgage Market Enhancement Act =

1984 United States law

Secondary Mortgage Market Enhancement Act of 1984
- Long title: An Act To amend the Securities Exchange Act of 1934 with respect to the treatment of mortgage backed securities, to increase the authority of the Federal National Mortgage Association and the Federal Home Loan Mortgage Corporation, and for other purposes.
- Acronyms (colloquial): SMMEA
- Enacted by: the 98th United States Congress

Citations
- Public law: Pub. L. 98–440
- Statutes at Large: 98 Stat. 1689

Legislative history
- Introduced in the Senate by Jake Garn (R-UT) on November 2, 1983; Committee consideration by Senate Banking, Housing, and Urban Affairs, House Banking, Finance, and Urban Affairs, House Energy and Commerce; Passed the Senate on February 9, 1984 (voice vote); Passed the House on September 11, 1984 (voice vote); Signed into law by President Ronald Reagan on October 3, 1984

The Secondary Mortgage Market Enhancement Act of 1984 (SMMEA) was an Act of Congress intended to improve the marketability of private label mortgage-backed security passthroughs. It is mentioned as a significant contributing factor in the subprime mortgage crisis.

It declared nationally recognized statistical rating organization (NRSRO) AA-rated mortgage-backed securities to be legal investments equivalent to Treasury securities and other federal government bonds for federally chartered banks (such as federal savings banks, federal savings associations, etc.), state-chartered financial institutions (such as depository banks and insurance companies) unless overridden by state law before October 1991 (of which 21 states did so), and Department of Labor-regulated pension funds.
