= RapidRatings =

Financial services company

- Type: Private company
- Industry: Credit ratings
- Founded: 2007; 19 years ago
- Headquarters: New York City, United States
- Area served: Global
- Key people: Elliot Goldman (CEO); James H. Gellert (Chair)
- Services: Financial health analysis, Supply chain risk assessments, ESG assessments, Peer benchmarking
- Website: www.rapidratings.com

Rapid Ratings International is an American SaaS technology firm that provides information on the financial health of public and private companies around the world. The company's analytics system allegedly provides insights into third-party partners, suppliers, vendors, and customers. The company's platform provides Financial Health Ratings and detailed reporting to help businesses mitigate financial risk. Additionally, Rapid Ratings offers a service to obtain financial statements from private company third parties to increase transparency and improve visibility.

Rapid Ratings is headquartered in New York City at 86 Chambers Street near City Hall. It also has a North American office in Boston for customer service. International offices include Dublin, Ireland - the company's technology hub - and the New Zealand office, which focuses on R&D.

In 2020, the firm predicted that more than half of the companies currently operating on the globe would become high risk due to a decrease in revenues brought on by the COVID-19 pandemic.

== History ==
The framework for Rapid Ratings' technology was founded in 1991 by economist Dr. Patrick Caragata. He was repeatedly struck by the problems of the rating industry status quo throughout his work as a senior-level economist in Canada and New Zealand. Dr. Caragata analyzed millions of company years’ worth of data to assess the financial health and performance of companies to develop the initial framework for the Financial Health Rating model.

In 2007, James H. Gellert and Douglas M. Cameron, bankers and entrepreneurs in the financial and business information services markets, brought RapidRatings to the United States.

The company gained recognition after the 2008 financial crisis, as traditional rating agencies were criticized for conflicts of interest inherent in their issuer-paid models and qualitative ratings. It gained attention for detecting inefficiencies at MF Global, Enron, WorldCom, Parmalat, General Motors, Bear Stearns, Ford Motor Company, U.S. Steel, and Peregrine. All of these companies had ratings well below investment grade for years before traditional agencies downgraded them.

In April 2016, RapidRatings secured its Series A round of funding from private equity firm LLR Partners to invest in growth and focus on innovation. LLR invests in middle-market growth companies in a broad range of industries, with an emphasis on software, technology-enabled services, and healthcare. RapidRatings invested in many areas including leadership, sales, marketing, customer service, and product.

In September 2018, RapidRatings secured $30 million in its Series B round of funding from private equity firm FTV Capital to continue investing in growth. FTV Capital is a growth equity firm specializing in innovative enterprise technology and services companies. Kyle Griswold, FTV Capital partner, also joined the RapidRatings board of directors.

== Methodology ==
RapidRatings generates a Financial Health Rating (FHR), a single number on a 0 - 100 scale that indicates the overall financial health of a given company. The FHR is calculated using fundamental data from a company's financial statements and does not take into account market inputs, analysts' opinions, trade payments, or contact with issuers, bankers, or advisors. The system uses over 70 efficiency ratios and places companies into 24 industry groupings, allowing it to measure industry-specific risk.

By using financial data, the rating provides a 12-month, forward-looking assessment of a company's financial stability. The company can rate publicly traded and privately owned firms on the same basis, which is accomplished through individual and confidential outreach to the private companies on behalf of a client.

Over the past 20 years, approximately 90% of defaults have been rated into the company's High Risk and Very High-Risk categories. One academic study published in 2011 by two finance professors at Indiana University and American University found RapidRatings to lead other competitors by more than two years in downgrading companies that ultimately failed.

RapidRatings’ clients fall into several departments across all industries including financial investment and risk management, supply chain risk management, financial services vendor management, third-party risk management, and corporate credit risk management.

== Congressional involvement ==
During his tenure as the firm's CEO and chairman, James H. Gellert spoke extensively about increasing competition in the rating industry. Gellert testified to Congress and the SEC six times to discuss RapidRatings’ FHRs and promote rating industry reform.

=== MF Global collapse ===
On February 1, 2012, RapidRatings testified alongside S&P and Moody's about the collapse of MF Global. While S&P and Moody issued MF Global investment-grade ratings until days before it filed for bankruptcy, RapidRatings had rated MF Global as high risk for more than two years leading up to the filing. At the time of the filing, it had an FHR of 23.

=== NRSRO status ===
RapidRatings has chosen not to apply to become a Nationally Recognized Statistical Rating Agency (NRSRO) for reasons that include increased liability exposure, increased operating costs, and complex internal process requirements. Doing so would also threaten its intellectual property by requiring it to disclose the software behind its proprietary system, which allows it to function without bias.
