= Kroll Bond Rating Agency =

American credit rating agency

- KBRA headquarters at 805 3rd Avenue
- Type: Private
- Industry: Financial services
- Founded: 2010; 16 years ago
- Founder: Jules Kroll
- Headquarters: 805 Third Avenue; New York City, New York, U.S.
- Number of employees: 700
- Website: www.kbra.com

Kroll Bond Rating Agency (informally known as KBRA) is an American credit rating agency (CRA) that publishes credit ratings on debt issued by companies, governments and structured finance vehicles. It is one of ten credit rating agencies designated by the U.S. Securities and Exchange Commission (SEC) as a nationally recognized statistical rating organization.

== History ==
In 2010, Jules Kroll founded KBRA with his son, Jeremy Kroll. The agency was begun with capital from Jeff Keswin, Michael F. Price, Frederick R. Adler, William L. Mack, and James Robinson III; Bessemer Venture Partners, RRE Ventures, and New Markets Venture Partners also invested $24 million.

In December 2021, Sherman Financial Group sold off its ownership percentage of Kroll Bond Rating Agency, a credit rating agency, for $900 million.

In May 2026, Maryland ended its working relationship with Moody's after the ratings agency downgraded the state from AAA to Aa1. The state replaced it with KBRA, which had given the state a AAA rating in January 2026. The Treasurer of Maryland, Dereck Davis, defended this decision, stating that hiring KBRA would cost the state roughly one-third of what it had paid Moody's.

== Credit ratings ==
As a credit rating agency (CRA), the company issues credit ratings for the debt of public and private companies, and public borrowers such as governments, governmental agencies, and cities. It is one of several CRAs that have been designated a nationally recognized statistical rating organization (NRSRO) by the U.S. Securities and Exchange Commission.

=== Long-term credit ratings ===
KBRA rates borrowers on a scale from AAA to D. Intermediate ratings can be given at each category between AA and CCC (such as BBB+, BBB, and BBB−) to indicate variations in risk within each category.

Investment Grade

- AAA: An obligor rated 'AAA' has extremely strong capacity to meet its financial commitments. 'AAA' is the highest issuer credit rating assigned by KBRA.
- AA: An obligor rated 'AA' has very strong capacity to meet its financial commitments. It differs from the highest-rated obligors only to a small degree.
- A: An obligor rated 'A' has strong capacity to meet its financial commitments but is somewhat more susceptible to the adverse effects of changes in circumstances and economic conditions than obligors in higher-rated categories.
- BBB: An obligor rated 'BBB' has adequate capacity to meet its financial commitments. However, adverse economic conditions or changing circumstances are more likely to lead to a weakened capacity of the obligor to meet its financial commitments.

Non-Investment Grade (also known as speculative-grade)

- BB: An obligor rated 'BB' is less vulnerable in the near term than other lower-rated obligors. However, it faces major ongoing uncertainties and exposure to adverse business, financial, or economic conditions, which could lead to the obligor's inadequate capacity to meet its financial commitments.
- B: An obligor rated 'B' is more vulnerable than the obligors rated 'BB', but the obligor currently has the capacity to meet its financial commitments. Adverse business, financial, or economic conditions will likely impair the obligor's capacity or willingness to meet its financial commitments.
- CCC: An obligor rated 'CCC' is currently vulnerable, and is dependent upon favorable business, financial, and economic conditions to meet its financial commitments.
- CC: An obligor rated 'CC' is currently highly vulnerable.
- C: highly vulnerable, perhaps in bankruptcy or in arrears but still continuing to pay out on obligations
- D: has defaulted on obligations and KBRA believes that it will generally default on most or all obligations

=== Short-term issue credit ratings ===
The company rates specific issues on a scale from K1+ to D. Within the A-1 category, it can be designated with a plus sign (+). This indicates that the issuer's commitment to meet its obligation is very strong.

- K1+: obligor's capacity to meet its financial commitment on the obligation is exceptionally strong
- K1: obligor has a very strong ability to meet its financial commitment
- K2: is more susceptible to adverse economic conditions, however, the obligor's capacity to meet its financial commitment on the obligation is strong
- K3: adequate ability to meet its financial commitment on the obligation
- B: questionable ability to meet its financial commitment on the obligation
- C: little ability to meet its financial commitment on the obligation
- D: is in payment default. Obligation not made on due date and grace period may not have expired.

== Criticisms ==
In 2023, the SEC charged KBRA with "longstanding failures to preserve electronic records, including off-channel communications on personal and work-issued devices." KBRA agreed to pay $4 million in civil penalties.

== See also ==
- Global Industry Classification Standard
- Nationally recognized statistical rating organization
- Moody's Ratings
- Fitch Ratings
- Standard & Poor's
