= Moody's Aaa Bond =

Corporate investment bond

Moody's Aaa Corporate Bond, also known as "Moody's Aaa" for short, is an investment bond that acts as an index of the performance of all bonds given an Aaa rating by Moody's Investors Service. This corporate bond is often used in macroeconomics as an alternative to the federal ten-year Treasury Bill as an indicator of the interest rate. Moody's and other investment companies have other less common investment bonds that are also used.

Moody's Seasoned Aaa Corporate Bond Yield are available at the St. Louis Federal Reserve Economic Data (FRED) database.

== See also ==
- Bond Valuation — Yield To Maturity
- Dividend yield
- Bond duration
- Coupon rate
- Moody's Analytics
