= CareEdge Group =

Indian financial services company

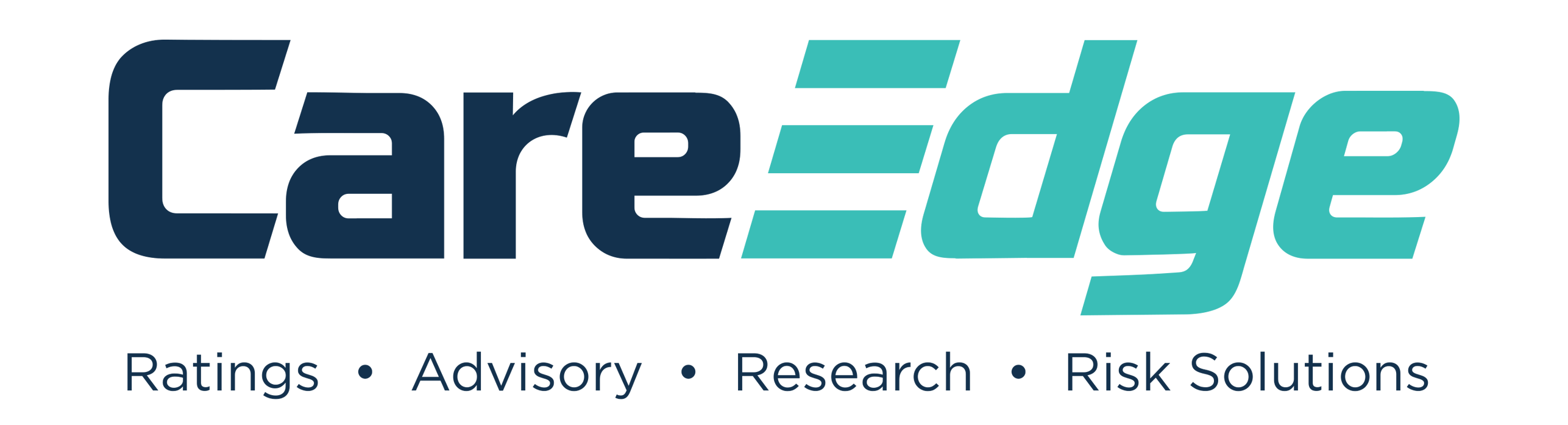
- Formerly: CARE Ratings
- Type: Public company
- Traded as: BSE: 534804; NSE: CARERATING
- Industry: Financial services
- Founded: 1993; 33 years ago
- Headquarters: Mumbai, India
- Key people: Mehul Pandya (MD & Group CEO). Sachin Gupta (ED); Revati Kasture (ED)
- Services: Credit Ratings, Analytics, Consulting, Research, ESG
- Revenue: ▲₹251 crore (US$27 million) (December 2023)
- Website: www.careratings.com

CareEdge Group (formerly "Care Ratings") is an Indian credit rating agency headquartered in Mumbai, Maharashtra. In addition to credit ratings for manufacturing, infrastructure, financial services, and structured finance, the group provides research, analytics, risk management, and advisory services.

== History ==
CareEdge Group was established in 1993 as Credit Analysis and Research Limited.

CareEdge was publicly listed on the Bombay Stock Exchange (BSE) and the National Stock Exchange of India (NSE) on December 26, 2012, following its initial public offering (IPO).

The company established international subsidiaries in Mauritius in 2015, Nepal in 2017, and South Africa in 2023, to offer ratings and advisory services in those regions.

== Sovereign Ratings ==
In 2024, CareEdge published its sovereign rating methodology to assess the creditworthiness of sovereign debt issuers globally. In 2024 the African Peer Review Mechanism and Care Ratings (Africa) signed a Memorandum of Understanding to collaborate in developing credit rating standards for Africa.

In 2023, V. Anantha Nageswaran, Chief Economic Advisor to the Government of India, published a paper suggesting reforms to the methodologies used by global credit rating agencies, indicating potential bias against developing countries. In the paper, Nageswaran, along with his co-author, Rajiv Mishra stated that, the global ratings agencies risked "sowing suspicion about discriminatory intent". The paper went on to say that "developing countries have seen over 95% of all downgrades despite experiencing milder economic contractions than their advanced economy counterparts."

== Company structure ==
CARE Ratings Limited is the parent company of the CareEdge Group. It commenced operations in April 1993 and became publicly listed on 26 December 2012 on both the Bombay Stock Exchange (BSE) and the National Stock Exchange of India (NSE).

As of June 2024, CARE Ratings Limited operates several wholly owned subsidiaries focused on analytics, ESG assessments, and international credit rating services.

- CARE Analytics & Advisory Private Ltd, formerly known as CARE Risk Solutions Pvt Ltd, which provides analytics and advisory services.
- CARE ESG Ratings Ltd, previously known as CARE Advisory Research and Training Ltd, focused on ESG assessments.
- CareEdge Global IFSC Ltd, based in the International Financial Services Centre in GIFT City, offering global financial services.
- International subsidiaries include:
- CARE Ratings (Africa) Private Limited, licensed by the Financial Services Commission (Mauritius) in May 2015 and recognized as an External Credit Assessment Institution (ECAI) by the Bank of Mauritius in May 2016.
- CARE Ratings South Africa (Pty) Ltd, operating in South Africa.
- CARE Ratings Nepal Limited, incorporated in Kathmandu and licensed by the Securities Board of Nepal (SEBON) on 16 November 2017 as the second credit rating agency in Nepal.

== Involvement in the Infrastructure Leasing & Financial Services Crisis ==
CareEdge Group, along with other credit rating agencies such as ICRA Limited, assigned credit ratings to Infrastructure Leasing & Financial Services (IL&FS) and its subsidiaries. During the period of IL&FS's financial difficulties, CareEdge and other agencies maintained high ratings for IL&FS entities, with downgrades occurring after defaults began.

An audit conducted by Grant Thornton found that IL&FS management provided incomplete or inaccurate information, which affected the rating processes of CareEdge and other agencies. This contributed to challenges in reflecting IL&FS's financial condition in the ratings on time.

The Securities and Exchange Board of India (SEBI) reviewed the rating processes and imposed penalties on CareEdge and ICRA for procedural lapses identified in connection with the IL&FS matter. The issuer-pays model, used by CareEdge and other rating agencies, has been noted by analysts as a potential source of conflicts of interest in the credit rating industry.

An independent inquiry into the leadership of Rajesh Mokashi, who served as CEO of CareEdge during the IL&FS events, found no evidence of wrongdoing on his part. Following these events, CareEdge appointed Ajay Mahanjan as CEO, and in 2022, Mehul Pandya was promoted internally to lead the group.
