= Nationally recognized statistical rating organization =

US SEC approved credit rating agencies

A nationally recognized statistical rating organization (NRSRO) is a credit rating agency (CRA) approved by the U.S. Securities and Exchange Commission (SEC) to provide information that financial firms must rely on for certain regulatory purposes.

== History ==
The use of the term NRSRO began in 1975 when the SEC promulgated rules regarding bank and broker-dealer net capital requirements (17 CFR 240.15c3-1).

Prior to 1975, the SEC did not adopt specific standards for determining which credit rating agencies were "nationally recognized", and instead addressed the question on a case-by-case basis. NRSRO recognition was granted by the SEC through a "No Action Letter" sent by the SEC staff. Under this approach, if a CRA (or investment bank or broker-dealer) were interested in using the ratings from a particular CRA for regulatory purposes, the SEC staff would research the market to determine whether ratings from that particular CRA were widely used and considered "reliable and credible." If the SEC staff determined that this was the case, it would send a letter to the CRA indicating that if a regulated entity were to rely on the CRA's ratings, the SEC staff would not recommend enforcement action against that entity. These "No Action Letters" were made public and could be relied upon by other regulated entities, not just the entity making the original request. The SEC later sought to further define the criteria it uses when making this assessment, and in March 2005 published a proposed regulation to this effect. According to the SEC:

The single most important factor in the Commission staff's assessment of NRSRO status is whether the rating agency is "nationally recognized" in the United States as an issuer of credible and reliable ratings by the predominant users of securities ratings. The staff also reviews the operational capability and reliability of each rating organization. Included within this assessment are: (1) the organizational structure of the rating organization; (2) the rating organization's financial resources (to determine, among other things, whether it is able to operate independently of economic pressures or control from the companies it rates); (3) the size and quality of the rating organization's staff (to determine if the entity is capable of thoroughly and competently evaluating an issuer's credit); (4) the rating organization's independence from the companies it rates; (5) the rating organization's rating procedures (to determine whether it has systematic procedures designed to produce credible and accurate ratings); and (6) whether the rating organization has internal procedures to prevent the misuse of nonpublic information and whether those procedures are followed. The staff also recommends that the agency become registered as an investment adviser.

In 2006, following criticism that the SEC's "No Action letter" approach was simultaneously too opaque and provided the SEC with too little regulatory oversight of NRSROs, the U.S. Congress passed the Credit Rating Agency Reform Act of 2006, Pub. L. 109–291 (text) (PDF), 120 Stat. 1327, enacted September 29, 2006. This law required the SEC to establish clear guidelines for determining which credit rating agencies qualify as NRSROs. It also gives the SEC the power to regulate NRSRO internal processes regarding record-keeping and how they guard against conflicts of interest, and makes the NRSRO determination subject to a Commission vote (rather than an SEC staff determination). Notably, however, the law specifically prohibits the SEC from regulating an NRSRO's rating methodologies. In June 2007, the SEC promulgated new regulations that implemented the provisions of the Credit Rating Agency Reform Act. In February 2009, the SEC promulgated amended regulations designed to address concerns about the integrity of the process by which NRSROs rate structured finance products, particularly mortgage-related securities.

Since 2010, there have also been changes in laws and regulations due to the Dodd–Frank Wall Street Reform and Consumer Protection Act, including the January 2011 Final Rule: Disclosure for Asset-Backed Securities Required by Section 943 of the Dodd-Frank Wall Street Reform and Consumer Protection Act.

== Controversies ==
Many private users (pension funds, banks) of ratings data now demand that ratings be from an NRSRO. Consequently, there is some debate that, by "recognizing" certain CRAs, the SEC bestows a competitive advantage on them. This view is supported by the vigor by which many non-NRSRO CRAs seek NRSRO recognition. On the other hand, many private users of ratings data prefer Standard & Poor's and Moody's. (S&P and Moody's are the oldest, most widely respected, and by far the largest of the CRAs.) Accordingly, it is conceivable that the NRSRO designation has actually increased competition in the industry by providing an unintended government "seal of approval" on certain smaller CRAs (such as DBRS, Kroll Bond Rating Agency, HR Ratings de México, S.A. de C.V., and Egan-Jones). If true, this of course raises the question of whether this is something the government should do, and whether the NRSRO recognition process is the best mechanism to achieve this goal.

The larger NRSROs have also been criticized for their reliance on an "issuer-pays" business model, whereby the bulk of their revenue comes from the issuers of the bonds being rated, so that the company receiving the credit rating pays the CRA directly. While this is recognized by regulators as a potential conflict of interest (since the bond issuer paying for the rating has an incentive to seek out the CRA most likely to give it a high rating, possibly creating a "race-to-the-bottom" in terms of rating quality), the larger NRSROs claim that the issuer-pays model is the only feasible model for them, because, in an age of email and faxes, the ratings of the larger CRAs are so widely and so quickly shared that a subscription-based model would not be profitable. Conversely, the predominance of the issuer-pays model has led to concerns that a CRA will be tempted to artificially inflate its rating to retain a valued customer. This threat has been taken seriously by U.S. regulators who have adopted amendments to existing regulations designed to separate the payment negotiation and the credit assessment branches within a firm.

The larger CRAs often receive non-public information from issuers and, under the SEC's Regulation FD, a CRA may only use such information if its ratings are made available to the public for free.

Some smaller CRAs, including Egan-Jones (the only NRSRO to do so), use a subscription-based business model whereby ratings are not made public but are available only to subscribers, who pay a monthly fee for access to credit rating information. These smaller CRAs argue that such a business model makes them less reliant on the good will of the issuers they rate, thereby eliminating one major potential conflict of interest.

== Subprime mortgages, collateralized debt obligations, and the financial crisis ==
The ratings agencies were heavily involved in the markets that enabled the subprime credit bubble of 2000-2008 and the subsequent financial crisis. In 1984 the federal government of the United States passed the Secondary Mortgage Market Enhancement Act (SMMEA) to improve the marketability of private-label (non-agency) mortgage-backed securities, which declared NRSRO AA-rated mortgage-backed securities to be legal investments equivalent to Treasury securities and other federal government bonds for federally-charted banks (such as federal savings banks, federal savings associations, etc.), state-chartered financial institutions (such as depository banks and insurance companies) unless overridden by state law by October 1991 (of which 21 states did so), and Department of Labor-regulated pension funds.

By 2000, the NRSROs were making substantial profits from rating collateralized debt obligations (CDOs), residential mortgage-backed securities, and other varieties of structured finance connected to the subprime lending industry. The ratings on these products were essential to the way the banks marketed the products. Buyers, like pension funds, university endowments, and local governments (Narvik Municipality, Norway lost the equivalent of US$36 million), relied on these ratings in their decisions to purchase CDOs and other structured finance products. The activities of the ratings agencies have been detailed in many books, including The Big Short by Michael Lewis, Confidence Game by Christine S. Richard, All The Devils are Here by Bethany McClean and Joe Nocera. Janet Tavakoli, author of Structured Finance and Collateralized Debt Obligations, has suggested that these agencies lose their NRSRO status in relation to certain financial products. In 2011, the US Senate released the Levin-Coburn report on "Wall Street and the Financial Crisis"; it did a case study of the behavior of some of the CRAs during the crisis.

== List of NRSROs ==
As of May 2024, ten organizations were designated as NRSROs, including the Big Three.

- AM Best
- DBRS (under Morningstar, Inc.)
- Demotech
- Egan-Jones Ratings Company
- Fitch Ratings
- HR Ratings de México, S.A. de C.V.
- Japan Credit Rating Agency
- Kroll Bond Rating Agency
- Moody's Investors Service
- S&P Global Ratings
