= Big Three (credit rating agencies) =

Three largest credit rating agencies

The Big Three credit rating agencies are S&P Global Ratings, Moody's Ratings, and Fitch Ratings. S&P and Moody's are based in Manhattan; Fitch is dual-headquartered in Manhattan and London and is wholly owned by Hearst Communications through Fitch Group. In the EU the three accounted for 91.87% of credit-rating-agency revenue in 2025 (S&P 50.42%, Moody's 29.63%, Fitch 11.82%). In the US they accounted for 92.9% of outstanding ratings reported by the ten registered nationally recognized statistical rating organizations as of 31 December 2025. A 2013 Council on Foreign Relations summary put their combined global share at "roughly 95%", with S&P and Moody's at about 40% each and Fitch at about 15%.

According to an analysis by Deutsche Welle, "their special status has been cemented by law — at first only in the United States, but then in Europe as well." From the mid-1990s until early 2003, the Big Three were the only "Nationally Recognized Statistical Rating Organizations (NRSROs)" in the United States — a designation meaning they were used by the US government in several regulatory areas. (Four other NRSROs merged with Fitch in the 1990s.) The European Union has considered setting up a state-supported EU-based agency.

The Asian credit rating market is relatively diverse. Due to the regulation by the Chinese central government, the Big Three penetration into the domestic market especially in China is considered less competitive than the local well-recognized agencies, namely China Chengxin International (CCXI), China Lianhe Credit Rating (Lianhe Ratings), Dagong Global Credit Rating, and Pengyuan Credit Rating. In the Indian subcontinent, three out of the six registered credit rating agencies are subsidiaries of the big three – including CRISIL (S&P), ICRA Limited (Moody's) and India Ratings (Fitch).

== Influence ==
=== 2008 financial crisis ===
The Big Three have been "under intense scrutiny" since the 2008 financial crisis following their favorable pre-crisis ratings of insolvent financial institutions like Lehman Brothers, and risky mortgage-related securities that contributed to the collapse of the U.S. housing market.

The Financial Crisis Inquiry Report, the ten-member commission appointed by the United States government with the goal of investigating the causes of the 2008 financial crisis, called out the "failures" of the Big Three rating agencies as "essential cogs in the wheel of financial destruction".

According to the Financial Crisis Inquiry Commission,

The three credit rating agencies were key enablers of the financial meltdown. The mortgage-related securities at the heart of the crisis could not have been marketed and sold without their seal of approval. Investors relied on them, often blindly. In some cases, they were obligated to use them, or regulatory capital standards were hinged on them. This crisis could not have happened without the rating agencies.

In their book on the crisis, journalists Bethany McLean and Joe Nocera criticized rating agencies for continuing "to slap their triple-A [ratings]s on subprime securities even as the underwriting deteriorated – and as the housing boom turned into an outright bubble" in 2005, 2006, and 2007. McLean and Nocera blamed the practice on "an erosion of standards, a willful suspension of skepticism, a hunger for big fees and market share, and an inability to stand up to" investment banks issuing the securities. The February 5, 2013 issue of The Economist stated "it is beyond argument that ratings agencies did a horrendous job evaluating mortgage-tied securities before the financial crisis hit."

== Notable downgrades ==
- August 2011, S&P downgraded the long-held triple-A rating of US securities.
- August 2023, Fitch downgraded its credit-rating of United States Treasuries from AAA to AA+, as S&P had twelve years earlier.
- April 2025, Fitch downgraded China's credit rating from A+ to A, highlighting concerns over rising public debt.
- May 2025, Moody's downgraded its United States long-term issuer and senior unsecured ratings to Aa1 from Aaa.
- October 2025, both Fitch and S&P lowered France's sovereign rating to A+. Major emerging economies also faced pressure.

== Overreliance on the Big Three ==
A common criticism of the Big Three, and one that was highly linked to bank failure in the 2008 recession, is the dominance the agencies had on the market. As the three agencies held 95% of the market share, there was very little room for competition. Many feel this was a crucial contributor to the toxic debt-instrument environment that led to the financial downturn. In a preliminary exchange of views in the European Parliament Committee on Economic and Monetary Affairs, held in late 2011, it was advocated that more competition should exist amongst rating agencies. The belief was that this would diminish conflicts of interest and create more transparent criteria for rating sovereign debt.

There are over 100 national and regional rating agencies which could issue ratings if they can build up their credibility by meeting the conditions for being registered by European Securities and Markets Authority (ESMA). They could also use data from the European Central Bank and the International Monetary Fund to help with their analyses. Reliance on the "Big Three" could also be reduced by big companies assessing themselves, MEPs added.

In November 2013, credit ratings organizations from five countries (CPR of Portugal, CARE Rating of India, GCR of South Africa, MARC of Malaysia, and SR Rating of Brazil) joint ventured to launch ARC Ratings, a new global agency touted as an alternative to the "Big Three".

With the strategy of business internationalization as instructed by the Chinese central government, the Chinese rating agencies began establishing international branches in Hong Kong since 2012. As of 2020, the major Chinese international credit rating agencies are Lianhe Rating Global, China Chengxin (Asia Pacific) and Pengyuan International. They are regarded as domestic rivals against the Big Three.

In 2023, the Indian government's Chief Economic Advisor, V Anantha Nageswaran questioned India's sovereign credit rating of BBB− by S&P and Baa3 by Moody's and called for a review of the big three's rating methods.
