= Federal savings association =

Federal savings associations (also called "federal thrifts" or "federal Savings Banks"), in the United States, are institutions chartered by the Office of Thrift Supervision which is now administered by Office of the Comptroller of the Currency after the agencies merged. Institutions chartered by the OTS are still regulated according to the rules and regulations of Federal Savings Banks. Mortgages issued by Federal Savings Banks are pursuant to the provisions of the Home Owners' Loan Act, a U.S. federal statute. Although the activities of federal thrifts were once confined primarily to taking deposits from consumers and making residential mortgage loans, federal thrifts are now authorized to offer a wide range of financial products and services.

Federal thrifts should not be confused with national banks which are banks chartered under federal law by the Office of the Comptroller of the Currency. Although the differences between federal thrifts and national banks have diminished as the authorized activities of federal thrifts have expanded to include virtually all traditional banking activities, they are still distinct institutions subject to different regulatory schemes and supervised by different regulators. They are not savings and loan associations.

== See also ==
- USAA Federal Savings Bank
