= Japan Credit Rating Agency =

Japanese credit reporting agency

The Japan Credit Rating Agency (JCR; Japanese: 日本格付研究所), established in 1985, is a Japanese financial services company which publishes credit ratings to Japanese companies, local governments, and other interested parties. It provides ratings for 70% of financial companies and 60% of companies in other industries in Japan.

The company is one of the Japanese credit rating agencies which the Japanese financial service agency has approved as eligible for Japanese local banks to utilize under the Basel II framework. Currently, the Japan Credit Rating Agency has 584 million yen in paid-in capital. The company is recognized in many other countries (Turkey, Thailand, Indonesia, Hong Kong, and the U.S.) and the EU.
