= Moody's Ratings =

Bond credits rating business of Moody's Corporation

Moody's Investors Service, Inc.
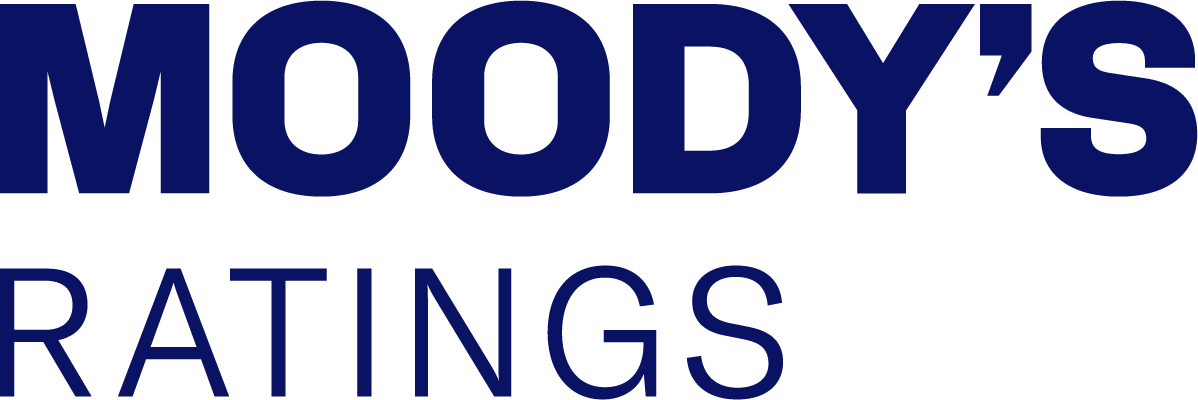
- Trade name: Moody's Ratings
- Formerly: Moody's Investors Service (1914–2024)
- Type: Subsidiary
- Industry: Bond credit ratings
- Predecessor: Moody's Analyses Publishing Company
- Founded: 1909 (117 years ago)
- Founder: John Moody
- Headquarters: 7 World Trade Center, Manhattan, U.S.
- Revenue: US$5.916 billion (2023)
- Number of employees: 5,076 (2020)
- Parent: Moody's Corporation
- Website: ratings.moodys.io

Moody's Ratings is the credit ratings division of Moody's Corporation. It was known as Moody's Investors Service until March 2024, when the unit was rebranded as Moody's Ratings. Moody's Ratings provides international financial research on bonds issued by commercial and government entities. Along with Standard & Poor's and Fitch Group, Moody's is one of the Big Three credit rating agencies.

The company ranks the creditworthiness of borrowers using a standardized ratings scale which measures expected investor loss in the event of default. Moody's Ratings rates debt securities in several bond market segments. These include government, municipal and corporate bonds; managed investments such as money market funds and fixed-income funds; financial institutions including banks and non-bank finance companies; and asset classes in structured finance. In Moody's Ratings system, securities are assigned a rating from Aaa to C, with Aaa being the highest quality and C the lowest quality.

Moody's was founded by John Moody in 1909, to produce manuals of statistics related to stocks and bonds and bond ratings. In 1975, the company was identified as a nationally recognized statistical rating organization (NRSRO) by the U.S. Securities and Exchange Commission. Following several decades of ownership by Dun & Bradstreet, Moody's Investors Service became a separate company in 2000. Moody's Corporation was established as a holding company. On March 6, 2024, Moody's Investors Service was renamed to Moody's Ratings.

== Role in capital markets ==
Together, Moody's, S&P and Fitch are sometimes referred to as the Big Three credit rating agencies. While credit rating agencies are sometimes viewed as interchangeable, Moody's, S&P and Fitch have different methodologies. All three operate worldwide, maintaining offices on six continents, and rating tens of trillions of dollars in securities.

Moody's Ratings and its close competitors play a key role in global capital markets as supplementary, third-party providers of credit analysis used by banks and other investors when assessing the credit risk of particular securities. This form of third party analysis is particularly useful for smaller and less sophisticated investors, as well as for all investors to use as an external comparison for their own judgments.

Credit rating agencies also play an important role in the laws and regulations of the United States and several other countries, such as those of the European Union. In the United States their credit ratings are used in regulation by the U.S. Securities and Exchange Commission as nationally recognized statistical rating organizations (NRSROs) for a variety of regulatory purposes. Among the effects of regulatory use was to enable lower-rated companies to sell bond debt for the first time; their lower ratings merely distinguished them from higher-rated companies, rather than excluding them altogether, as had been the case. However, another aspect of mechanical use of ratings by regulatory agencies has been to reinforce "pro-cyclical" and "cliff effects" of downgrades. In October 2010, the Financial Stability Board (FSB) created a set of "principles to reduce reliance" on credit rating agencies in the laws, regulations and market practices of G-20 member countries. Since the early 1990s, the SEC has also used NRSRO ratings in measuring the commercial paper held by money market funds.

The SEC has designated seven other firms as NRSROs, including, for example, A. M. Best, which focuses on obligations of insurance companies. Companies with which Moody's competes in specific areas include investment research company Morningstar, Inc. and publishers of financial information for investors such as Thomson Reuters and Bloomberg L.P.

Especially since the early 2000s, Moody's frequently makes its analysts available to journalists, and issues regular public statements on credit conditions. Moody's, like S&P, organizes public seminars to educate first-time securities issuers on the information it uses to analyze debt securities.

Moody's purchased a controlling share in the "climate risk data firm" Four Twenty Seven in 2019.

== Moody's credit ratings ==
According to Moody's, the purpose of its ratings is to "provide investors with a simple system of gradation by which future relative creditworthiness of securities may be gauged". To each of its ratings from Aa through Caa, Moody's appends numerical modifiers 1, 2 and 3; the lower the number, the higher-end the rating. Aaa, Ca and C are not modified this way. As Moody's explains, its ratings are "not to be construed as recommendations", nor are they intended to be a sole basis for investment decisions. In addition, its ratings do not speak to market price, although market conditions may affect credit risk.

Moody's credit ratings
Investment grade
Rating	Long-term ratings	Short-term ratings
Aaa	Rated as the highest quality and lowest credit risk.	Prime-1; Best ability to repay short-term debt
Aa1	Rated as high quality and very low credit risk.	Prime-1; Best ability to repay short-term debt
Aa2	Rated as high quality and very low credit risk.	Prime-1; Best ability to repay short-term debt
Aa3	Rated as high quality and very low credit risk.	Prime-1; Best ability to repay short-term debt
A1	Rated as upper-medium grade and low credit risk.	Prime-1; Best ability to repay short-term debt
A2	Rated as upper-medium grade and low credit risk.	Prime-1/Prime-2; Best ability or high ability to repay short term debt
A3	Rated as upper-medium grade and low credit risk.	Prime-1/Prime-2; Best ability or high ability to repay short term debt
Baa1	Rated as medium grade, with some speculative elements and moderate credit risk.	Prime-2; High ability to repay short term debt
Baa2	Rated as medium grade, with some speculative elements and moderate credit risk.	Prime-2/Prime-3; High ability or acceptable ability to repay short term debt
Baa3	Rated as medium grade, with some speculative elements and moderate credit risk.	Prime-3; Acceptable ability to repay short term debt
Speculative grade / Subprime
Rating	Long-term ratings	Short-term ratings
Ba1	Judged to have speculative elements and a significant credit risk.	Not Prime; Do not fall within any of the prime categories
Ba2	Judged to have speculative elements and a significant credit risk.	Not Prime; Do not fall within any of the prime categories
Ba3	Judged to have speculative elements and a significant credit risk.	Not Prime; Do not fall within any of the prime categories
B1	Judged as being speculative and a high credit risk.	Not Prime; Do not fall within any of the prime categories
B2	Judged as being speculative and a high credit risk.	Not Prime; Do not fall within any of the prime categories
B3	Judged as being speculative and a high credit risk.	Not Prime; Do not fall within any of the prime categories
Caa1	Rated as poor quality and very high credit risk.	Not Prime; Do not fall within any of the prime categories
Caa2	Rated as poor quality and very high credit risk.	Not Prime; Do not fall within any of the prime categories
Caa3	Rated as poor quality and very high credit risk.	Not Prime; Do not fall within any of the prime categories
Ca	Judged to be highly speculative and with likelihood of being near or in default, but some possibility of recovering principal and interest.	Not Prime; Do not fall within any of the prime categories
C	Rated as the lowest quality, usually in default and low likelihood of recovering principal or interest.	Not Prime; Do not fall within any of the prime categories

== History of Moody's ==
=== Founding and early history ===
Moody's traces its history back to two publishing companies established by John Moody, the inventor of modern bond credit ratings. In 1900, Moody published his first market assessment, called Moody's Manual of Industrial and Miscellaneous Securities, and established John Moody & Company. The publication provided detailed statistics relating to stocks and bonds of financial institutions, government agencies, manufacturing, mining, utilities, and food companies. It experienced early success, selling out its first print run in its first two months. By 1903, Moody's Manual was a nationally recognized publication. Moody was forced to sell his business, due to a shortage of capital, when the Panic of 1907 fueled several changes in the markets.

Moody returned in 1909 with a new publication focused solely on railroad bonds, Analysis of Railroad Investments, and a new company, Moody's Analyses Publishing Company. While Moody acknowledged that the concept of bond ratings "was not entirely original" with him—he credited early bond rating efforts in Vienna and Berlin as inspiration—he was the first to publish them widely, in an accessible format. Moody was also the first to charge subscription fees to investors. In 1913 he expanded the manual's focus to include industrial firms and utilities; the new Moody's Manual offered ratings of public securities, indicated by a letter-rating system borrowed from mercantile credit-reporting firms. The following year, Moody incorporated the company as Moody's Investors Service. Other rating companies followed over the next few years, including the antecedents of the "Big Three" credit rating agencies: Poor's in 1916, Standard Statistics Company in 1922, and the Fitch Publishing Company in 1924.

Moody's expanded its focus to include ratings for U.S. state and local government bonds in 1919 and, by 1924, Moody's rated nearly the entire U.S. bond market.

=== 1930s to mid-century ===
The relationship between the U.S. bond market and rating agencies developed further in the 1930s. As the market grew beyond that of traditional investment banking institutions, new investors again called for increased transparency, leading to the passage of new, mandatory disclosure laws for issuers, and the creation of the Securities and Exchange Commission (SEC). In 1936 a new set of laws were introduced, prohibiting banks from investing in "speculative investment securities" ("junk bonds", in modern terminology) as determined by "recognized rating manuals". Banks were permitted only to hold "investment grade" bonds, following the judgment of Moody's, along with Standard, Poor's and Fitch. In the decades that followed, state insurance regulators approved similar requirements.

In 1962, Moody's Investors Service was bought by Dun & Bradstreet, a firm engaged in the related field of credit reporting, although they continued to operate largely as independent companies.

=== 1970s to 2000 ===
In the late 1960s and 1970s, commercial paper and bank deposits began to be rated. As well, the major agencies began charging the issuers of bonds as well as investors — Moody's began doing this in 1970 — thanks in part to a growing free rider problem related to the increasing availability of inexpensive photocopy machines, and the increased complexity of the financial markets. Rating agencies also grew in size as the number of issuers grew, both in the United States and abroad, making the credit rating business significantly more profitable. In 2005 Moody's estimated that 90% of credit rating agency revenues came from issuer fees.

The end of the Bretton Woods system in 1971 led to the liberalization of financial regulations, and the global expansion of capital markets in the 1970s and 1980s. In 1975, the SEC changed its minimum capital requirements for broker-dealers, using bond ratings as a measurement. Moody's and nine other agencies (later five, due to consolidation) were identified by the SEC as "nationally recognized statistical ratings organizations" (NRSROs) for broker-dealers to use in meeting these requirements.

The 1980s and beyond saw the global capital market expand; Moody's opened its first overseas offices in Japan in 1985, followed by offices in the United Kingdom in 1986, France in 1988, Germany in 1991, Hong Kong in 1994, India in 1998 and China in 2001. The number of bonds rated by Moody's and the Big Three agencies grew substantially as well. As of 1997, Moody's was rating about $5 trillion in securities from 20,000 U.S. and 1,200 non-U.S. issuers. The 1990s and 2000s were also a time of increased scrutiny, as Moody's was sued by unhappy issuers and investigation by the U.S. Department of Justice, as well as criticism following the Enron scandal, the U.S. subprime mortgage crisis, and the 2008 financial crisis.

In 1998, Dun & Bradstreet sold the Moody's publishing business to Financial Communications (later renamed Mergent). Following several years of rumors and pressure from institutional shareholders, in December 1999 Moody's parent Dun & Bradstreet announced it would spin off Moody's Investors Service into a separate publicly traded company. Although Moody's had fewer than 1,500 employees in its division, it represented about 51% of Dun & Bradstreet profits in the year before the announcement. The spin-off was completed on September 30, 2000, and, in the half decade that followed, the value of Moody's shares improved by more than 300%.

=== Structured finance boom and after ===
Structured finance went from 28% of Moody's revenue in 1998 to almost 50% in 2007, and "accounted for pretty much all of Moody's growth" during that time. According to the Financial Crisis Inquiry Report, during the years 2005, 2006, and 2007, rating of structured finance products such as mortgage-backed securities made up close to half of Moody's rating revenues. From 2000 to 2007, revenues from rating structured financial instruments increased more than fourfold. However, there was some question about the models Moody's used to give structured products high ratings. In June 2005, shortly before the subprime mortgage crisis, Moody's updated its approach for estimating default correlation of non-prime/nontraditional mortgages involved in structured financial products like mortgage-backed securities and Collateralized debt obligations. Its new model was based on trends from the previous 20 years, during which time housing prices had been rising, mortgage delinquencies very low, and nontraditional mortgage products a very small niche of the market.

On July 10, 2007, in "an unprecedented move", Moody's downgraded 399 subprime mortgage-backed securities that had been issued the year before. Three months later, it downgraded another 2506 tranches ($33.4 billion). By the end of the crisis, Moody's downgraded 83% of all the 2006 Aaa mortgage backed security tranches and all of the Baa tranches.

In June 2013, Moody's Investor Service has warned that Thailand's credit rating may be damaged due to an increasingly costly rice-pledging scheme which lost 200 billion baht ($6.5 billion) in 2011–2012.

== Controversies ==
=== Sovereign downgrades ===
Moody's, along with the other major credit rating agencies, is often the subject of criticism from countries whose public debt is downgraded, generally claiming increased cost of borrowing as a result of the downgrade. Examples of sovereign debt downgrades that attracted significant media attention at the time include Australia in the 1980s, Canada and Japan in the 1990s, Thailand during the 1997 Asian financial crisis, and Portugal in 2011 following the European sovereign debt crisis.

=== Unsolicited ratings ===
Moody's has occasionally faced litigation from entities whose bonds it has rated on an unsolicited basis, and investigations concerning such unsolicited ratings. In October 1995, the school district of Jefferson County, Colorado sued Moody's, claiming the unsolicited assignment of a "negative outlook" to a 1993 bond issue was based on Jefferson County having selected S&P and Fitch to do its rating. Moody's rating raised the issuing cost to Jefferson County by $769,000. Moody's argued that its assessment was "opinion" and therefore constitutionally protected; the court agreed, and the decision was upheld on appeal.

In the mid-1990s, the U.S. Justice Department's antitrust division opened an investigation to determine whether unsolicited ratings amounted to an illegal exercise of market power, however the investigation was closed with no antitrust charges filed. Moody's has pointed out that it has assigned unsolicited ratings since 1909, and that such ratings are the market's "best defense against rating shopping" by issuers. In November 1999, Moody's announced it would begin identifying which ratings were unsolicited as part of a general move toward greater transparency. The agency faced a similar complaint in the mid-2000s from Hannover Re, a German insurer that lost $175 million in market value when its bonds were lowered to "junk" status. In 2005, unsolicited ratings were at the center of a subpoena by the New York Attorney General's office under Eliot Spitzer, but again no charges were filed.

Following the 2008 financial crisis, the SEC adopted new rules for the rating agency industry, including one to encourage unsolicited ratings. The intent of the rule is to counteract potential conflicts of interest in the issuer-pays model by ensuring a "broader range of views on the creditworthiness" of a security or instrument.

=== Alleged conflicts of interest ===
The "issuer pays" business model adopted in the 1970s by Moody's and other rating agencies has been criticized for creating a possible conflict of interest, supposing that rating agencies may artificially boost the rating of a given security in order to please the issuer. The SEC recently acknowledged, however, in its September 30, 2011 summary report of its mandatory annual examination of NRSROs that the subscriber-pays model under which Moody's operated prior to adopting the issuer pays model also "presents certain conflicts of interest inherent in the fact that subscribers, on whom the NRSRO relies, have an interest in ratings actions and could exert pressure on the NRSRO for certain outcomes". Other alleged conflicts of interest, also the subject of a Department of Justice investigation the mid-1990s, raised the question of whether Moody's pressured issuers to use its consulting services upon threat of a lower bond rating. Moody's has maintained that its reputation in the market is the balancing factor, and a 2003 study, covering 1997 to 2002, suggested that "reputation effects" outweighed conflicts of interest. Thomas McGuire, a former executive vice president, said in 1995 that: "[W]hat's driving us is primarily the issue of preserving our track record. That's our bread and butter".

In March 2021, Moody's reached a settlement with the European Union regarding alleged conflicts of interest. Moody's was fined 3.7 million euros ($4.35 million).

=== 2008 financial crisis ===
The 2008 financial crisis led to increased scrutiny to credit rating agencies' assessments of complex structured finance securities. Moody's and its close competitors were subject to criticism following large downgrade actions beginning in July 2007. According to the Financial Crisis Inquiry Report, 83% of the mortgage-backed securities Moody's had rated triple-A in 2006 were downgraded to junk by 2010. In its "Conclusions on Chapter 8", the Financial Crisis Inquiry Commission stated: "There was a clear failure of corporate governance at Moody's, which did not ensure the quality of its ratings on tens of thousands of mortgage-backed securities and CDOs."

Faced with having to put more capital against lower rated securities, investors such as banks, pension funds and insurance companies sought to sell their residential mortgage-backed securities (RMBS) and collateralized debt obligation (CDO) holdings. The value of these securities held by financial firms declined, and the market for new subprime securitizations dried up. Some academics and industry observers have argued that the rating agencies' mass downgrades were part of the "perfect storm" of events leading up to the 2008 financial crisis.

In 2008, a study group established by the Committee on the Global Financial System (CGFS), a committee of the Bank for International Settlements, found that rating agencies had underestimated the severity of the subprime mortgage crisis, as had "many market participants". According to the CGFS, significant contributing factors included "limited historical data" and an underestimation of "originator risk" factors. The CGFS also found that agency ratings should "support, not replace, investor due diligence" and that agencies should provide "better information on the key risk factors" of structured finance ratings. In October 2007, Moody's further refined its criteria for originators, "with loss expectations increasing significantly from the highest to the lowest tier". In May 2008, Moody's proposed adding "volatility scores and loss sensitivities" to its existing rankings. Although the rating agencies were criticized for "technical failings and inadequate resources", the FSB stated that the agencies' "need to repair their reputation was seen as a powerful force" for change. Moody's has in fact lost market share in certain sectors due to its tightened rating standards on some asset-backed securities, for example the commercial mortgage-backed securities (CMBS) market in 2007.

In April 2013, Moody's, along with Standard & Poor's and Morgan Stanley, settled fourteen lawsuits filed by groups including Abu Dhabi Commercial Bank and King County, Washington. The lawsuits alleged that the agencies inflated their ratings on purchased structured investment vehicles.

In January 2017, Moody's agreed to pay nearly $864 million to resolve federal and state civil claims related to pre-crisis ratings practices, while committing to business-practice changes. In 2021, the European Securities and Markets Authority fined five Moody's entities €3.7 million over conflicts-of-interest disclosure failures.

== Global Credit Research ==
In March 2013 Moody's Investors Service published their report entitled Cash Pile Grows 10% to $1.45 Trillion; Overseas Holdings Continue to Expand in their Global Credit Research series, in which they examined companies they rate in the US non-financial corporate sector (NFCS). According to their report, by the end of 2012 the US NFCS held "$1.45 trillion in cash", 10% more than in 2011. At the end of 2011, US NFCS held $1.32 trillion in cash which was already a record level. "Of the $1.32 trillion for all the rated companies, Moody's estimates that $840 billion, or 58% of the total cash, is held overseas."

== See also ==
- Capital IQ
- Compustat
- CRISIL
- ICRA Limited
- Dominion Bond Rating Service
- Dagong Europe Credit Rating
- Dagong Global Credit Rating
- Global Industry Classification Standard
- Leveraged Commentary & Data
- List of countries by credit rating
- Moody's Aaa Bond
- Moody's Analytics
- Reuters
- Spread Research
