= February 1958 =

Month of 1958

<<	February 1958					>>
Su	Mo	Tu	We	Th	Fr	Sa
						1
2	3	4	5	6	7	8
9	10	11	12	13	14	15
16	17	18	19	20	21	22
23	24	25	26	27	28

Egypt and...

...Syria merge...

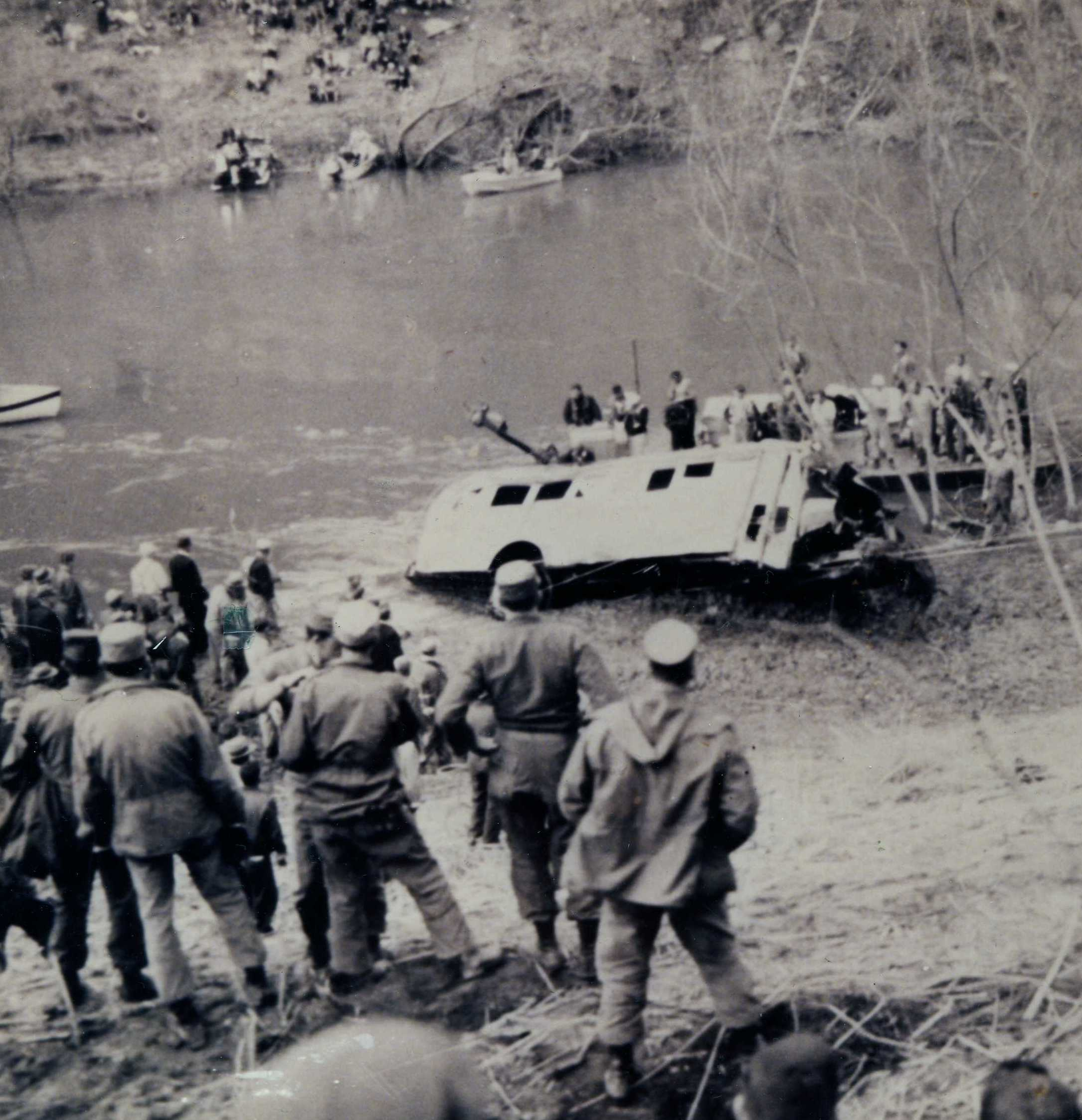
February 28, 1958: Deadliest school bus accident in U.S. history kills 26 students on their way to school

...to create United Arab Republic

The following events occurred in February 1958:

== February 1, 1958 (Saturday) ==
- King Mahendra of Nepal announced plans for free elections to take place in 1959 and the establishment of a democratic constitution.

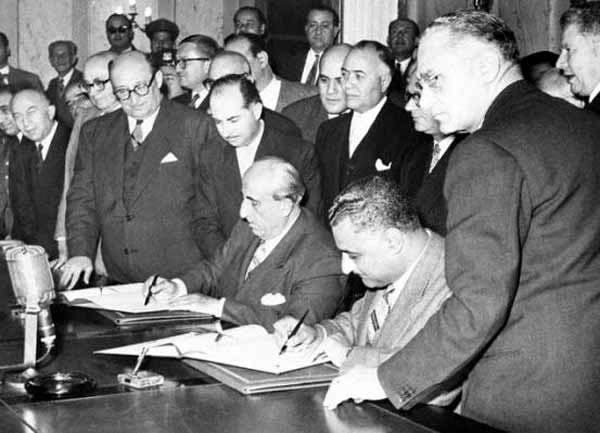
President Quwatli (left) and President Nasser signing the merger pact

- Egypt and Syria announced the formation of the United Arab Republic, as President Quwatli of Syria signed a pact with Egypt's President Nasser at the Koubba Palace in Cairo.
- Domenico Modugno, paired with Johnny Dorelli, won the 8. Sanremo Festival with "Volare", composed by Modugno; Nilla Pizzi was runner-up with "L'edera". Modugno's resounding and unexpected success marked a turning point for the Italian song, until then bound to the traditional melodic formulas.
- Canada's Governor General, Viscount Massey, dissolved parliament at the request of Prime Minister John Diefenbaker, and scheduled elections for the Canadian House of Commons for March 31.
- Forty-seven people were killed in the collision of a U.S. Air Force C-118A transport plane with 41 people on board, and a U.S. Navy P2V Neptune patrol plane with a crew of seven. The planes collided over the Los Angeles suburb of Norwalk, California. The C-118 plane crashed into the parking lot of the Norwalk Sheriff's Department at the intersection of Firestone Boulevard and Pioneer Boulevard, and there were no survivors. Two men survived the crash of the P2V, which came down in a vacant area at the Santa Fe Springs Fire Station. A woman in Norwalk was killed 3,000 feet (910 m) from the C-118 crash site as she stepped outside of her home to see what had happened, and "was cut in half by a flying fragment".
- Died: Clinton Davisson, 76, American physicist and 1937 Nobel Prize laureate known for his discovery of electron diffraction in the Davisson–Germer experiment

== February 2, 1958 (Sunday) ==
- Mario Echandi Jiménez was elected as President of Costa Rica, defeating Francisco Orlich Bolmarcich in a close race.
- The word "aerospace", originally spelled "aero-space", was coined by the staff of the Air University at Maxwell Air Force Base in Montgomery, Alabama, as part of an "interim glossary" that was to be used for jargon in the U.S. Air Force. The term, referring to the atmosphere and outer space as one unit, was derived from "aero-", a Greek suffix for air, and "space", from Latin "spatium", an extension into the beyond.
- Born: Paolo De Castro, Italian professor and politician, in San Pietro in Vernotico
- Died: Bertrand Snell, 87, U.S. Congressman for New York and House Minority Leader from 1931 to 1938

== February 3, 1958 (Monday) ==
- Nikolai Bulganin's letter to Dwight D. Eisenhower, the third in eight weeks and containing a nine-point agenda for a summit, was made public.
- Died: Wilfred Fienburgh, 38, English TV and print journalist, and member of the British House of Commons, died from injuries sustained two days earlier when he lost control of his car and crashed into a lamppost in London. In December, he had written to a newspaper, in his lifetime he had "been run over by a taxi and knocked down by a pram," and that "In cars and jeeps I have hit a tree, a railway bridge, my own garden fence, three other cars, a four-ton RAF lorry, a policeman and the side of a battle cruiser. I must be, I think, accident prone."

== February 4, 1958 (Tuesday) ==
- The Marie Byrd Land Traverse Party discovered Mount Moore in Antarctica.
- An antitrust lawsuit against United Fruit Company by the U.S. Department of Justice ended after four years, as the company, which controlled the majority of "the world's marketable supply of bananas", agreed that it would create a competing company.
- Born: Tomasz Pacynski, Polish fantasy and science fiction author; in Warsaw (d. 2005)
- Died: Filippo Andrea VI Doria Pamphili, 71, former Mayor of Rome

== February 5, 1958 (Wednesday) ==
- The Communist government arrested Chinese Jesuit and Roman Catholic bishop Dominic Tang (born Tang Yiming) in Guangzhou (at the time, Canton); he would remain in jail for 22 years. Tang was charged by the People's Republic as being "the most faithful running-dog of the reactionary Vatican" and held in a labor camp, without ever being brought to trial. He would be released on June 2, 1980, because of illness and would live 14 more years before his death in 1995.
- Egypt's President Gamal Abdel Nasser became the first president of the United Arab Republic, with Syrian President Shukri al-Quwatli as the UAR vice president. In the evening, Nasser welcomed an official from the Kingdom of Yemen, Crown Prince Saif al-Islam Mohammed al-Badr, who had said that he wanted his monarchy to become a third member of the republic, while retaining its royal government and receiving Egyptian troops to aid it in its war against British forces in Aden, a request that was ultimately rejected.
- The Republic of Turkey created its first national park, the Yozgat Pine Grove, to protect a rare species of pine trees found only in Turkey's Caucasus Mountains.
- In France, the parliament voted a framework-law about Algeria, establishing single electoral districts for Frenchmen and Muslims and reaffirming the principle that Algeria was an overseas department of the French republic. On the same evening, a time bomb exploded in a bathroom in the Palais Bourbon, causing damage but no injuries.
- A 7,600 pound (3,500 kg) Mark 15 hydrogen bomb was dropped into the waters off the coast of Tybee Island, Georgia, near Savannah, after the U.S. Air Force B-47 bomber carrying it collided with a U.S. Navy F-86 fighter at an altitude of 35,000 feet (11,000 m). The Air Force emphasized that the bomb "was not assembled so that it could not be detonated." The bomb was never recovered.
- At Cape Canaveral, the launching of a second American satellite, Vanguard 1B, by the U.S. Navy failed 62 seconds after it started. The Vanguard 1 rocket was launched at 2:33 in the morning "only apparently to break in half" and had to be destroyed by remote command from the range safety officer.
- Born: Fabrizio Frizzi, Italian TV presenter; in Rome (d. 2018)

== February 6, 1958 (Thursday) ==
American newsreel footage reporting the crash

- The crash of British European Airways Flight 609 killed 23 of the 44 people on board an Airspeed AS.57 Ambassador plane, including seven players on the defending English soccer football champions, Manchester United F.C., who were flying back to Manchester from West Germany after a European Cup game in Yugoslavia. The Ambassador plane had taken the Man U team to Belgrade (where it played to a 3 to 3 draw against Red Star Belgrade), and landed at Munich in West Germany for refueling, touching down in snowy weather. The crew abandoned two takeoff attempts and taxied back to the tarmac, then concluded that opening the throttles more slowly would provide the power to make a safe takeoff. Accelerating to 117 knots (equivalent to 135 miles per hour (217 km/h)), the plane encountered slush on the runway, slowed to 105 knots, and was unable to get airborne or to have enough runway length to stop. The airplane crashed through a boundary fence and across a small road, then slammed into a house and a garage, where it burst into flames.
- The United States Senate passed a resolution (S Res 256) creating a special Committee on Space and Astronautics to frame legislation for a national program for space exploration.
- The Defense Advanced Research Projects Agency (DARPA), the first U.S. government agency devoted to space exploration, was founded.
- Born:
  - Giuseppe Baresi, Italian soccer football player, in Travagliato
  - Michel Houellebecq, French writer; in Saint-Pierre
- Died: Charles Langbridge Morgan, 64, English writer

== February 7, 1958 (Friday) ==
- U.S. President Dwight D. Eisenhower authorized the creation of the Defense Advanced Research Projects Agency (DARPA, initially called ARPA) within the U.S. Department of Defense, initially to develop a program to compete with the Soviet Union's space program. The Defense Department established the agency by its DOD Directive 5105.15, and Congress authorized its funding on February 12. The DARPA program would become the foremost government developer of technological advances that would transition from military to civilian use.
- The Partito Comunista Italiano (PCI), Italy's Communist party, announced that it had lost 300,000 members in the previous two years as a result of the crushing of the Hungarian Revolution by Soviet invaders.
- The legal monopoly on transcontinental air service, granted by the Canadian government to Trans-Canada Air Lines, was ended by Transport Minister George Hees.
- Died: Walter Kingsford, 76, British stage, film and television actor

== February 8, 1958 (Saturday) ==
- In a purge of the ruling East German Communist Party, Deputy Premier Fred Oelßner was expelled from the Politburo of the Socialist Unity Party of Germany (Sozialistische Einheitspartei Deutschlands or SED) at the instigation of General Secretary Walter Ulbricht, because of his dissent from Ulbricht's official policies. The SED's Central Committee also expelled two liberal members, Karl Schirdewan and former Security Minister Ernst Wollweber, on the same day for "violations of Party rules". The move came two days after being approved by the Central Committee of the SED in a closed-door session, where Committee members Albert Norden and Franz Dahlem said that Schirdewan had been seeking to get the committee to replace Ulbricht as the party leader. Norden's and Dahlem's speeches were reprinted on February 26 by the SED Party newspaper, Neues Deutschland.
- A fleet of 25 French Air Force bombers and fighters crossed from French Algeria into Tunisian airspace and bombed the village of Sakiet Sidi Youssef, killing 68 people, 12 of whom were children. The attack was in reprisal for a January 11 attack, launched from Tunisia by FLN guerrillas from the town, that killed 15 French soldiers, and France claimed that one of its planes had been shot down over Algeria by anti-aircraft guns fired from the Tunisian side of the border. The Tunisian government protested and demanded that all French troops in Tunisia leave immediately.
- Born: Marina Silva, Brazilian environmentalist and politician; in Rio Branco

== February 9, 1958 (Sunday) ==
- Single-candidate elections were held in the South American nation of Paraguay to approve a full term for the incumbent president, General Alfredo Stroessner, and the 60 candidates fielded by Stroessner's Partido Colorado for the unicameral Chamber of Representatives.
- At the School of Aviation Medicine on Randolph Air Force Base in San Antonio, Texas, 23-year-old USAF Airman Donald G. Farrell volunteered to start the simulation of a space flight in an airtight steel cabin, breathing air at one-half atmospheric pressure, eating condensed foods, and unable to stand up or lie down in the small, equipment-filled space. Farrell ended his simulation six days later with no ill effects. As a volunteer, he had the right to terminate the experiment at any time by pushing a "panic button" to be released. According to journalist Thomas Vinciguerra, writing in The New York Times in 2019, a February 24 TIME magazine article about the simulation with Farrell "almost certainly" inspired Rod Serling to write the pilot episode of The Twilight Zone, "Where Is Everybody?", which would be broadcast on October 2, 1959.

== February 10, 1958 (Monday) ==
- From his headquarters in Indonesia on the island of Sumatra, Army Lieutenant Colonel Ahmad Husein announced the "Charter of the Struggle to Save the Country", a five-day ultimatum to the Indonesian central government to institute reforms and to remove pro-Communist members of President Sukarno's cabinet. When the government responded by dismissing Hussein and three other rebels from the Army, and rejected the demands, the rebels formed the Revolutionary Government of the Republic of Indonesia (PRRI) on the island of Sumatra and started a rebellion.
- The U.S. Navy announced that it had developed a new anti-submarine weapon, the Rocket Assisted Torpedo (RAT), which it described as "the greatest advancement in anti-submarine warfare since World War II" to combat "one of the great threats to our nation", submarines "ready to choke off our lifelines across the oceans and to fire missiles with atomic warheads at our production centers."
- A study entitled, "A Program for Expansion of NACA Research Space Flight Technology with Estimates of the Staff and Facilities Required", was published by the NACA staff. The study pointed out the need for buildup of a national capability in space technology leading to flights of crewed space vehicles. Besides devoting some of its laboratory facilities, NACA would integrate into the program the talent of scientific groups outside its organization by an expanded program of contracted research. NACA estimated an additional annual budget of $100 million and 9,000 additional personnel were required. NACA also recommended that over the next five years (1958 - 1962) $55 million be expended in new facility construction to support space research projects. NACA estimated $10 million a year would be needed at the outset of the program for contracted research. NACA reviewed the following specific research projects for active consideration: space propulsion systems for launching and flight; materials and structures; spaceflight research involving launching, rendezvous, reentry, recovery, flight simulation, navigation, guidance, and control; space mechanics and communications; and space environment.
- Born: Thomas Ruff, German photographer; in Zell am Harmersbach
- Died: Aleksander Klumberg, 58, Estonian Olympic decathlete and world record holder, later held as a political prisoner by the Soviet Union

== February 11, 1958 (Tuesday) ==
- The "Great Red Aurora", the strongest recorded solar maximum, reached its peak of activity; a magnetic storm creating a fan shaped-aurora was observed from multiple areas in the Northern Hemisphere starting at 0053 UTC.
- Marshal Chen Yi became the new Chinese Foreign Minister, replacing Zhou Enlai.
- In China, the National People's Congress established the rules for use of the Latin alphabet, pinyin, for use in transliterating Chinese names and words.
- Ruth Carol Taylor became the first African American stewardess, working on a Mohawk Airlines flight between New York City and Ithaca, New York. Her career would last only six months, not because of her race but because she had gotten married, and the airline had a discriminatory barrier on married flight attendants.
- Died:
  - Ernest Jones, 79, Welsh psychoanalyst
  - William F. Mangels, 92, German-born American inventor and engineer who created various amusement park rides

== February 12, 1958 (Wednesday) ==
- The Soviet Union's Defense Minister, Rodion Malinovsky, formed the Group of Inspectors General as a means of retiring marshals, generals and admirals "who have reached such an age when, for health reasons and the prospects for their further use, cannot continue to work with a full load" from active service and providing them with salaried jobs carrying almost no responsibility.

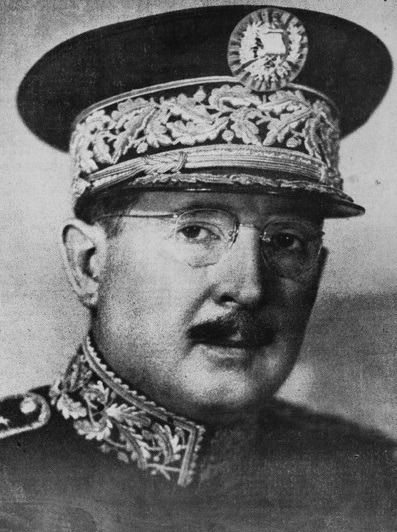
President-elect Ydigoras

- In the Central American nation of Guatemala, the 66-member unicameral Congreso de la República chose a new president after the January 19 presidential election ended with no candidate having a majority of votes. With a choice between the top two finishers in the popular vote, the Congress voted, 40 to 18, to elect General Miguel Ydígoras over Colonel José Luis Cruz Salazar.
- Died:
  - Marcel Cachin, 88, French Communist politician who founded the daily newspaper L'Humanite and ran as the PCF's candidate for president four times, attracting more than 12% of the vote in 1953.
  - Joe Frisco (stage name for Louis Wilson Joseph), 68, American comedian and vaudeville performer
  - Douglas Hartree, 60, English mathematician and physicist known for the Hartree–Fock method of approximation for the determination of the wave function and the energy of a quantum many-body system in a stationary state.

== February 13, 1958 (Thursday) ==
- In Italy, Interior Minister Fernando Tambroni dissolved the Naples City council and former Naples mayor Achille Lauro was indicted for corruption.
- The House of Commons of the United Kingdom voted, 305 to 251, to allow women to serve in the House of Lords for the first time by making life peerages available regardless of gender. The measure had already been approved by the House of Lords but required a third reading in the Commons and royal assent by Queen Elizabeth II.
- The British Ministry of Defence released its annual White Paper, including a report by Defence Minister Duncan Sandys titled "Britain's Contribution to Peace and Security", with the warning that if the Soviet Union attempted to attack the Western powers even with conventional forces, the British would retaliate by using hydrogen bombs and other strategic nuclear weapons.
- The Special Committee on Space Technology, established by NACA on November 21, 1957, met for the first time. The committee established seven working groups: (1) objectives, (2) vehicular program, (3) reentry, (4) range, launch, and tracking facilities, (5) instrumentation, (6) space surveillance, and (7) human factors and training. The objectives group was to draft a complete national program for space research.
- Born: Pernilla August, Swedish film actress; in Stockholm
- Died:
  - Georges Rouault, 86, French painter
  - Helen Twelvetrees, 49, American stage and film actress, by suicide

== February 14, 1958 (Friday) ==
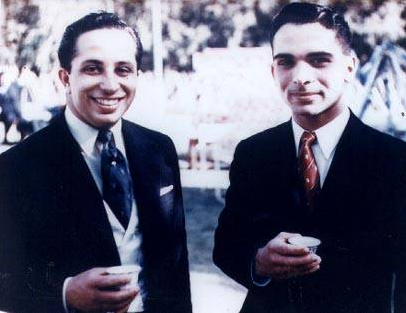
Kings Faisal II and Hussein I

- The Hashemite Arab Federation was created by an agreement of King Faisal II of Iraq and his second cousin, King Hussein of Jordan, both members of the House of Hashem that had ruled parts of the Middle East since 968 AD, and both great-grandsons of Hussein bin Ali, King of Hejaz. The plan was ratified unanimously by Iraq's parliament on February 17. The Federation, with King Faisal II as its ruler, lasted only five months, ending upon Faisal's overthrow and assassination on July 14. It was officially dissolved by its new monarch, King Hussein, on August 2.
- A major revision of the Great Soviet Encyclopedia in its article about Joseph Stalin was made public for the first time, two years after the original scheduled publication was delayed because of First Secretary Khrushchev's 1956 speech to the Congress of the Communist Party condemning the late dictator. Notably, the 87-page biography of Stalin in the previous edition of the Encyclopedia was discarded in favor of a five-page summary that praised him for many achievements but criticized him for the 1930s purging of the Party (with the exception of Leon Trotsky) and Stalin's misjudgments during World War II.
- The Polish government released the Rapacki plan for disarmament in Europe, created by Poland's Foreign Minister Adam Rapacki on October 2, for international consideration, proposing the creation of a nuclear-free zone in NATO member West Germany and three Warsaw Pact members (East Germany, Poland and Czechoslovakia). Eight Warsaw Pact nations endorsed the plan, but none of the NATO members did so.
- In Italy, eight people were killed and 60 injured in an explosion at the Gessolungo sulfur mine, near Caltanissetta.
- The International Geophysical Year (IGY) Committee presented a report entitled, "Basic Objectives of a Continuing Program of Scientific Research in Outer Space". The committee was of the opinion that the need for space research would continue far past the close of the IGY in December 1958.

== February 15, 1958 (Saturday) ==
- Rebel Lieutenant Colonel Ahmad Hussein proclaimed the founding of the PRRI (Pemerintah Revolusioner Republik Indonesia, Revolutionary Government of the Republic of Indonesia) from his base on the island of Sumatra. Sjafruddin Prawiranegara was named by the group of rebels as the PRRI's first Prime Minister and former Indonesian Prime Minister Burhanuddin Harahap was made minister of security and justice.
- All 16 U.S. Air Force personnel on a Douglas C-47 Skytrain were killed when the two-engine airplane crashed into Mount Vesuvius in Italy, shortly after takeoff from Naples en route to Athens.

== February 16, 1958 (Sunday) ==
- The Federal Council for Aboriginal Advancement was founded at the conclusion of a three-day meeting at Adelaide in Australia by representatives of the Aborigines' Advancement League of three states, as well as five other organizations in the first national meeting of rights groups. Dr. Charles Duguid was elected as the FCAA's first president.
- A Korean Air Lines flight from Busan to Seoul in South Korea, with 26 passengers and two American pilots, was hijacked by eight gunmen who had bought tickets for the flight. The airplane was then flown to North Korea. North Korea released the group to United Nations officials on March 6 at the border station at Panmunjom but kept the airplane.
- Born:
  - Nancy Donahue, American fashion model; in Lowell, Massachusetts
  - Ice-T (stage name for Tracy Marrow), American rapper; in Newark, New Jersey
  - Nobutoshi Kaneda, Japanese soccer football midfielder with 58 caps for the national team; in Fuchū, Hiroshima Prefecture
  - Lisa Loring, American actress best known for portraying Wednesday Addams in the 1960s sitcom The Addams Family; in Kwajalein Atoll (d. 2023)
  - Maurizio Zanolla (Manolo), Italian rock climber; in Feltre
- Died:
  - John Moody, American financial analyst who pioneered the quality rating of bonds, securities and stocks starting in 1909 with the first of his series of "Moody's Manual" books, beginning with Moody's Analyses of Railroad Investments.
  - Rudolf Pleil, 33, West German serial killer convicted of murdering 10 people, hanged himself in his jail cell a little more than seven years after being sentenced to life imprisonment.
  - Situ Qiao, 55, Chinese painter

== February 17, 1958 (Monday) ==
- In Indonesia, the Permesta rebel movement on the island of Sulawesi joined forces with the Revolutionary Government of the Republic of Indonesia (PRRI) rebel group that had been set up on Sumatra with an objective of overthrowing the government of the Republic of Indonesia.
- GoldStar, an electronics company and predecessor to LG Electronics, was founded in South Korea as a subsidiary of the LakHui (pronounced "Lucky") Chemical Industrial Corporation, a plastics manufacturer. The companies would be merged to create the Lucky-Gold Star Corporation in 1983, shortened to LG Corporation in 1998.

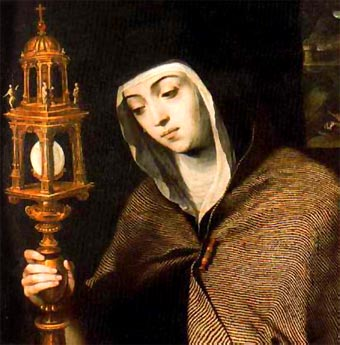
The patron saint of TV

- Pope Pius XII announced a Roman Catholic patron saint for television and all persons involved in TV production, Saint Clare of Assisi (1194—1253). According to the Vatican, Saint Clare was picked because during her final illness in San Damiano, Assisi, "she saw and heard a solemn midnight mass that was being celebrated in the Basilica of St. Francis, two miles away", which church observers at the 700th anniversary of her death said was "a miraculous episode that bore some resemblance to a transmission of images and sounds over a distance."
- Morocco completed the taking of former Spanish currency out of circulation, ending almost half a century of division of the North African nation between Spanish and French protectorate officials of the former French Morocco and Spanish Morocco. King Mohammed V "symbolically struck down a customs barrier" at Rabat and announced the completion of the replacement of more than one billion of the old Spanish pesetas with 100 million of the Moroccan francs.
- France and Tunisia accepted the mediation of Great Britain and the United States to end the conflict between the two nations in North Africa.
- The Campaign for Nuclear Disarmament organization in Britain held its first public meeting.
- The comic strip B. C., written by Johnny Hart and a satire on current events using cavemen and talking animals as its characters, debuted as an offering of the New York Herald Tribune Syndicate. Hart would continue to draw the strip for almost 50 years until his passing (while working on the strip) on April 7, 2007.
- Oliver Treyz became the new president of the American Broadcasting Company (ABC) and cleared the path for several popular television shows, ranging from The Untouchables to The Flintstones. He would step down in 1962 after a particularly violent show led to his subpoena and examination by a U.S. Congressional subcommittee.
- Died: Lillian Lauferty, 68, American novelist and former newspaper columnist who wrote the "Dear Beatrix Fairfax" advice column.

== February 18, 1958 (Tuesday) ==
- United Arab Republic president Gamal Abdel Nasser asked Sudan for cession of all of the "Halaib Triangle" above the 22nd parallel north, offering in exchange renunciation of claims to the smaller Bir Tawil south of the parallel. In Uadi Halfa, the chief town of the 7,950 square miles (20,600 km^{2}) area claimed by both sides, an Egyptian military unit and an electoral commission were sent, in view of the plebiscite for the UAR. Sudan's foreign minister Muhammad Ahmad Mahgoub rejected the Egyptian claim. The dispute would end in 2000, with the withdrawal of Sudanese troops from the Halaib Triangle.
- Poland's government, more tolerant of religion than other Communist nations, granted two requests of the Roman Catholic Archbishop Stefan Wyszynski after three days of meetings. For the first time in almost 10 years, Catholic priests would be granted visas in order to study theology in Rome, with 24 identified by Wyszynski getting the first passports. The Polish government also agreed to return 700 church treasures that had been stolen by Germany during the occupation in World War II and returned after the war to Poland.
- Popular American comedienne Gracie Allen's upcoming retirement from show business was confirmed by George Burns, her husband and comedy partner in the Burns and Allen duo. George Burns, who had played the straight man to Allen's scatterbrained comments, told reporters that television's last original episode of The George Burns and Gracie Allen Show would air on September 22. Of his wife's decision, Burns said, "It was not a sudden one. She has decided to devote herself to her home and family. No one more richly deserves the rest."

== February 19, 1958 (Wednesday) ==
- In the West Bengal state of India, an explosion killed at least 175 coal miners at the Chinakuri Colliery, operated by Bengal Coal Company.
- A group of 22 men who were able to escape the sinking Italian freighter Bonitas in a lifeboat were killed when their lifeboat capsized in the Atlantic Ocean just as a rescue ship was reaching them. An American cargo ship, President Adams, had located the Bonitas 120 miles (190 km) off the coast of the U.S. state of North Carolina and was prepared to take on the lifeboat's 25 passengers when a large wave threw most of them into icy waters. A boat from the President Adams was only able to pull three men aboard; two more crewmembers in a separate lifeboat were rescued by the destroyer USS Lester.

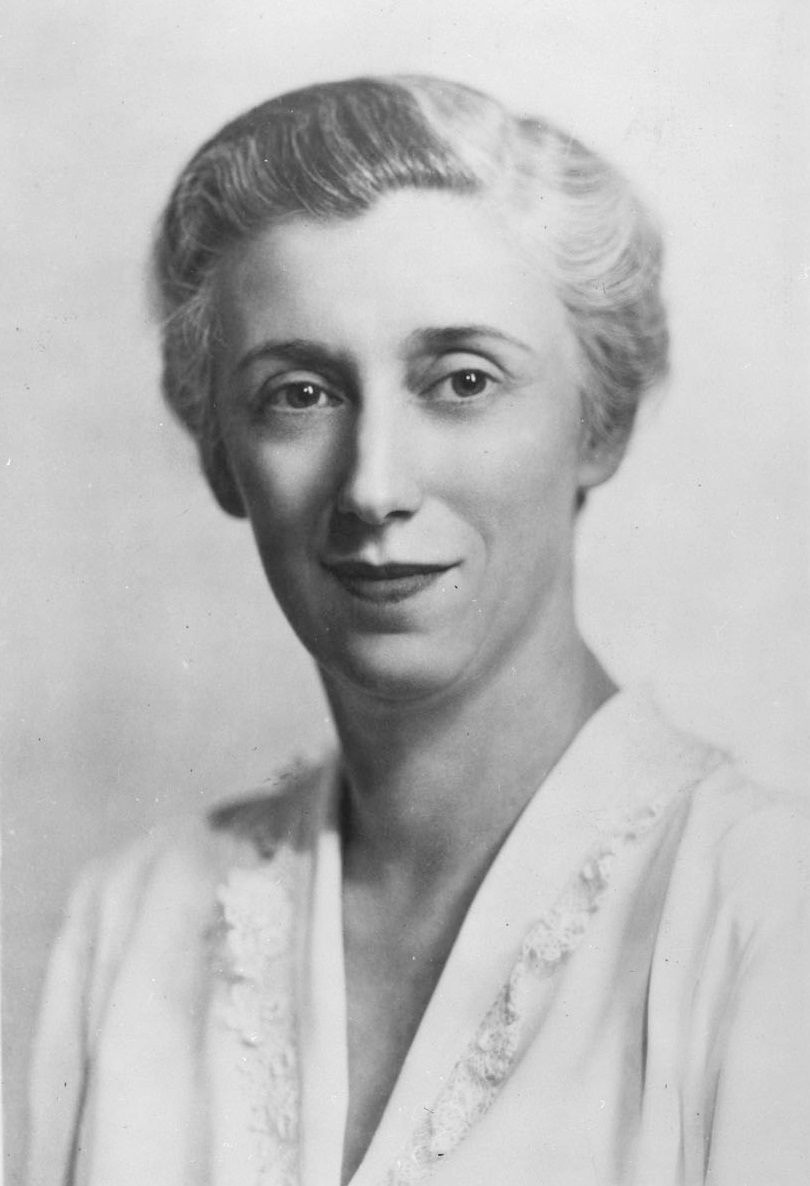
Mrs. Fairclough

- Ellen Fairclough, the first female cabinet minister in Canada (as Secretary of State for Canada), became the first woman to serve as the Acting Prime Minister, serving temporarily while Prime Minister Diefenbaker and 10 other cabinet ministers with more seniority were away from Ottawa campaigning for re-election.
- U.S. Senator Carl Hayden, who had served as the Senator for Arizona since its attainment of statehood in 1912, was honored by members of both parties for setting the new record— 46 years— for longest service in Congress. The 80-year-old Democrat, president pro tempore of the Senate, broke the record held by the late Joseph G. Cannon, Speaker of the House of Representatives.
- Born:
  - Leslie David Baker, American TV actor known for The Office; in Chicago
  - Helen Fielding, British writer known for creating the "Bridget Jones" series of books; in Morley, West Yorkshire

== February 20, 1958 (Thursday) ==
- The "Merlin Act" (officially "Law on the Abolition of the Regulation of Prostitution and the Fight Against the Exploitation of the Prostitution of Others", public law 75/1958) was signed into law by Italy's President Giovanni Gronchi. It was named after Angelina Merlin, the Italian Senator who had campaigned for it since 1948. The law, which took effect on September 20, ended the practice of state-approved houses of prostitution.
- Using Cuban Congressman Manuel de Jesus Leon as an intermediary, 26th of July Movement leader Fidel Castro sent word to President Fulgencio Batista of a proposal to end the Cuban Revolution on two conditions, starting with the withdrawal of the Cuban Army from the Oriente Province, followed by supervision by the Organization of American States of the scheduled June 1 general election to ensure fairness.
- A U.S. Navy radar plane and its 23-member crew disappeared over the North Atlantic Ocean a little more than 2 hours after takeoff. The Super Constellation plane had departed from Naval Station Argentia, a U.S. base in Canada's Newfoundland province.
- A test of the U.S. Air Force's new Atlas missile at Cape Canaveral failed slightly two minutes after its launch.
- The name of the NACA Committee on Aerodynamics was changed to Committee on Aircraft, Missile, and Spacecraft Aerodynamics to indicate clearly the committee's cognizance over problems applicable to spacecraft and missiles as well as aircraft. The Aerodynamics Committee had been studying spacecraft research problems for the past 6 years.
- Nathan Leopold, known for the 1924 random murder of a 14-year-old boy, was granted parole after more than 33 years in prison. He was 18 when he and another student at the University of Chicago, Richard Loeb, had been sentenced to life imprisonment plus 99 years for the kidnapping and thrill killing of Bobby Franks. A fellow inmate had murdered Loeb at the Stateville Correctional Center in Illinois in 1936. Leopold was released from the Illinois State Penitentiary on March 13.
- Died:
  - Thurston Hall, 75, American stage, film and television actor
  - Al Lichtman, 69, American film distributor and former president of the United Artists studio, known for proposing (to Famous Players studio producer Adolph Zukor) the concept of the feature film, a long-running movie rather than the one-reel films that had been the industry standard. The 69-minute feature The Count of Monte Cristo premiered on November 1, 1913, a year after Lichtman's departure.

== February 21, 1958 (Friday) ==
- Voters in separate referendums in Syria and Egypt approved the merger of the two nations into the United Arab Republic. According to official returns, "no" votes were cast by only 139 out of 1.3 million in Syria, and only 247 out of 6.1 million in Egypt. The other part of the referendum, approving Egypt's President Nasser as the UAR president, was approved by 1,312,808 out of 1,312,998 votes cast.
- Otto von Habsburg, who had been the crown prince of Austria-Hungary until 1918, and head of the House of Habsburg-Lorraine upon the death of his father Karl I, submitted a written statement to the Austrian government renouncing all privileges to which a member of the House of Habsburg was formerly entitled, but stopping short of renouncing his claims to the throne. On May 31, 1961, he would renounce all claims to the throne in order to become a private citizen of Austria, with citizenship granted on July 20, 1965.

The "peace sign"

- The peace symbol, a circle with four lines inside, was unveiled by its designer, Gerald Holtom, who had been hired by the Campaign for Nuclear Disarmament to prepare a logo in advance of an April 4 march from Trafalgar Square in London to the Atomic Weapons Research Establishment facility at Aldermaston, Berkshire.
- Born:
  - Mary Chapin Carpenter, American country music singer and songwriter, four-time Grammy Award winner; in Princeton, New Jersey
  - Jack Coleman, American TV actor; in Easton, Pennsylvania
  - Salvatore Cuffaro, governor of Sicily; in Raffadali
  - Alan Trammell, American baseball player, coach, and manger; in Garden Grove, California
- Died:
  - Henryk Arctowski, 86, Polish-born Belgian scientist who changed his surname from Artzt to Arctowski and participated in the Belgian Antarctic Expedition; in Warsaw
  - Duncan Edwards, 21, English soccer football left half for Manchester United, died from internal injuries sustained 15 days earlier in the crash of a plane carrying him and his team back to England.
  - Fred Pabst, 88, American brewer and co-founder of the Pabst Brewing Company.

== February 22, 1958 (Saturday) ==
- The United Arab Republic formally came into existence with the proclamation in Cairo by UAR President Nasser that "The United Arab Republic is now an accomplished fact," made in conjunction with the announcement of the results of the previous day's referendums.
- An agreement on placement of U.S. nuclear missiles at British RAF bases was made in Washington, D.C., in a meeting between the U.S. Under Secretary of State, Christian A. Herter, and the British Ambassador, Sir Harold Caccia. British Defence Minister Duncan Sandys announced the details to the House of Commons two days later and released the text of a joint memorandum. Under the terms of the pact, Royal Air Forces in eastern and northern England would receive intermediate range Thor missiles from the U.S., capable of striking Moscow, Leningrad and Odessa.
- The Bridge on the River Kwai and Les Girls won the prizes for best films at the 15th Golden Globe Awards.

== February 23, 1958 (Sunday) ==
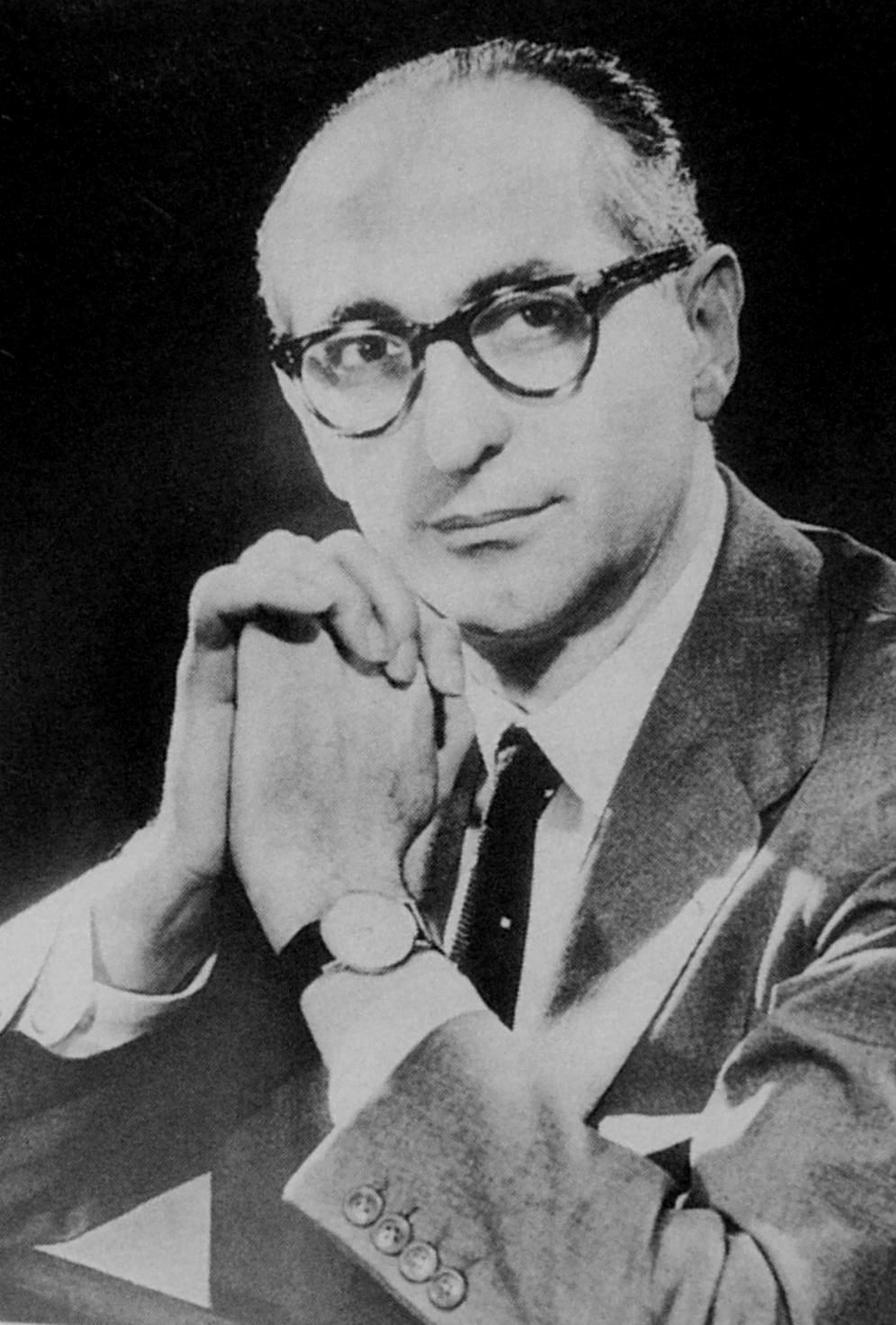
Frondizi

- In voting in Argentina, the first free election in the South American nation since 1928, Arturo Frondizi was elected President, defeating Ricardo Balbín with 49.49% of the total vote compared to Balbin's 31.83% in a race that saw a turnout of over 90% of the registered voters. Frondizi garnered a majority of the electoral votes (319 to 140). Voting took place for the 187-seat Chamber of Deputies, with Frondizi's UCRI Party winning 133 seats and Balbin's UCRP 52.

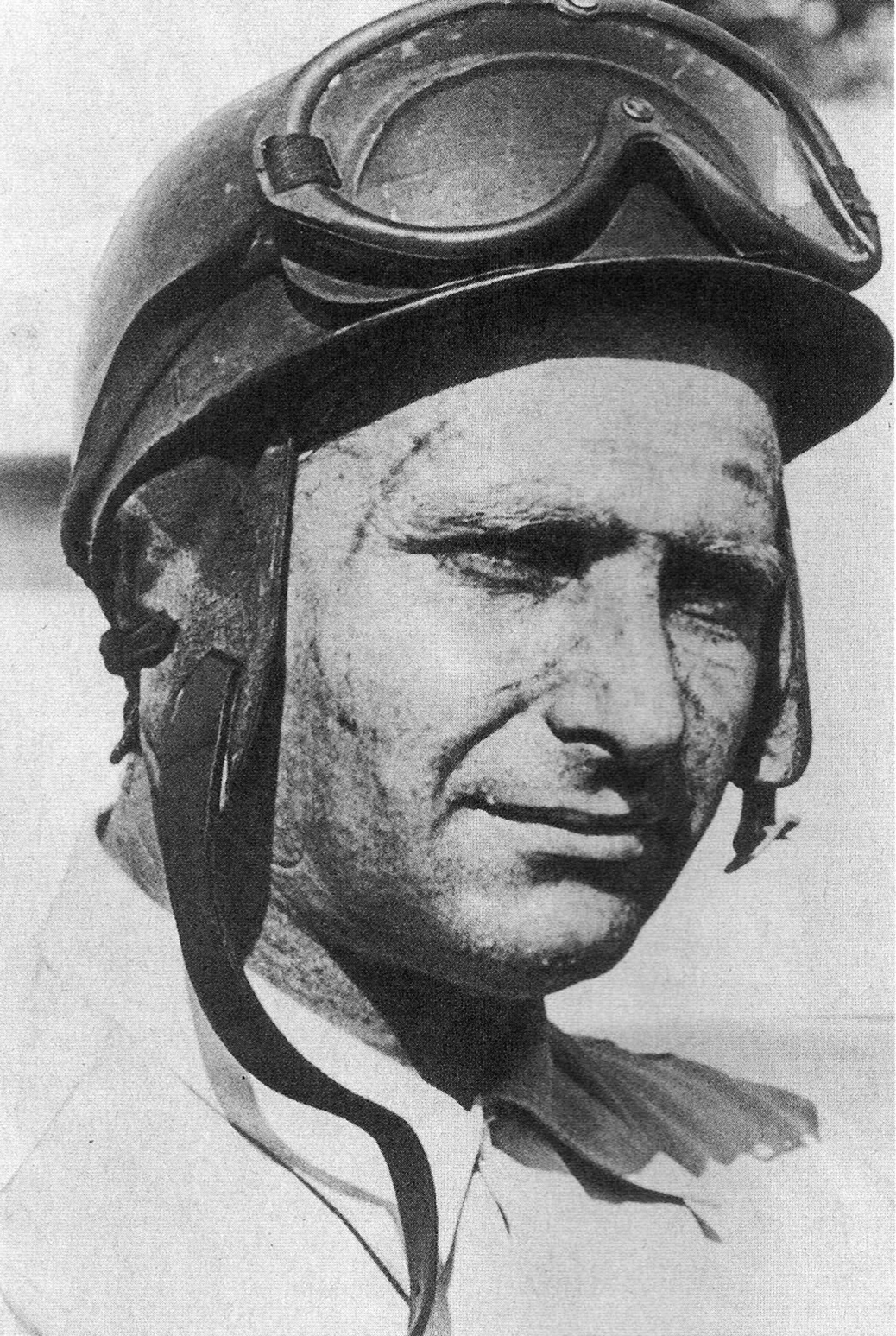
Fangio

- Rebels in Cuba entered the Hotel Lincoln in Havana and kidnapped five-time world driving champion Juan Manuel Fangio on the day that he was to compete in the Cuban Grand Prix (Gran Premio Cubana).
- Methyl alcohol poisoning that would eventually kill 23 people in New York City began with the serving of drinks, made of the basic component to rubbing alcohol, to guests at a party in a Puerto Rican neighborhood in East Harlem. The first six victims died on February 26, three days after consuming the poisonous liquid.
- Born:
  - Nazneen, Indian film actress; in Calcutta
  - David Sylvian, British singer; in Bromley
- Died: Dean Detton, 49, American pro wrestler and former world champion for 1936 and 1937, hanged himself.

== February 24, 1958 (Monday) ==
- The day after the kidnapping of Juan Manuel Fangio, the Cuban Gran Prix was conducted without him, albeit with a 90-minute delay "in the hope that Fangio would be released". After only five laps and 15 minutes driving, a car driven by Armando Garcia Cifuentes skidded on an oil slick (caused when the oil line on another racers' car burst) and crashed into the grandstand. Six spectators were killed and 31 injured. The race was halted, and the crowd of 150,000 was told to go home. Fangio was released, unharmed, shortly after midnight on Tuesday by the 26th of July Movement rebels.
- In Cuba, Fidel Castro's Radio Rebelde began broadcasting from Sierra Maestra.
- The U.S. Navy battleship USS Iowa was decommissioned and not used for more than 24 years, until its restoration and reactivation in 1984. After its gun turret exploded in 1989 in an accident killing 47 sailors, the ship was decommissioned permanently in 1990.

== February 25, 1958 (Tuesday) ==
- Egyptian troops invaded Sudan, traveling for 130 kilometres (81 mi) southward to the city of Abu Hamad, before retreating. Ethiopian emperor Haile Selassie offered to mediate between the two states.
- Bertrand Russell launched the Campaign for Nuclear Disarmament.

== February 26, 1958 (Wednesday) ==
- U.S. President Dwight D. Eisenhower revealed at a press conference that he and his vice president, Richard M. Nixon, had a "clear understanding" of "exactly what he should do in the event of a presidential disability" that would include Nixon becoming "Acting President" if Eisenhower were too ill to declare his own disability. The statement came in response to a question by reporter Felix Blair of The New York Times. Under questioning from the press about whether the plan had been put in writing, the White House released the details of the plan on March 3, specifying that if President Eisenhower told Vice President Nixon of his inability to act, Nixon would "become Acting President and to assume the powers of duties of the office until the inability had ended" and that if Eisenhower were unable to communicate, Nixon would make the determination after consultation "as seems to him appropriate under the circumstances." Eisenhower himself "would determine when the inability had ended" in order to resume office. The problem would eventually be resolved by ratification of the Twenty-fifth Amendment to the United States Constitution in 1967.
- The town of Woodway, Washington, was incorporated as a wealthy suburb of Edmonds, Washington.
- Born:
  - U.S. Air Force Lieutenant General Susan Helms, American astronaut on six space missions; in Charlotte, North Carolina
  - Nestor Tan, Philippine banker and Unibank CEO; in Manila
- Died: Frederick M. Dearborn Jr., 45, special assistant to U.S. President Eisenhower on coordination of national security operations, was found dead in his home in Washington. President Eisenhower ordered the flag to be flown at half-staff at all federal buildings in Washington and in Dearborn's home state of Massachusetts.

== February 27, 1958 (Thursday) ==
- Voting began in elections for the 173-seat Sudanese House of Representatives and 30 of the 50 seats in the African nation's Senate. Voting lasted until March 8.
- In Italy, the reintroduction of a state examination as a prerequisite for graduation from a university resulted in violent protests from students, including the disruption of a lecture by former Prime Minister Antonio Segni at the University of Rome.
- In Milan, seven robbers stole 100 million lira in cash and 600 million in negotiable instruments from a Banca Popolare di Milano armored car, moving quickly and without firing a shot. The crime received extensive coverage in the Italian press. Most of the gang was arrested on April 1.
- France instituted mandatory liability insurance for motor vehicles with the enactment of Law No. 58-208.
- Thirty-five people out of 42 were killed in the crash of a Silver City Airways chartered Bristol Freighter airplane in England as it was attempting to land in Manchester after takeoff from the Isle of Man. The passengers were automobile dealers on a one-day trip to inspect the Exide Battery Works in Manchester.
- Experience with the X-15 design indicated that many of the weight figures advanced by the Langley Aeronautical Laboratory for the drag or lift configurations of the reentry vehicle (later to become the Mercury spacecraft) were too low, according to Walter C. Williams, Chief of the NACA High-Speed Flight Station. Weights of auxiliary-power fuel, research instrumentation, and cockpit equipment as set by Langley were too low in terms of X-15 experience. Williams stated the total weight should be 2,300 pounds (1,000 kg) for the drag configuration and 2,500 pounds (1,100 kg) for the lifting configuration.
- Born:
  - Maggie Hassan, U.S. Senator for and former Governor of New Hampshire; in Boston, Massachusetts
  - Nancy Spungen, American murder victim; in Philadelphia. Her boyfriend, punk rock musician Sid Vicious (John Simon Ritchie), was charged with stabbing her but died before a trial could be held. (d. 1978)
- Died: Harry Cohn, 64, American film executive and president of Columbia Pictures

== February 28, 1958 (Friday) ==
- Twenty-six students on the way to school, and their driver, were killed in Floyd County, Kentucky, when their bus ran off the road and slid down a hill into a flooded river in the worst school bus disaster in American history. Another 16 students survived by escaping through the emergency exit at the rear of the bus or out of a window.
- Born: Natalya Estemirova, Russian journalist and activist; in Sverdlovsk Oblast (killed 2009)
