= January 1958 =

Month of 1958

<<	January 1958					>>
Su	Mo	Tu	We	Th	Fr	Sa
			1	2	3	4
5	6	7	8	9	10	11
12	13	14	15	16	17	18
19	20	21	22	23	24	25
26	27	28	29	30	31

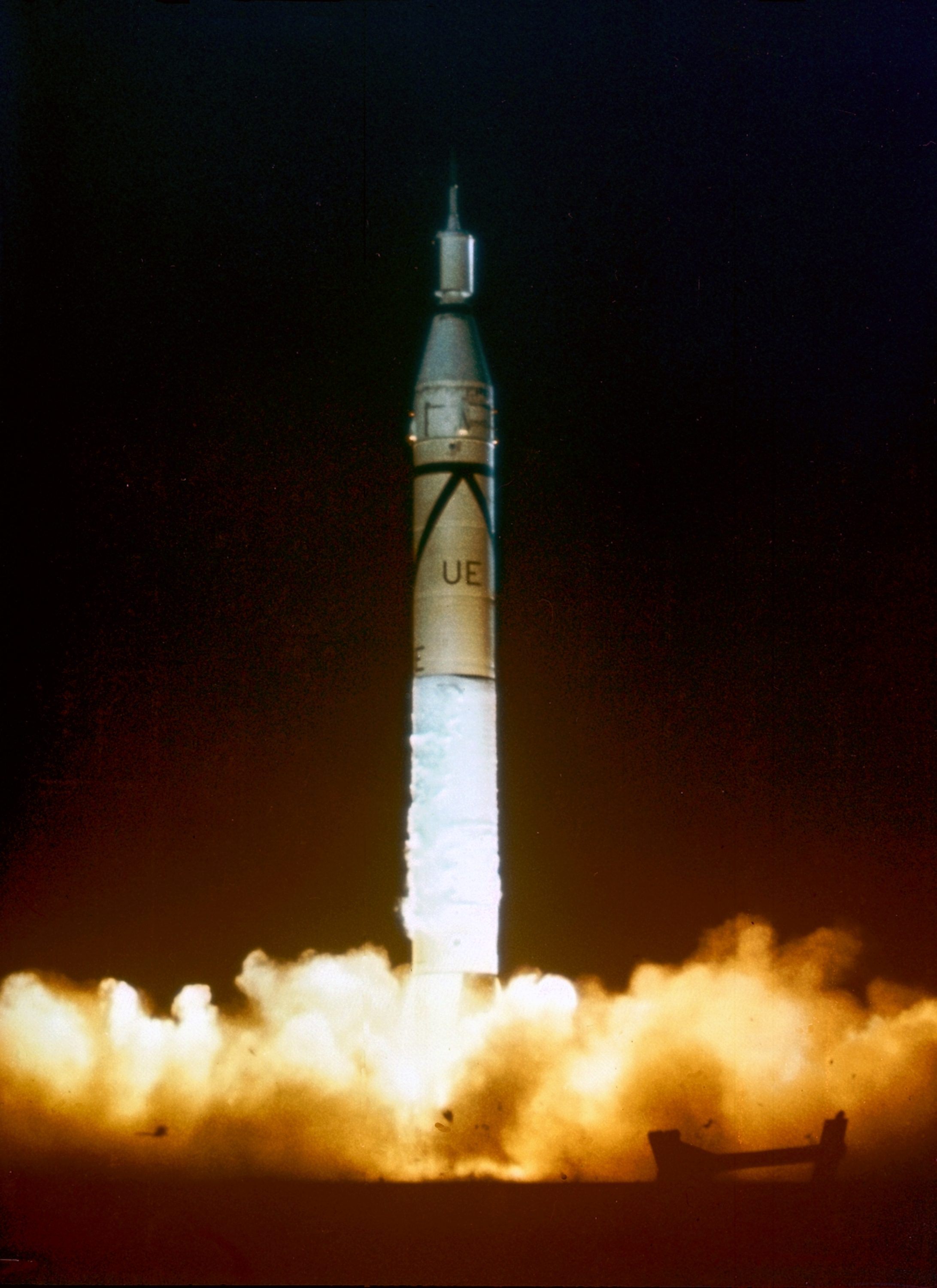
January 31, 1958: U.S. launches its first orbiting object, Explorer-1

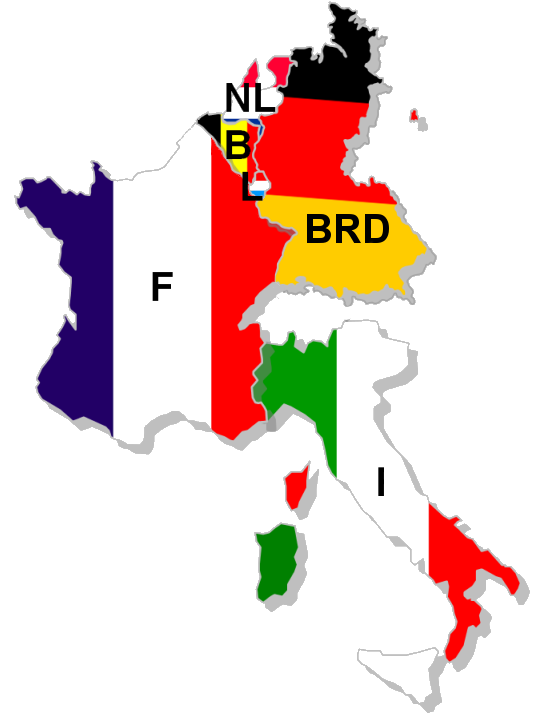
January 1, 1958: European Economic Community formed by Belgium, Netherlands, Luxembourg, France, West Germany and Italy

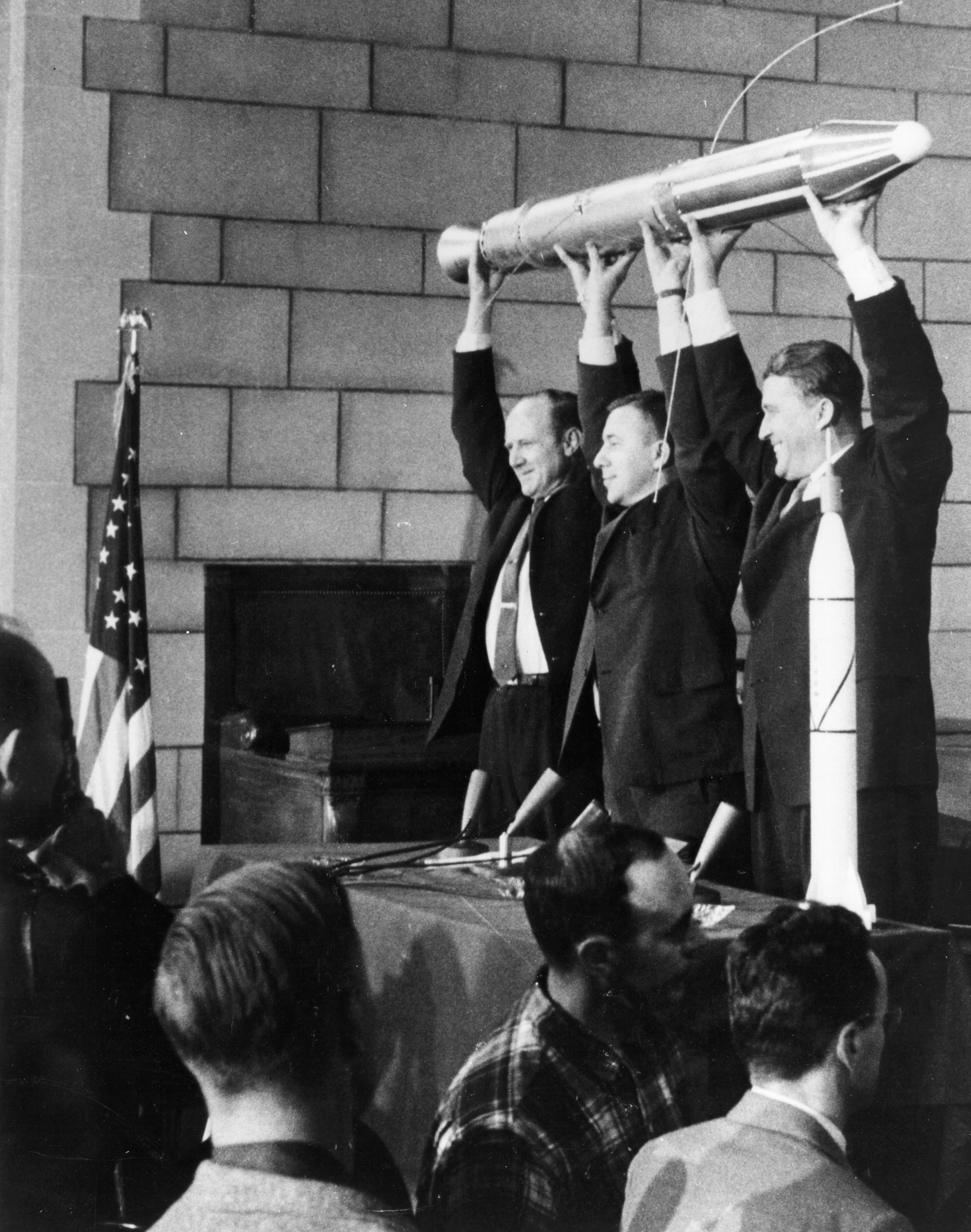
A full-scale replica of Explorer 1, held by William Pickering, James Van Allen, and Wernher von Braun

The following events occurred in January 1958:

== January 1, 1958 (Wednesday) ==
New Year's festivities in New York City on January 1, 1958

- King Bhumibol Adulyadej named Lieutenant General Thanom Kittikachorn of the Army of Thailand as Thailand's new Prime Minister. General Kittikachorn retained his post as Defense Minister.
- The Asian-African Peoples Solidarity Conference, with 500 delegates, closed after having met for one week in Cairo, where the participants were guests of Egypt's President Gamel Abdel Nasser.
- The European Economic Community (EEC), more commonly called "the Common Market", came into being as an economic and cooperative union between Belgium, France, Italy, Luxembourg, the Netherlands, and West Germany. The founding was put into effect by the Treaty of Rome, which had been signed on March 25, 1957.
- The Ohio State Buckeyes, ranked number one college football team in the final coaches poll by United Press International in the 1957 season, defeated the Oregon Ducks, 10 to 7, in the Rose Bowl before a crowd of over 98,000 in Pasadena, California. Auburn University, though ranked number one in the Associated Press poll of writers, and unbeaten (10–0–0), was suspended from postseason competition by the NCAA and was not ranked by the coaches' poll.
- Born: Grandmaster Flash (stage name for Joseph Saddler), Barbados-born American hip-hop music recording artist and Rock and Roll Hall of Fame inductee; in Bridgetown, Barbados
- Died:
  - William T. Bovie, 75, American biophysicist and inventor who developed the Bovie electrosurgical generator or "electric scalpel" that prevented bleeding in brain surgery.
  - Lieutenant Colonel Douglas Kelley, 45, chief psychiatrist at Nuremberg Prison during the Nuremberg War Trials in 1946, committed suicide at his home in Berkeley, California, by ingesting potassium cyanide in the same manner as Nazi leader Hermann Göring had done at Nuremberg.
  - Edward Weston, 71, innovative American nature photographer nicknamed the "Rembrandt of the Lens".

== January 2, 1958 (Thursday) ==
- The Communist government of the Soviet Union, which controlled wages and prices, announced that the price of vodka and wine would increase immediately by as much as 20 percent, while the price of an automobile went up by as much as 50 percent, which a reporter for The New York Times noted "will affect relatively few Russians." To offset discontent, the price of bread was lowered slightly.
- Opera star Maria Callas, the prima donna of the Rome Opera, halted singing at the end of the first act of the Vincenzo Bellini opera Norma, the opener of the new season at Teatro dell'Opera di Roma, and refused to come back onstage for the second act. There was no understudy to complete the role; Italy's President Giovanni Gronchi and his wife walked out, and the rest of the performance was canceled as members of the audience began fighting. The opener was being broadcast to millions of radio listeners on the Italian State Broadcasting Network at the time.
- The new four-lane Connecticut Turnpike opened for traffic at 2:30 in the afternoon. The total tolls for driving the 129 miles (208 km) highway from Greenwich to Killingly were $2.10, equivalent to more than $18 60 years later.
- Born: Vladimir Ovchinnikov, Russian-born pianist and member of the Moscow Philharmonic Orchestra, 1982 winner of the International Tchaikovsky Competition; in Belebey, Bashkir ASSR, Soviet Union (now Bashkortostan Republic, Russia)

== January 3, 1958 (Friday) ==
- Edmund Hillary's Commonwealth Trans-Antarctic Expedition completed the first overland journey to the South Pole in more than 46 years, the first to use motorized vehicles, and the third (after the parties of Roald Amundsen in October and Robert Falcon Scott in November 1911) trip to the South Pole overall.
- The West Indies Federation was formed. Patrick Buchan-Hepburn, 1st Baron Hailes was sworn in as the first Governor-General at the Federation's capital in Port of Spain (on the island of Trinidad at 10:25 in the morning. The self-governing Federation, was composed of Trinidad and Tobago, Jamaica, Barbados, Saint Lucia, Saint Vincent, Grenada, Montserrat, Saint Kitts and Nevis (at the time St Kitts-Nevis-Anguilla), Dominica, Antigua, and Montserrat. A prime minister would take office until April 18, when Grantley Herbert Adams became the first and only holder of the office.
- General Luo Ruiqing, the Minister of Public Security for the People's Republic of China, announced in an article in the party journal Study, that more than 100,000 persons had been classified as "counter-revolutionaries" and "rightists" by the nation's ruling Communist Party in an investigation of 1,770,000 people that had been conducted from June 1955 to October 1957. In his feature, he said that at least 5,000 of the people were Communist Party members and that 3,000 had been found in the Communist Youth League. The announcement found a month later when a copy of the journal arrived in Hong Kong, came after the start of the "rectification" campaign by Party Chairman Mao Zedong and before a purge of cabinet ministers labeled as "non-Communists", including Communications Minister Chang Po-chun and Food Minister Chang Nai-chi, and 57 party members dismissed by the National People's Congress

== January 4, 1958 (Saturday) ==
- Sputnik 1, which had been launched three months earlier on October 4, 1957, as the first man-made satellite in history, fell out of orbit and burned up upon re-entry into Earth's atmosphere.
- The American Rocket Society and the Rocket and Satellite Research Panel issued a summary of their proposals for a National Space Establishment. The consensus was that the new agency should be independent of the United States Department of Defense and not, in any event, under one of the military services.
- Born:
  - Matt Frewer, American-born Canadian TV and film actor known for portraying the title role in the TV show Max Headroom; in Washington, D.C.
  - Ahuti Prasad, Indian actor in the Telugu film industry (died of cancer, 2015)
- Died: Archie Alexander, 59, African-American designer and Governor of the U.S. Virgin Islands from 1954 to 1955

== January 5, 1958 (Sunday) ==
- The paramilitary group BAJARAKA was founded in South Vietnam to fight against persecution against the Montagnards, a minority ethnic group living in the hills of Vietnam, and organized by a Montagnard, Y Bham Enoul.
- The broadcast of a science fiction drama on Radio Moscow was mistaken by Western listening posts as a news report that the Soviets had launched the first man into outer space. Although the radio play opened with a statement of something that might happen "in the not too distant future" and closed with the narrator saying "of course, so far no actual flight of a man in the cosmic ship has taken place", rumors began circulating the next day that the Russians had launched a manned rocket to an altitude 300 kilometres (190 mi) above Earth. The first launch of a man into space would take place from the Soviet Union three years later.
- The Soviet Union announced that the number of delegates in both houses of its parliament, the Supreme Soviet, would be increased because of the population increase nationwide. The Council of the Union increased its number from 700 to 731, while the Council of Nationalities went from 600 to 633.
- Bellevue Baptist Church, now a megachurch in Memphis, Tennessee, became the first church in history to televise its services live using its own equipment.

== January 6, 1958 (Monday) ==
- Five Americans were allowed by the People's Republic of China to become the first visitors since 1949 to be invited to the Communist nation. Four had asked permission to visit relatives who were imprisoned in China, and crossed the border at Hong Kong, while the other person, A. L. Wirin, was a defense attorney seeking to gather information for his clients, who were awaiting trial on charges of espionage in the U.S. Mrs. Mary V. Downey and her son William were visiting her son John T. Downey; Mrs. Ruth Redmond was visiting her son Hugh Francis Redmond; and Mrs. Philip G. Fectau was present to visit her son Richard Fecteau, who was captured along with Downey and serving a 20-year sentence and would be released on December 13, 1971. Mr. Downey and Mr. Redmond had been sentenced to life imprisonment. On January 9, the mothers were allowed to spend two hours with their sons, with Mrs. Redmond going to Shanghai and Mrs. Downey and Mrs. Fecteau meeting with their sons at the Tsao Lan-tze Prison in Beijing. All three men were CIA agents; Fecteau would be set free in 1971 and Downey would remain until 1973 after more than 20 years' incarceration, while Redmond would die in prison in 1970.
- A U.S. Navy Mercator patrol bomber with 12 crew crashed into a neighborhood in Norfolk, Virginia, when its engines failed during its approach to the Norfolk Naval Air Station. Four of the servicemen on the plane were killed, and although three cottages at the intersection of 22nd Bay and East Ocean View Avenue were destroyed, the occupants sustained only minor injuries.
- The television game show Dotto, hosted by Jack Narz, premiered on the CBS television network in the United States with a premise of a general knowledge quiz and "connect the dots". The show, along with its prime time version which premiered on the rival NBC network in July 1, was abruptly canceled after its last episode on August 15. Soon afterward, Dotto was among the shows identified as providing answers in advance to some of the contestants.
- Born:
  - Themos Anastasiadis, Greek newspaper publisher and founder of the Sunday paper Proto Thema (d. 2019 from cancer)
  - Gulab Chandio, Pakistani television and film actor; in Shahmir Chandio, Sindh province (d. 2019 from heart disease)

== January 7, 1958 (Tuesday) ==
- Meeting in Paris, the foreign ministers of the six member nations of the new European Economic Community approved West Germany's Walter Hallstein as the first President of the European Commission that served as the executive committee of the EEC, and engineer Louis Armand of France as chairman of the European Atomic Energy Community. The ministers could not agree on the site of a headquarters, although Brussels (Belgium), Luxembourg City and Strasbourg (France) were all under consideration.
- Died:
  - Petru Groza, 73, Romanian politician, Prime Minister of Romania from 1945 to 1952, later the Head of the State as President of the Presidium of the Great National Assembly.
  - Margaret Anglin, 81, Canadian stage actress and leading lady on Broadway in the late 19th and early 20th century

== January 8, 1958 (Wednesday) ==
- Sheikh Abdullah, nicknamed "The Lion of Kashmir" and Dewan of the Princely State of Jammu and Kashmir from the time of India's independence until his arrest in 1953 on charges of conspiracy, was freed from house arrest at the village of Kud after more than four years, and would return to politics in the union territory. His freedom would last only seven months, and he would be returned to jail until 1964 after having been accused of sedition along with 23 Kashmiris in an action that known as the Kashmir Conspiracy Case.
- Born: Betsy DeVos, U.S. Secretary of Education 2017 to 2021; in Holland, Michigan
- Died:
  - Mary Colter, 88, American architect
  - Paul Pilgrim, 74, American track athlete and Olympic gold medalist in 1904 and 1906.

== January 9, 1958 (Thursday) ==
- Saboteurs with Algeria's National Liberation Front used a delayed mine to destroy the railway line upon which the first petroleum from the Hassi Messaoud oil field near Touggourt in the Sahara desert had been scheduled to be shipped to the port at Philippeville (now Skikda) for shipment to France. The mine, planted on the rails near Condé-Smendou exploded a few minutes after a freight train unexpectedly passed over it, a day ahead of when the oil shipment was to pass thorough the same area.
- In the annual State of the Union address, U.S. President Dwight D. Eisenhower outlined an eight-point proposal to prevent what he described as a future that "would hold nothing for the world but an Age of Terror." Referring to the October 31, 1957, launch of Sputnik 1 by the Soviet Union, Eisenhower conceded that "Most of us did not anticipate the intensity upon the world of the launching of the first earth satellite," and that "we are probably somewhat behind the Soviets in some areas" in development of long-range missiles.
- Novosibirsk State University was authorized by resolution of the Council of Ministers of the Soviet Union as the largest university in Siberia. The first classes would begin on September 28, 1959.
- Martin Sandberger, whose original sentence for his role in genocide in Latvia, Lithuania and Estonia as an Einsatzgruppen official had been death by hanging, and later commuted to life imprisonment, was released from Landsberg prison after a little more than 12 years of incarceration. He would live peacefully in West Germany until his death in 2010 at the age of 98.
- Born: Mehmet Ali Agca, Turkish terrorist who shot and wounded Pope John Paul II in a 1981 assassination attempt; in Hekimhan
- Died: Elmer "Trigger" Burke, 40, American bank robber and contract killer, was executed in the electric chair at Sing Sing Prison in Ossining, New York.

== January 10, 1958 (Friday) ==
- In a speech to the Chinese Communist Party's Central Committee, China's Prime Minister Zhou Enlai reported that China was abandoning further plans to adapt a Chinese-symbol based phonetic alphabet for the Chinese language and that, "In the future, we shall adopt the Latin alphabet for the Chinese phonetic alphabet. Being in wide use in scientific and technological fields and in constant day-to-day usage, it will be easily remembered. The adoption of such an alphabet will, therefore, greatly facilitate the popularization of the common speech." The People's Republic would settle on the Hanyu Pinyin system of 23 consonant prefixes and 24 vowel/consonant suffixes in a law approved by the National People's Congress a month later on February 11.
- A steam catapult explosion aboard the aircraft carrier USS Kearsarge (CV-33) killed two sailors and injured three others.
- The fourth Atlas fired from Cape Canaveral made a successful limited flight.
- Born: Samira Said, Moroccan-born Egyptian singer; in Rabat

== January 11, 1958 (Saturday) ==
- Without prior approval or notice to Syria's President Shukri al-Quwatli, Syrian Army Chief of Staff Afif al-Bizri traveled to Egypt with a delegation of officers and met with Egyptian President Gamel Abdel Nasser to discuss unity between the two nations.
- Romania's Grand National Assembly elected Foreign Minister Ion Gheorghe Maurer as the new President of the Presidium, Romania's Head of State, to succeed Petru Groza.
- The Communist government of Albania released a U.S. Air Force pilot whose T-33 training aircraft had been forced down on December 23 after penetrating Albanian airspace. Major Howard J. Curran was flown from Tirana as the sole passenger of a Yugoslavian airliner that landed in Belgrade. The Albanians kept the T-33. Major Curran had been listed as missing for 15 days until the Albanian government announced that he was alive and been captured upon landing at Berat. The release followed the freeing on January 4 of a British cargo plane and its six crew that had been forced to land at Vlorë on December 31.
- French Army troops battled with Algerian nationalists who had crossed 2 miles (3.2 km) from Tunisia into French Algeria from Sakiet Sidi Youssef. France reported that 12 of its soldiers were killed in the attack. The attack came one day after a clash near the Algerian border town of El Taref, where 116 nationalists had been killed by France, which lost only two men.
- Died: Frank Willard, 64, American cartoonist who had created the comic strip Moon Mullins that debuted on June 19, 1923. While the strip was primarily done by his assistant, Ferd Johnson, Willard's name remained on the byline. Johnson would continue the strip after Willard's death until his retirement on June 2, 1991.

== January 12, 1958 (Sunday) ==
- At Nanning, the capital of the Guangxi province, China's leader Mao Zedong announced his plans for the "Great Leap Forward", a five-year economic and social plan to revise agricultural production in the People's Republic of China by the relocation of farmers into "people's communes" in order to increase the amount of food produced. The Great Leap Forward would prove to be a disaster that saw a decrease in the amount of food available and a famine that killed millions of people between 1958 and 1962 to the extent that, based on population data collected from various researchers, "estimates range from 15 to 32 million excess deaths." On January 31, Mao introduced a document that would outline his vision for the leap forward.
- The government of Poland issued a deterrent, though not an outright ban, for citizens who wished to go out of the country. Effective January 18, each person seeking to travel to the West was required to pay Zł 5,000 zlotys (equivalent to US$209 at the time) based on a Zł 2,000 exit fee, in addition to Zł 3,000 for a passport good for a single trip, and Zł 1,500 if the traveler was making a second trip abroad.
- In the Spanish Sahara in Africa, the Saharan Liberation Army, organized from nationalists from Morocco, attacked the Spanish garrison at the largest city in the Spanish colony, El Aaiún, and was forced to retreat. The next day, the Moroccan and Saharan force ambushed two companies of Spain's 13th Legionnaire battalion, which sustained heavy losses. The result was a massive intervention by the armies of France and Spain the next month to break up the rebellion.
- A conflict between the South American nations of Chile and Argentina began over the uninhabitable island Snipe, located in the Beagle Channel waterway and claimed by both countries. The Chilean Navy vessel Micalvi brought a crew and equipment to erect a lighthouse. Argentina, claiming the island as its territory, demanded a withdrawal and, in April, would destroy the Chilean structure and replace it with an Argentine lighthouse. The situation escalated from there.
- President Eisenhower, answering a December 10, 1957, letter from Soviet Premier Nikolai Bulganin regarding a summit conference on disarmament, proposed that Russia and the United States ". . . agree that outer space should be used for peaceful purposes." This proposal was compared to dedicating atomic energy to peaceful uses, an offer which the Soviets rejected.
- The two-point conversion in football was approved for college football in the U.S. by an 11 to 0 vote by the NCAA Rules Committee, meeting at Fort Lauderdale, Florida. One of the committee members, athletic director Fritz Crisler of the University of Michigan, commented after the meeting in Fort Lauderdale, "It's a progressive step which will make football more interesting for the spectators," adding that the rule "will add drama to what has been the dullest, most stupid play in the game."
- Born: Christiane Amanpour, British-born Iranian journalist and television host for CNN and PBS; in Ealing, Middlesex

== January 13, 1958 (Monday) ==
- Colleen Lake, a freshwater lake located on the continent of Antarctica, was first discovered by U.S. geologist Troy L. Pewe.
- In South Africa, Attorney General W. J. McKenzie dropped charges against 61 of the 156 defendants indicted for treason in 1956 and released them, the most prominent being Albert Luthuli.

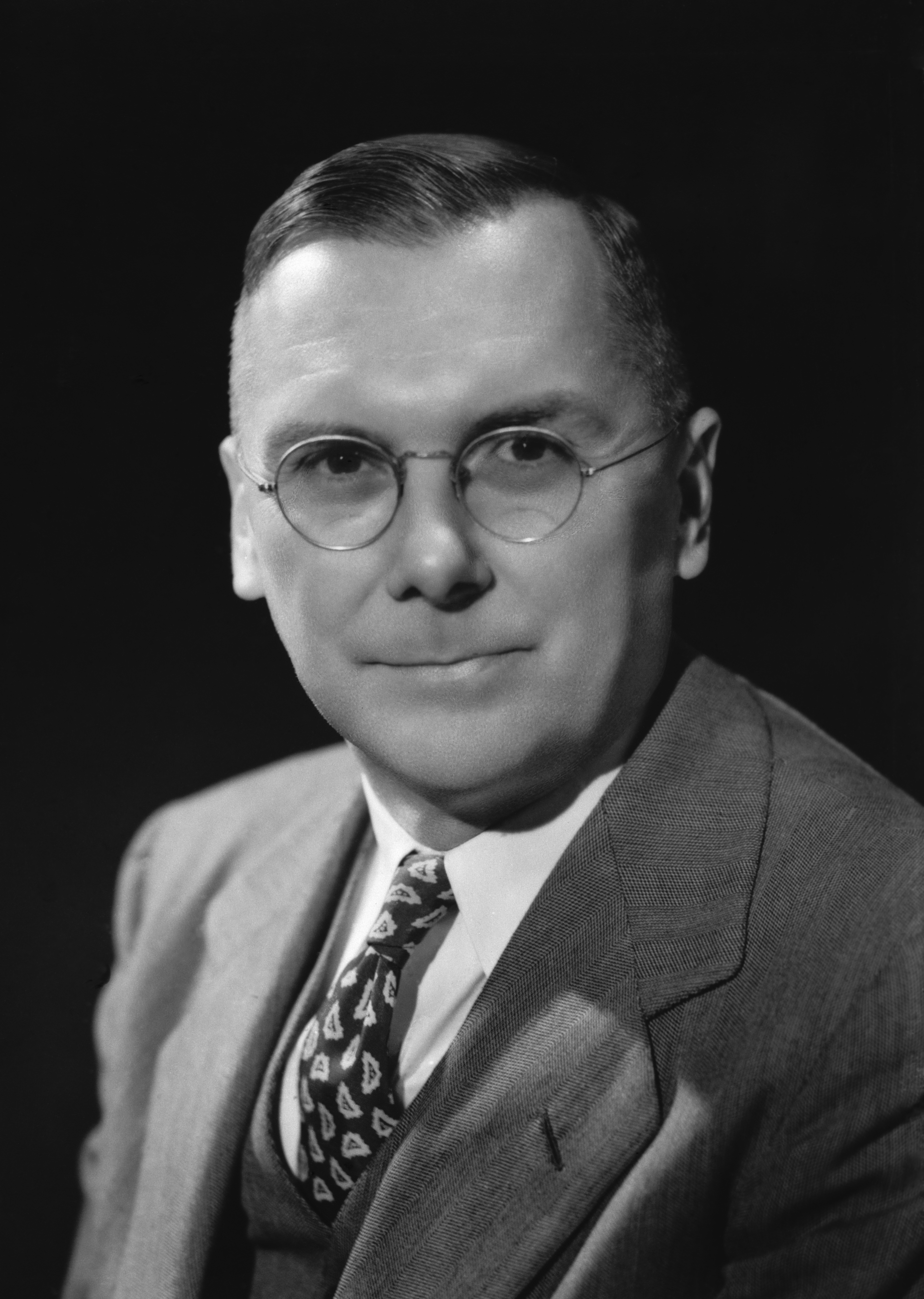
Dryden

- Hugh Dryden, director of the National Advisory Committee for Aeronautics (NACA), published his proposal, "A National Research Program for Space Technology", acknowledging the fear in the U.S. from the Soviet launch into orbit of Sputnik 1, and commenting, "It is of great urgency and importance to our country both from consideration of our prestige as a nation as well as military necessity that this challenge [Sputnik] be met by an energetic program of research and development for the conquest of space ... It is accordingly proposed that the scientific research be the responsibility of a national civilian agency ... NACA is capable, by rapid extension and expansion of its effort, of providing leadership in space technology." The National Aeronautics and Space Administration (NASA) would be formed on July 29, 1958.

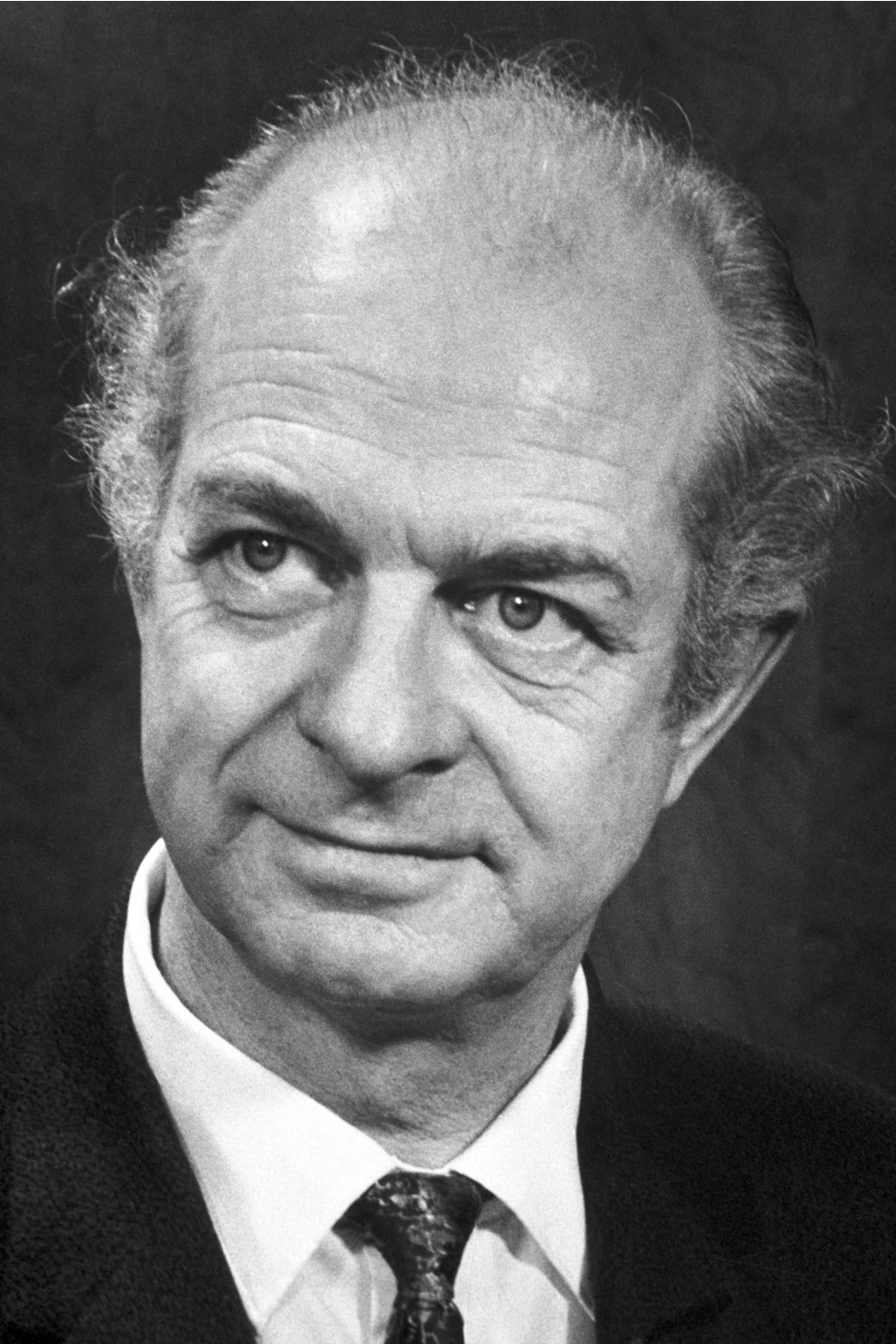
Pauling

- Dr. Linus Pauling presented a petition to ask for a worldwide halt to all nuclear testing, signed by 9,235 scientists from 43 world nations, to United Nations Secretary-General Dag Hammarskjöld. Dr. Pauling, who won the Nobel Prize in Chemistry in 1954, was one of 37 Nobel laureates to sign. The signers included 216 members of the Academy of Sciences of the Soviet Union, 101 from the National Academy of Sciences (NAS) in the U.S., and 35 fellows of the Royal Society in the UK.
- The U.S. announced its decision to establish the first Ballistic Missile Early Warning System (BMEWS) radar station. The first station would become fully operative in 1961 at Thule Air Base in Greenland.
- After a split in the Communist Party USA that caused many members to resign their membership, the CPUSA ended publication of its seven-day-a-week newspaper, the Daily Worker. The American communist organization would publish a bi-weekly paper, before resuming daily publication in 1968 with the Soviet-funded periodical, The Daily World. The final headline was "We'll Be Back! Fighting for Peace, Democracy and Socialism."
- At the Metropolitan Opera in New York, conductor Pietro Cimara suffered a stroke and toppled from his podium shortly after starting the second scene of Giuseppe Verdi's La Forza del Destino. Violinist Walter Hagen came out of the orchestra and continued conducting the score, working from memory, without interruption. Hagen conducted for the remaining eight minutes of the scene and then was replaced by former conductor Kurt Adler.
- Died:
  - Jesse L. Lasky, 77, American film producer who founded Lasky Feature Play Company, later Famous Players–Lasky Corporation, which became Paramount Pictures.
  - Edna Purviance, 62, American silent film actress known for being the leading lady in many of Charlie Chaplin's film productions

== January 14, 1958 (Tuesday) ==
- Television Wales and the West (TWW), an affiliate of ITV, began broadcasting on Channel 10 from Cardiff in the United Kingdom at 4:45 in the afternoon, with an opening ceremony by the station's chairman, John Stanley, 18th Earl of Derby, programming director Ifan ab Owen Edwards, and Alfred Francis. At 5:00, announcer Bruce Lewis introduced the ITV program Youth Wants to Know.
- The autocratic government of Spain decreed that its colony of Spanish West Africa would be converted into two provinces of Spain, Ifni and the Spanish Sahara, to be governed by Governors-General.
- Peter Anthony Manuel, an American-born resident of Scotland, was arrested by police in Glasgow and charged with the January 1 murders of a couple and their son, and soon linked to four other murders. Manuel would be convicted on May 29 for the murders of the seven victims and hanged at Barlinnie Prison on July 11, 1958.

== January 15, 1958 (Wednesday) ==
- Challenge Records released the popular instrumental (with the exception of one word) song "Tequila", written by Daniel Flores and recorded by The Champs. Initially marketed as the B-side of a 45-rpm recording of a song called "Train to Nowhere", "Tequila" would quickly become the best-selling song in the United States after being played by a disk jockey in Cleveland, reaching the number one spot on Billboard magazine's Hot-100 chart for the week ending March 28.
- The U.S. Air Force received 11 unsolicited industry proposals for Project 7969, entitled "Manned Ballistic Rocket Research System," with a stated task of recovering a crewed capsule from orbital conditions, and technical evaluation was started. Observers from NACA participated.
- The American opera Vanessa, written by Samuel Barber, was given its first performance, making its debut at the Metropolitan Opera in New York City.
- Born: Boris Tadić, President of Serbia from 2004 to 2012; in Sarajevo, Bosnia-Herzegovina, Yugoslavia.
- Died: Baba Raghav Das, 61, Indian social reformer and independence activist.

== January 16, 1958 (Thursday) ==
- The European Commission, the 9-member executive board of the European Economic Community (or Common Market), held its first official session. Gathering in Belgium at the Château of Val-Duchesse in Auderghem, near Brussels, the commission's meeting was opened by its president, Walter Hallstein.
- Paul E. Purser and Maxime A. Faget conceived of a solid-fuel launch vehicle design for the research and development phase of a crewed satellite vehicle project. This launch vehicle was later designated Little Joe. When Project Mercury began in October 1958, the purpose of the Little Joe phase was to propel a full-scale, full-weight developmental version of the crewed spacecraft to some of the flight conditions that would be encountered during exit from the atmosphere on an orbital mission. Also, Little Joe tests were used to perfect the escape maneuver in the event of an aborted mission.
- Former Canadian foreign minister Lester B. Pearson was overwhelmingly elected to be the new leader of the Liberal Party of Canada by delegates to the party's national convention, defeating former health minister Paul Martin by a margin of 1,074 to 305. Pearson would become prime minister in 1963.
- The popular play Two for the Seesaw made its debut, appearing on Broadway at the Booth Theatre for the first of 750 performances. Written by William Gibson, the production starred Henry Fonda and Anne Bancroft.
- Born: Wayne Bergeron, A famous American Jazz Trumpet player who is famous for playing with bands such as Gordon Goodwin's Big Phat Band. L. Timothy Ryan, American chef and president of The Culinary Institute of America since 2001; in Pittsburgh
- Died: Aubrey Mather, 72, English character actor in film

== January 17, 1958 (Friday) ==
- Television was inaugurated in the South American nation of Peru as TV Perú began broadcasting from Lima on Channel 7 as a state-owned service of the Department of Education. Commercial television would begin on December 15 with the launch of Canal 4 Radio América.
- The first nuclear reactor in South America, Reactor Atómica 1 (RA-1) at San Martin, a suburb of Buenos Aires in Argentina, attained critical mass. The reactor was regulated by the Argentina's Comisión Nacional de Energía Atómica (CNEA).

== January 18, 1958 (Saturday) ==
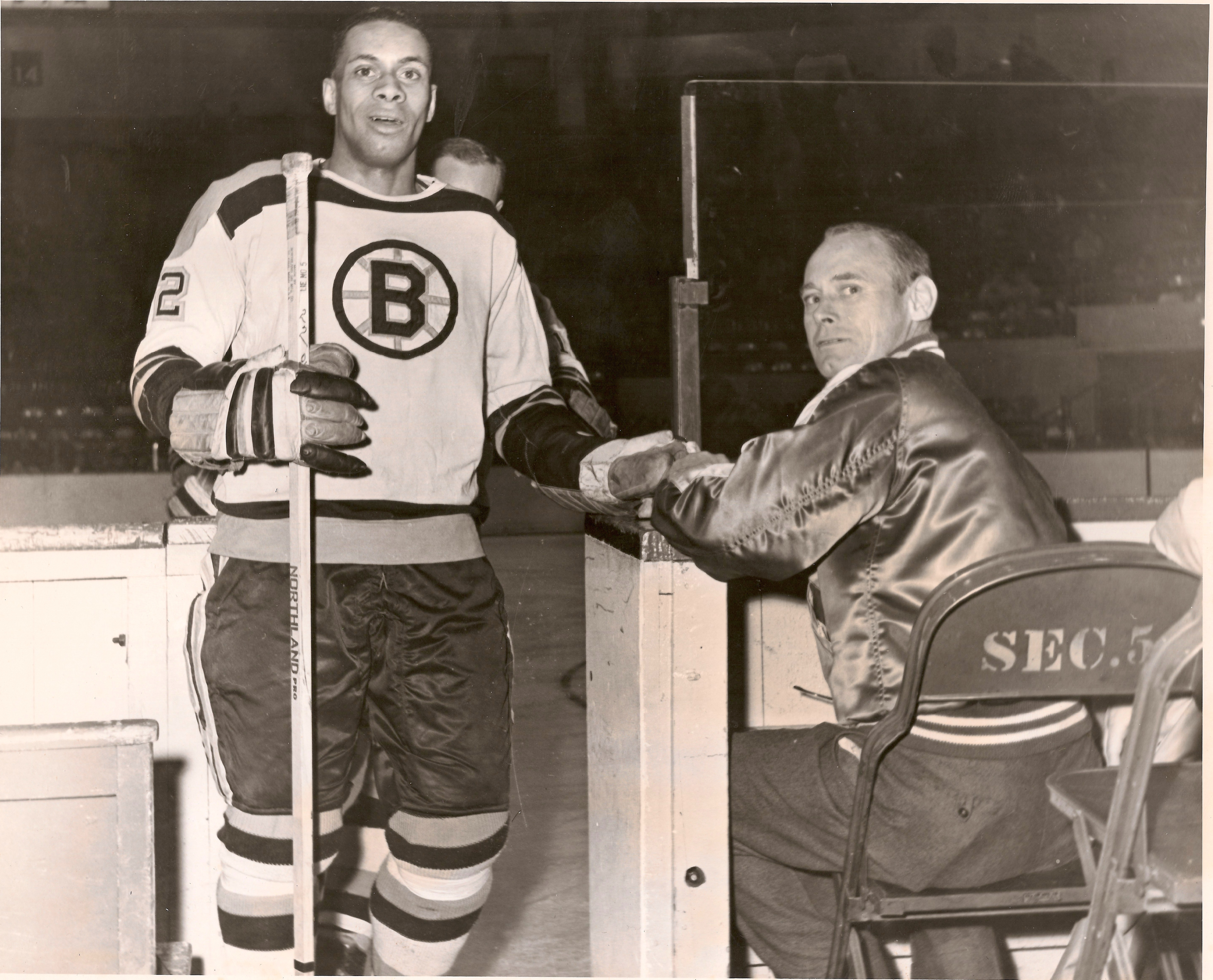
Willie O'Ree (left) in 1961

- Willie O'Ree became the first black player in the National Hockey League when he debuted for the Boston Bruins in a game against the Montreal Canadiens. A Canadian citizen, he was called up from the Bruins' minor league farm team, the Quebec Aces, to replace Leo Labine, who was out for an illness. O'Ree played for a few minutes in the third period.
- Near Maxton, North Carolina (in Robeson County, where the plurality of the population, or 37 percent, is Native American), the battle of Hayes Pond took place when "Catfish" Cole of South Carolina, leader of a Ku Klux Klan affiliate, the North Carolina Knights, brought 50 Klansmen to a rally near the community of the newly recognized Lumbee Tribe of North Carolina. The rally, which followed the burning of crosses on the lawns of two Lumbee families, was surrounded by several hundred Lumbees, many armed with rifles, who encircled the Klansmen and forced them to flee.
- CBS telecast the first of Leonard Bernstein's Young People's Concerts with the New York Philharmonic. The Emmy-winning series, telecast three times per year, would run for more than 14 years and make Bernstein a household name, and the most famous orchestra conductor in the U.S.
- Born: Jeffrey Williams, United States Army officer and NASA astronaut; in Superior, Wisconsin
- Died: Archie "Stomp" Gordon, 31, American jump blues singer and pianist, died from a liver ailment and pneumonia in New York City, while sitting in his parked car. His body was found the next day.

== January 19, 1958 (Sunday) ==
- A 7.8 magnitude earthquake killed 111 people in the South American nations of Ecuador and Colombia. Striking at 9:07 in the morning local time, the quake struck 40 miles (64 km) off of the coast of southern Colombia and killed 30 people in the coastal resort of Esmeraldas in Ecuador.
- Voting was held for the office of President of Guatemala, as well as for the 66-member unicameral Congreso de la República. Because no candidate received at more than 50 percent of the popular vote, the Congress chose on February 12 between the top two finishers, Miguel Ydígoras and José Luis Cruz Salazar, who had won about 41% and 30% of the vote, respectively.
- Dr. Vivian Fuchs and his team of explorers on the Commonwealth Trans-Antarctic Expedition became the second group in a month to reach the South Pole, where they were greeted by Sir Edmund Hillary, another member of the expedition, whose team had arrived on January 4. For the Fuchs team, the South Pole was the halfway point in the journey and they would continue the rest of the way to the other side of the continent, arriving on March 2 to become the first persons to complete a journey from one side of Antarctica to the other.
- Elections were held for the 18-member National Council of Monaco, with 982 of the 1,216 registered voters in the European principality casting ballots. The Union Nationale des Indépendants (UND) Party won 11 seats for a majority, and its leader Joseph Simon became the council's president.
- The Canadian Football League, a unification of the four-team Interprovincial Rugby Football Union (IRFU) and the five-team Western Interprovincial Football Union (WIFU), came into existence as the nine team owners agreed unanimously to a renaming of the Canadian Football Council, and to have common rules on roster limitations, including the number of non-Canadian "imports" allowed for all teams. The owners closed their three-day meeting in Winnipeg by agreeing to have the same game rules for the Western Conference (formerly the WIFU) and the Eastern Conference (IRFU), and to agree to the authority of a national commissioner, G. Sydney Halter.
- Born:
  - Thomas Kinkade, American landscape painter and entrepreneur who mass-marketed his creations commercially under the trademark "Painter of Light"; in Sacramento, California (committed suicide, 2012)
  - Allen Steele, American science fiction author; in Nashville, Tennessee
- Died: Field Marshal Candido Rondon, 90, Brazilian Army officer known for his work in protecting indigenous Brazilian tribes, later serving as the first director of the South American nation's federal Serviço de Proteção aos Índios (SPI). The Federal Territory of Guapore was renamed Rondônia in his honor in 1956, and is now one of the states of Brazil.

== January 20, 1958 (Monday) ==
- Representatives of Japan and Indonesia signed a peace treaty, formally ending the 16-year state of war that had started when Japan attacked the Dutch East Indies during World War II.
- The Soviet Union agreed to release 21 German scientists and technicians (along with 12 dependents) who had been captured at the end of World War II and kept for 13 years to work at the Sukhumi laboratories on Russia's rocketry and nuclear programs. The release followed the 1955 demand by West German Chancellor Konrad Adenauer that the Germans in Sukhumi be repatriated to West Germany. The first 12 scientists (with 18 family members) returned on February 12 on a train from Sukhumi, with two disembarking at East Berlin and the other 10 arriving at Helmstedt, the closest border crossing in West Germany.
- Born:
  - Lorenzo Lamas, American television actor; in Santa Monica, California
  - Hiroaki Zakoji, Japanese classical music composer; in Asahikawa, Hokkaido prefecture (d. of cardiac failure, 1987)
- Died: Herb Bennett, 72, Australian rules footballer

== January 21, 1958 (Tuesday) ==
- Charles Starkweather and his 14-year-old girlfriend Caril Ann Fugate began an 8-day string of murders that would claim the lives of 10 people, starting Starkweather's killing of the Bartlett family, Fugate's mother, half-sister and stepfather in Lincoln, Nebraska. The bodies of Marion Bartlett, his wife Velda and their daughter Betty Jean were not discovered until six days later, hidden in a shed behind their home. Starkweather had earlier killed a gas station attendant, Robert Colvert, on November 30. By the time of the pair's arrest in Wyoming on January 29, ten more people had been murdered. Starkweather would be executed on June 25, 1959, at the penitentiary in his hometown of Lincoln.
- A general strike of employees in Caracas was followed by rioting by thousands of Venezuelan citizens demanding the resignation or overthrow of President Marcos Pérez Jiménez. The Venezuelan National Guard attempted to suppress the rioting and at least 20 people were killed on the first day, and 1,000 arrested.
- Born:
  - Hussein Saeed Mohammed, Iraqi soccer football forward with 137 appearances for the national team from 1976 to 1990, later the president of the Iraq Football Association from 2004 to 2010; in Baghdad
  - Kim Boo-kyum, Prime Minister of South Korea beginning in 2021; in Sangju, North Gyeongsang province

== January 22, 1958 (Wednesday) ==
- Soviet Communist Party First Secretary Nikita Khrushchev, the de facto leader of the U.S.S.R., announced in a speech to agricultural specialists in Minsk that he wanted to phase out the machine tractor station (MTS) entities that owned and maintained all agricultural equipment on the Communist nation's collective farms, owned and operated by the government with the farmers as the employees. Under his proposal, which would be approved by the Poltiburo and implemented later in the year, the machinery would be distributed directly to the farms in charge of maintenance, and the MTS units would be operated solely for repairs and providing spare parts. His speech would be published on January 25. The Soviet Communist Party would approve the plan on February 27.
- UFO conspiracy theorist and retired U.S. Marine Major Donald Keyhoe, co-founder of the National Investigations Committee On Aerial Phenomena (NICAP), appeared for a live interview on the CBS program Armstrong Circle Theatre to discuss government censorship of his findings, and was himself censured by the TV network. During the episode "U. F. O. — Enigma of the Skies", Keyhoe was starting to say "We are meeting in secret with a congressional committee. If these meetings were public it would be proved..." and his microphone was turned off by the show's producer, Robert Costello. The silencing came as Keyhoe departed from his script, which had been pre-screened by the U.S. Air Force.
- Died: U.S. Representative Lawrence H. Smith, 65, Congressman for Wisconsin's 1st District since 1941, collapsed and died as he was entering a restaurant inside the Capitol building with a guest. Smith was the fourth member of Congress to die in less than two weeks, following Representatives Russell W. Keeney of Illinois (January 11), August H. Andresen of Minnesota (January 14) and Senator Matthew M. Neely of West Virginia (January 18).

== January 23, 1958 (Thursday) ==
- Marcos Pérez Jiménez, the President of Venezuela and dictator since 1950, was overthrown in a coup d'état by the Venezuelan Armed Forces. At 3:00 in the morning local time, President Perez boarded a Venezuelan Air Force DC-3 and departed the South American nation for Ciudad Trujillo (now Santo Domingo) in the Dominican Republic. His place was taken by a seven-member junta (including two civilians) led by Rear Admiral Wolfgang Larrazábal. Multi-party elections, the first in more than ten years, would later be scheduled for December 7.
- Jimmy Hoffa took office as the new president of the International Brotherhood of Teamsters, more than seven weeks after his scheduled December 1 inauguration. An injunction barring him from taking office had been issued by a federal judge pending resolution of a civil lawsuit filed against Hoffa.

== January 24, 1958 (Friday) ==
- Two former members of the cabinet of West German Chancellor Konrad Adenauer accused him of ruining all chances at reunification with Germany in 1952. Gustav Heinemann (who would later be the West German president) and Thomas Dehler indirectly referred to the four "Stalin Notes" sent between March 10 and August 23, 1952, that had proposed a merger of West Germany and East Germany with continued occupation by the four Allied powers (the U.S., the UK, the U.S.S.R. and France) and were said to have called for free elections to determine Germany's future. Heinemann said "This policy of strength played into the hand of the Soviets," and asked rhetorically of Adenauer, "How long do you want to continue this game?" Adenauer later admitted the existence of the Stalin notes, but denied that they made reference to free elections, and accused Heinemann and Dehler of distorting the contents for political reasons.
- Born: Jools Holland, British musician for the band Squeeze and television host; in Blackheath, London

== January 25, 1958 (Saturday) ==
- With the first U.S. satellite, Explorer 1, as its payload, the U.S. Navy's Vanguard rocket came within 14 seconds of being launched after four days of repeated cancellations. On December 6, the test Vanguard vehicle had risen no higher than 4 feet (1.2 m) before exploding and falling back on the launch pad. Countdowns on the backup Vanguard rocket had started on January 22 and had been stopped 9 minutes, 4½ minutes, and 22 seconds before liftoff before the final try was aborted shortly after 10:00 pm on Saturday night. Instead, the task was transferred to the U.S. Army's rocket, the Jupiter-C, to carry Explorer 1.
- David Petrovsky, a Soviet writer who had been executed on September 10, 1937, after being convicted of counterrevolutionary activity, was posthumously rehabilitated by the Soviet Supreme Court.
- Died: Robert R. Young, 60, American financier and chairman of the board of the New York Central Railroad, committed suicide at his mansion in Palm Beach, Florida.

== January 26, 1958 (Sunday) ==
- Violent storms in Japan sank the ferryboat Nankai Maru, with 170 people (141 passengers and 29 crew) on board, as it was attempting to cross the Kii strait. The ferry had departed Komatsujima (on Shikoku) island at 5:30 p.m., bound for Wakayama 50 miles (80 km) away on Honshu island, and did not arrive. The freighter Shofuku Maru Number 3, with a crew of 27, capsized near the shore of Kushimoto, and only five persons survived. Another five vessels, with 30 people on board, sank as well.
- HIFAR (High Flux Australian Reactor), the first nuclear reactor in Australia, became operational after achieving criticality at the laboratory of the Australian Atomic Energy Commission in Lucas Heights, New South Wales, near Sydney.
- Born:
  - Ellen DeGeneres, American comedian, actress, television host and LGBTQ activist; in Metairie, Louisiana
  - Anita Baker, Grammy Award-winning American R&B singer; in Toledo, Ohio
  - Anatoly Nagiyev, Russian Soviet serial killer and rapist; in Angarsk, Irkutsk Oblast, RSFSR (executed 1981)

== January 27, 1958 (Monday) ==
- The "Lacy-Zarubin Agreement", a pact between the United States and the Soviet Union on cultural, educational and scientific exchanges, was signed in Washington, D.C. by the U.S. State Department's Special Assistant on East-West Exchanges, William S.B. Lacy and Soviet Ambassador to the U.S. Georgy Zarubin. The parties were not able to agree on the U.S. request to stop the jamming of Western radio broadcasts or the Soviet request to allow direct air service to the U.S. In September, the first-ever student exchange between American and Soviet universities would begin, with each nation permitting 20 graduate students to visit the other.
- Willard Fazar and other members of the U.S. Navy's Special Projects Office (SPO) began working on developing the program evaluation research task (PERT) technique, a statistical tool for effective project management, initially for development of the Navy's Polaris nuclear submarine. James J. O'Brien, Fazar would write later in an article for The American Statistician "Through an electronic computer, the PERT technique processes data representing the major, finite accomplishments (events) essential to achieve end-objectives; the inter-dependence of those events; and estimates of time and range of time necessary to complete each activity between two successive events."
- Janos Kadar, the First Secretary of the Hungarian Socialist Workers' Party that ruled Hungary's Communist government and the person who had called in the Soviet Union to suppress the Hungarian Revolution of 1956, stepped down from his position of head of government, resigning the post of Chairman of the Council of Ministers. Kadar continued to be the de facto ruler of Hungary as the party secretary. Kadar was replaced by his closest ally, Interior Minister Ferenc Münnich.
- A gun battle between in Nicosia between the British Army and Turkish Cypriots of the group EOKA, erupted after demonstrations by the EOKA nationalists against the British colonial government. Seven of the Turkish Cypriots were killed.

== January 28, 1958 (Tuesday) ==
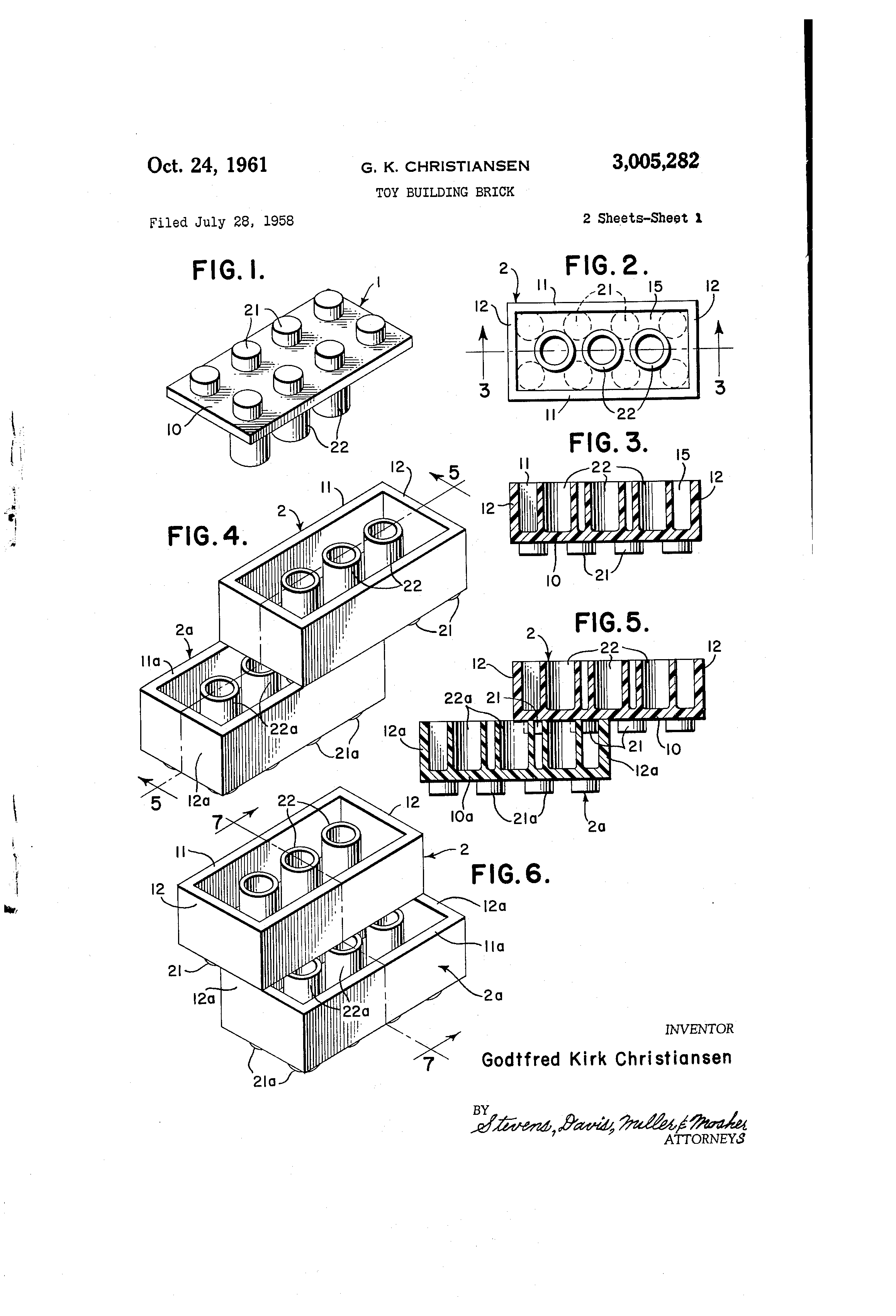
patent application for the "Toy Building Brick"

- Godtfred Kirk Christiansen filed the first patent for the invention developed by himself and his father, Ole Kirk Christiansen, the popular Lego interlocking block. Christiansen received Denmark Patent DK3005282X and, on July 28, would file for an application for "Toy Building Brick" (described as "toy building bricks or blocks adapted to be connected together by means of projections extending from the faces of the elements and arranged so as to engage protruding portions of an adjacent element when two such elements are assembled") in the U.S. patent which would be granted on October 24, 1961, as U.S. Patent No. 3,005,282.

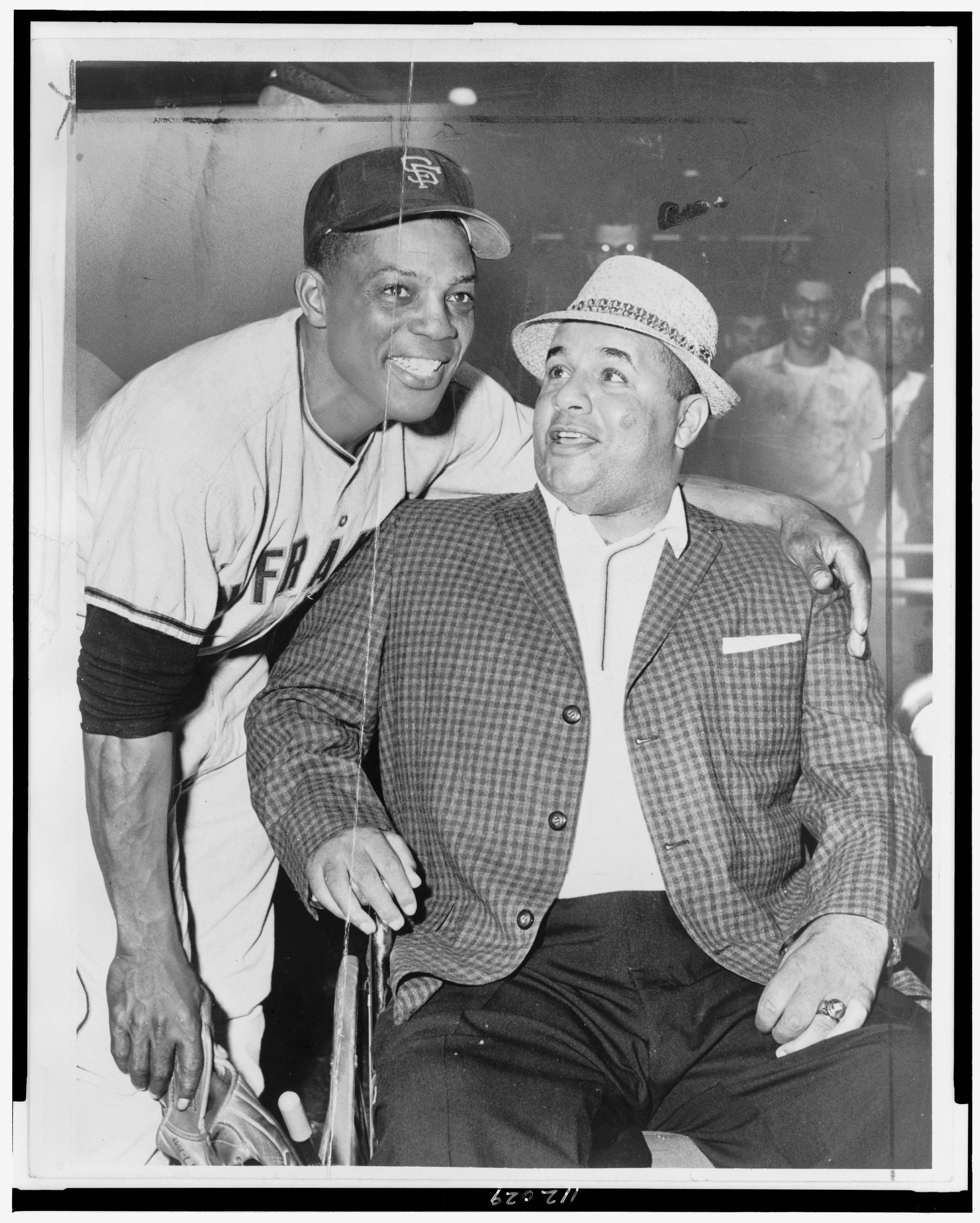
Roy Campanella (right) and Willie Mays in 1961

- American major league baseball star Roy Campanella was paralyzed from an automobile accident, after his car hit a patch of ice, crashed into a telephone pole and overturned near his home. Campanella, an African-American player in the Negro National League from 1937 to 1945, before being signed by the Brooklyn Dodgers in 1948, partially recovered the use of his arms and hands through therapy, and would be inducted into the Baseball Hall of Fame in 1969, but would remain unable to walk, dying in 1993.

== January 29, 1958 (Wednesday) ==
- Charles Starkweather and Caril Ann Fugate were arrested near Douglas, Wyoming, after Starkweather had killed at least 10 people in a little more than a week. Starkweather's last victim had been Merle Collison, a traveling salesman who had been sleeping in his car.

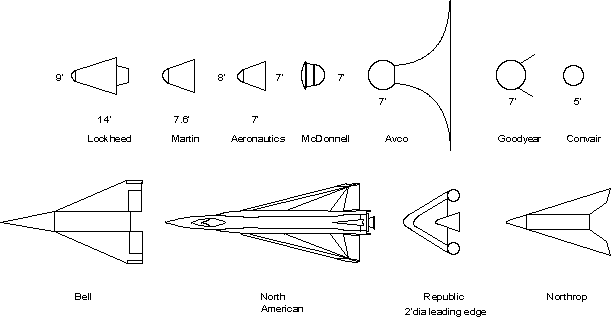
January 1958 contractor proposals for US crewed spacecraft

- A conference began at Wright-Patterson Air Force Base, Ohio, to review concepts for crewed orbital vehicles, and would conclude on January 31. The NACA informally presented two concepts then under study at Langley Aeronautical Laboratory: the one proposed by Maxime A. Faget involved a ballistic, high-drag capsule with heat shield on which the pilot lies prone during reentry, with reentry being accomplished by reverse thrust at the apogee of the elliptical orbit involving a deceleration load of about 8g, and proceeding to impact by a parachute landing; the other Langley proposal called for the development of a triangular planform vehicle with a flat bottom having some lift during reentry. At this same meeting there were several Air Force contractor presentations. These were as follows: Northrop, boost-glide buildup to orbital speed; Martin, zero-lift vehicle launched by a Titan with controlled flight estimated to be possible by mid-1961; McDonnell, ballistic vehicle resembling Faget's proposal, weighing 2,400 pounds (1,100 kg) and launched by an Atlas with a Polaris second stage; Lockheed, a 20-degree semiapex angle cone with a hemispherical tip of 1-foot (0.30 m) radius, pilot in sitting position facing rearward, to be launched by an Atlas-Hustler combination; Convair reviewed a previous proposal for a large-scale crewed space station, but stated a minimum vehicle - a 1,000-pound (450 kg) sphere - could be launched by an Atlas within a year; Aeronutronic, cone-shaped vehicle with spherical tip of 1-foot (0.30 m) radius, with pilot enclosed in sphere inside vehicle and rotated to line the pilot up with accelerations, and launched by one of several two-stage vehicles; Republic, the Ferri sled vehicle, a 4,000-pound (1,800 kg), triangular plan with a 2-foot (0.61 m) diameter tube running continuous around the leading and trailing edge and serving as a fuel tank for final-stage, solid-propellant rockets located in each wing tip, with a pilot in small compartment on top side, and with a heat-transfer ring in the front of the nose for a glide reentry of 3,600 miles per hour (5,800 km/h) with pilot ejecting from capsule and parachuting down, and the launch vehicle comprising three stages; AVCO, a 1,500-pound (680 kg) vehicle sphere launched by a Titan, equipped with a stainless-steel-cloth parachute whose diameter would be controlled by compressed air bellows and which would orient the vehicle in orbit, provide deceleration for reentry, and control drag during reentry; Bell, reviewed proposals for boost-glide vehicles, but considered briefly a minimum vehicle, spherical in shape, weighing about 3,000 pounds (1,400 kg); Goodyear, a spherical vehicle with a rearward facing tail cone and ablative surface, with flaps deflected from the cone during reentry for increased drag and control, and launched by an Atlas or a Titan plus a Vanguard second stage; North American, extend the X-15 program by using the X-15 with a three-stage launch vehicle to achieve a single orbit with an apogee of 400,000 feet (120,000 m) and a perigee of 250,000 feet (76,000 m), range about 500 miles (800 km) to 600 miles (970 km) and landing in the Gulf of Mexico, and the pilot ejecting and landing by parachute with the aircraft being lost.
- Died: Jan Müller, 35, German-born figurative expressionist painter

== January 30, 1958 (Thursday) ==
- Ten people were killed and 89 injured in a railway accident in the UK when one passenger train passed through a danger signal and crashed into the rear of another passenger train that had stopped at the Dagenham East tube station. The accident happened at 7:34 pm local time in foggy conditions. Each train had 500 passengers in 11 coaches.
- The play Sunrise at Campobello by Dore Schary, based on the struggle of U.S. President Franklin D. Roosevelt against polio, was performed for the first time, making its debut at the Cort Theatre on Broadway, and featuring Ralph Bellamy in the role of Mr. Roosevelt. Campobello would win a Tony Award for Best Play, along with Tonys for Bellamy, featured actor Henry Jones, and Director Vincent J. Donehue, and be adapted into a film of the same name in 1960.
- An attack bomber exploded on the flight deck of the aircraft carrier USS Hancock (CV-19), on exercises out of San Diego, killing two of the crew.
- Born: Derek White, Scottish rugby union player with 42 appearances for the Scotland national team; in Haddington, East Lothian
- Died:
  - Jean Crotti, 79, French painter
  - Ernst Heinkel, 70, German aircraft designer and manufacturer who founded the company Heinkel Flugzeugwerke and created both the Heinkel He 178 (the first turbojet airplane) and the Heinkel He 176, the first rocket powered aircraft.

== January 31, 1958 (Friday) ==
- Airplanes landed on the ground of Antarctica for the first time after the southernmost airfield was created by bulldozing at Marble Point at a U.S. research base on Victoria Land, adjacent to the waters of McMurdo Sound. Seaplanes had landed in Antarctic waters, and runways had been created on snow or ice, both of which cracked or disappeared soon after their creation. Sir Edmund Hillary and U.S. Navy Rear Admiral George J. Dufek arrived in one of the two VX-6 Otter airplanes.
- China's leader Mao Zedong issued the written blueprint for his Great Leap Forward campaign with the publication of the document "Sixty Articles on Work Methods" (Gongzuo fangfa liushitiao).
- Syria's President Shukri al-Quwatli arrived in Egypt to join in a merger agreement of Syria and Egypt into the United Arab Republic. Egypt's president, Gamel Abdel Nasser, welcomed him at Cairo.
- The French Navy sank the submarine Rubis between Cavalaire and Saint-Tropez for use as a sonar target.
- In the U.S., the International Brotherhood of Teamsters signed a consent decree with the federal government agreeing to oversight and investigation of the union by an independent, neutral panel.
- Lieutenant General Donald L. Putt, Air Force Director of Research and Development, sent a letter to Dr. Hugh Dryden, Director of NACA, inviting NACA participation in the Air Force effort in the crewed ballistic rocket program. Dryden informed the Air Force that NACA was preparing crewed spacecraft designs for submission in March 1958.
- The United States launched a satellite into orbit for the first time, as Explorer 1 was sent up from Florida's Cape Canaveral on a Jupiter-C rocket at 10:47 pm local time, almost four months after the launch of Sputnik 1 by the Soviet Union. The American satellite was a cylinder with a length of 6 feet and 8 inches (203 cm) and only 6 inches (15.2 cm) in diameter, and it weighed less than 31 pounds (14 kg). For "an agonizing fifteen and three-quarter seconds" after the firing command was given, the giant rocket appeared not to be doing anything but then lifted off. Confirmation that Explorer 1 had reached orbit was made at 1:30 the next morning.
- Born:
  - Armin Reichel, German association football goalkeeper; in Glan-Münchweiler, West Germany
  - Rafael Santana, Dominican Republic Major League Baseball shortstop; in La Romana, Dominican Republic
  - Tom Schuman, American jazz pianist and composer; in Buffalo, New York
