= Four Twenty Seven =

US Climate Change organization

Four Twenty Seven, Inc.
- Industry: Climate risk data firm
- Genre: Data
- Founded: October 2012; 13 years ago
- Founder: Emilie Mazzacurati
- Defunct: 2020
- Headquarters: Berkeley, California, United States
- Key people: Emilie Mazzacurati, Founder and CEO; Colin Shaw, COO; Frank Freitas CDO
- Website: 427mt.com

Four Twenty Seven, Inc. (427) was a California-based data research, analysis and advisory firm that measured the physical and societal risks of climate change. The company was headquartered in Berkeley.

In 2019, Moody's Corporation purchased a majority share in Four Twenty Seven. The firm officially became a part of Moody's ESG Solutions Group in 2020, after which the "Four Twenty Seven" brand name was officially retired.

== Background ==
In October 2012, Emilie Mazzacurati established Four Twenty Seven, Inc. in the wake of Hurricane Sandy. Mazzacurati realized that "with the right tools and guidance" including "science-driven risk analytics", business could play a "critical role" in "building resistance" to the hazards caused by climate change. Hurricane Sandy had "demonstrated that the lack of planning for climate impacts could bring even the most powerful financial institutions to their knees". By 2019, Mazzacurati was the chief executive officer (CEO).

Mazzacurati chose the name "Four Twenty Seven" after the CARB's then-goal of lowering annual greenhouse-gas emissions to the equivalent of 427 metric tons of carbon dioxide by 2020.

== Services ==
Four Twenty Seven measured "the physical risks of climate change" including hazards such as "extreme rainfall, hurricanes, heat stress and sea level rise." The data tracked climate impact on 2,000 companies and 196 countries worldwide, including 761 cities and more than 3,000 counties in the United States.

== Acquisition ==
On July 24, 2019, Moody's announced that they had acquired a controlling share in Four Twenty Seven, adding that the investment "solidifies [Moody's] commitment to promoting transparent and globally consistent standards for evaluating environmental, social, and governance risks and opportunities." A July 25, 2019 article in The New York Times said that this acquisition was the "latest indication that global warming can threaten the creditworthiness of governments and companies" globally. Environmental Finance said that Moody's controlling share of Four Twenty Seven was part of "the wave of consolidation in the environmental, social and governance (ESG) sector".

After the acquisition, Mazzacurati assumed the role of Global Head of Climate Solutions at Moody's ESG Solutions.
