= Moody's Manual =

Investment guides

Moody's Manual is a series of manuals published by Moody's Corporation. It was first published in 1900 by John Moody, nine years before he founded Moody's. Initially called Moody's Manual of Industrial and Miscellaneous Securities, it was later superseded by Moody's Manual of Railroads and Corporation Securities, then by Moody's Analyses of Investments. Until 1990's, they published a series of manuals on publicly traded stocks both in the United States and internationally.

== Selected historic publications ==
Moody's Analyses of Railroad Investments; OCLC 5838960

1. 1st Year (1909)
2. 2nd Year (1910)
3. 3rd Year (1912)

Moody's Analyses of Investments, Moody's Investors Service (OCLC 183311928; 1913–1919)

Part I – Steam Railroads

4. 4th Year (1913)
5. 5th Year (1914)
6. 6th Year (1915)
7. 7th Year (1916)
8. 8th Year (1917)
9. 9th Year (1918)
10. 10th Year (1919)

Part II – Public Utilities and Industrials

11. 5th Year (1914)
12. 6th Year (1915)
13. 7th Year (1916)
14. 8th Year (1917)
15. 9th Year (1918)
16. 10th Year (1919)

Part III – Government and Municipal Securities

17. 10th Year (1919)

Part I – Railroad Investments (industry name change)

18. 11th Year (1920)

Part II – Industrial Investments

19. 11th Year (1920)
20. 12th Year (1921)

Part III – Public Utility Investments

21. 11th Year (1920)

Part IV – Government and Municipal Securities

22. 11th Year (1920)
23. 13th Year (1922)
