= Anatoly Nagiyev =

Soviet serial killer, mass murderer and rapist

- Born: Anatoly Huseinovich Nagiyev; 26 January 1958; Angarsk, Irkutsk Oblast, RSFSR
- Died: 28 October 1981 (aged 23); Novocherkassk, Rostov Oblast, RSFSR
- Cause of death: Execution by shooting
- Other names: "The Mad One" "The Pugacheva Hunter" "The Kursk Maniac"
- Conviction: Murder
- Penalty: Death

Details
- Victims: 6+
- Span of crimes: 1979–1980
- Country: Soviet Union
- State: Komi ASSR
- Date apprehended: 29 September 1981

Anatoly Huseinovich Nagiyev (Russian: Анато́лий Гусе́йнович Наги́ев; 26 January 1958 – 28 October 1981), known as The Mad One (Russian: Бешеный), was a Soviet serial killer, mass murderer and rapist who killed at least 6 women with severe cruelty between 1979 and 1980. He also raped at least 30 women over the same period of time and pursued famous Soviet singer Alla Pugacheva in an attempt to kill her.

== Early life ==
Nagiyev was born on 26 January 1958 in Angarsk in a family from Dagestan, or according to other sources, they were Ingush or Kazakh. Subsequently, the family with three children moved to the Kursk Oblast and settled in the city of Sudzha. Nagiyev actively engaged in sports, primarily athletic gymnastics, but was very aggressive since childhood. He had problems with girls, with some claiming they did not pay attention to him due to his small height of 1,57 metres. Between May and June 1975, he committed 3 rapes and was sentenced to 6 years in prison, which he served in the Komi ASSR. In 1979, he was released on parole for his good behaviour.

== Murders ==
After his release, he worked in the village of Chikshino in the Pechora region of the Komi ASSR. On 30 January 1979, in the city of Pechora, he raped and killed an accidental acquaintance named Olga Demyanenko in her apartment. On 28 May, he raped and killed a train passenger named Daria Kravchenko, who was going to Pechora, taking advantage of the fact that the car was almost empty. The body was hidden in the luggage compartment under the seats. According to some accounts, the victim was killed because she resembled Alla Pugacheva.

Nagiyev soon returned to Kursk, where he got a job as a projectionist of a mobile cinema installation. The working conditions allowed him to spend a lot of time outside his permanent home.

On 4 July 1980, in a half-empty car on the train "Moscow-Kharkiv", he raped and killed 4 women - two conductors (Derevyanko and Zizyulina) and two passengers (Maria Lopatkina and Tatiana Kolesnikova). The victims' bodies were then thrown out of the window in the Oryol area between the stations "Stalnoi Kon" and "Stanovoi Kolodez".

In addition, from November 1979 to September 1980, he committed more than 30 rapes in various settlements of the USSR.

== Arrest, trial and execution ==
On the day of the last murders, Nagiyev, with traces of blood on his clothes and a knife in his hand, noticed the train's electrician but did not kill him. The detectives made a detailed list of the things that he had taken from his victims, and the jewellery descriptions were sent to pawnshops and jewellery stores in several cities of the USSR. Nagiyev gave one such jewellery to an acquaintance, and when he came with a ring into a jewellery store in Kursk, he was identified. The acquaintance then told authorities who had given him the ring. The house of Nagiyev's mother was searched, during which his notebook with various addresses in various settlements of the USSR was found.

On 12 September 1980, Nagiyev was arrested in Dnipro. He was originally sent to a detention centre in Oryol, but after a few months, he tried to escape, tearing off his handcuffs and headbutting the guards, but was ultimately detained. Soon he was transferred to the Kursk SIZO for more intensive protection. After this, Nagiyev began to admit to his crimes, including those he was initially not aware of, for example, the two murders. It was also suggested that he committed more murders than he confessed to. In addition, while serving time, Nagiyev said that he wanted to kill Alla Pugacheva, and for this reason, travelled several times to Moscow.

On 2 July 1981, Nagiyev was sentenced to death by the Kursk Regional Court, and was to be executed by firing squad.

In early August 1981, it was reported that Nagiyev had been transferred to the Novocherkassk prison so his death penalty could be carried out. On 19 August, on his arrival in Novocherkassk, he managed to escape by slipping past a passing train. The then Minister of Interior Affairs, Nikolai Shchelokov, expected the killer to be captured in three weeks, but he was caught after two months. Nagiyev was hiding in one of the farms near Novocherkassk under the guise of being Romani, where he aroused suspicion from local residents, who alerted the police. On 29 September 1981, he was rearrested, which he actively resisted, suffering several bullet wounds as a result. The doctors were hardly able to heal his wounds, and on 28 October 1981, he was executed in the Novocherkassk prison.

== In the media ==
- In 2010, a documentary film titled "Wipe the Mad out!" was produced for the series "The investigation was conducted..", based on Nagiyev's story
- The documentary series "Legends of Soviet Detection" had an episode on him titled "The Pugacheva Hunter"
- Nagiyev was also mentioned in the documentary film "The Age Will Not See" (2010)

== See also ==
- List of Russian serial killers
