= Herb Bennett =

Australian rules footballer

Personal information
- Full name: Herbert Henry Bennett
- Born: 12 March 1885; Winchelsea, Victoria
- Died: 20 January 1958 (aged 72); Winchelsea, Victoria
- Original team: Winchelsea

Playing career^{1}
Years	Club	Games (Goals)
1907–08	Geelong	8 (1)
- ^{1} Playing statistics correct to the end of 1908.

Herbert Henry Bennett (12 March 1885 – 20 January 1958) was an Australian rules footballer who played with Geelong in the Victorian Football League (VFL).
