= John Moody (financial analyst) =

American financial businessman

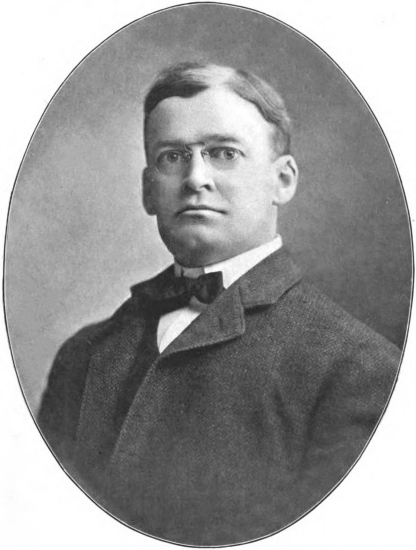
- 1903
- Born: May 2, 1868; Jersey City, New Jersey, U.S.
- Died: February 16, 1958 (aged 89); La Jolla, California, U.S.
- Occupations: Financial analyst, businessman, investor
- Known for: Founder of Moody's

John Moody (May 2, 1868 – February 16, 1958) was an American financial analyst, businessman and investor. He pioneered the rating of bonds and founded Moody's Investors Service. Moody's ratings are still issued, carrying on the tradition begun by Moody's Manual of Railroads and Corporation Securities and continued by the annual Moody's Analyses of Investments.

He resided in Cranford, New Jersey, from 1893 to 1913.

== Moody and bond rating ==
Moody's was later merged into Dun & Bradstreet, only to again become an independent corporation in October 2000. Moody's status is reflected in Thomas Friedman's 1996 comment: that

There are two superpowers in the world today in my opinion. There's the United States and there's Moody's Bond Rating Service. The United States can destroy you by dropping bombs, and Moody's can destroy you by downgrading your bonds. And believe me, it's not clear sometimes who's more powerful. (February 13, 1996 interview with Jim Lehrer)

In 2007, Moody's Corporation was split into two operating divisions, Moody's Investors Service, the rating agency, and Moody's Analytics, with all of its other services.

== Honors ==
Moody was a convert to Roman Catholicism after being raised a self-described Low Church Protestant Episcopalian, then a Broad Church Episcopalian. He received an honorary Doctor of Laws from Boston College, and was made Knight Commander of the Order of the Holy Sepulchre of Jerusalem by Pope Pius XI.

== Family ==
Moody was the son of William Francis Moody (1834–1919) and his wife Sarah Jane, née Nichols (1839–1897). He was one of five children. He was married to Anna Mulford Addison (1877, Nice, France – 1965); their sons were UCLA philosopher and medievalist, Ernest Addison Moody (1903–1975) and John Edmund Moody (1900–1926), who died of typhoid fever in Messina, Sicily.

== Works ==
- The Truth About the Trusts: A Description and Analysis of The American Trust Movement (1904)
- The Art of Wise Investing (1904)
- The Art of Wall Street Investing (1906)
- The Investor's Primer (1907)
- How To Invest Wisely (1912)
- Masters of Capital: A Chronicle of Wall Street (1919)
- The Railroad Builders: A Chronicle of The Welding of The States (1919)
- Profitable Investing: Fundamental of the Science of Investing by Moody (1925)
- The Long Road Home (1933)
- Fast by the Road (1942)
- John Henry Newman (1945)
