= Bahrainization =

Bahraini government initiative

Bahrainization is the Bahraini government's effort to increase the proportion of Bahraini citizens in the country's workforce. Bahrainization involves directives requiring companies to hire Bahraini workers, as well as government-provided training for Bahraini citizens to make them more competitive in the workforce.

== History and examples ==
Aspects of Bahrainization can be found in policies from as early as the 1970s. In the 1980s, the government introduced the "Ten Thousand Scheme", a project to train Bahraini citizens for private sector work.

Bahrainization is often implemented through government directives aimed at specific sectors, such as hospitality, travel, or the private sector as a whole. For example, in the 1990s the government instituted a requirement that only Bahraini citizens could be taxi drivers, and in the 2000s, similar requirements were implemented for truck drivers and workers at petrol stations. Policies sometimes include quotas for the percentage of Bahraini workers in companies in a particular sector.

An example of a Bahrainization-related policy quoted in Andrew Gardner's ethnography City of Strangers is as follows: "Firms are requested to increase employment of nationals by 5 percent a year until one-half of the labor force is Bahraini. New establishments employing 10 or more workers are required to have 20 percent Bahrainis in their workforce, with further annual increase of 5 percent until 50 percent is reached. Firms of less than 10 employees must employ at least one Bahraini other than the owner."

== Impact ==
Bahrainization has been credited for increasing the labor participation rate of Bahraini women. In 2016, Bahrain's private-sector female labor participation rate was only 11.3%, but among Bahraini citizens the corresponding rate was 30%.

Bahrainization policies sometimes have a negative effect on Bahrain's foreign workers. Some foreign workers, including foreign business owners, worry that the changing policies might put their livelihoods at risk. The policies have caused some foreign residents to leave the country; for example, from the 1990s to the 2000s the Lions Club in Riffa saw its membership fall from 75 to less than 40, a decline that was attributed to members moving away because of Bahrainization.

In 2023, there have been an emphasis on raising the minimum monthly wages for Bahrainis in the private sector based on their educational qualifications, with a notable increase for those holding high school diplomas and university degrees. The government has also been subsidizing wages for Bahraini citizens in the private sector through the Labor Market Regulatory Authority, which charges employers a monthly fee for each foreign worker. These funds are then transferred to the Labor Fund, or Tamkeen, an institution aimed at supporting the wages, training, and rehabilitation of Bahraini citizens, as well as assisting Bahraini startups. Furthermore, Gulf Air, the national carrier of Bahrain, received recognition for its Bahrainization efforts as part of the 38th annual ceremony honoring employees and establishments in the private sector for 2023.

== Comparisons with other Gulf states ==
Bahrainization is a form of workforce nationalization (also known as "Gulfization"), similar to Qatarization, Emiratization, and Saudization. Like other Gulfization programs, Bahrainization involves quotas for what fraction or number of employees must be citizens. However, the situation in Bahrain differs from other Gulf countries in some ways; when the quotas were introduced in 1995, Bahrain already had a higher citizen participation rate in the workforce than other Gulf countries.

== See also ==
- Economy of Bahrain
- Labour Market Regulatory Authority (Bahrain)
- Migrant workers in Bahrain
