= Workforce nationalization =

Type of government initiative

Workforce nationalization is a government initiative that can be described as the recruitment and employee development to encourage or often require the employment of native-born population in certain jobs or industry sectors, thus reducing a country‘s dependency on an expatriate workforce. These efforts have been defined as a multi-level process through which reliance on the expatriate workforce is reduced and native-born population is prepared to take up jobs performed by expatriates. Such preparation enables native-born employees to perform their jobs equally as well as, if not better than, expatriates in the shortest possible period.

Establishing a skilled native-born workforce is one of the most critical challenges facing countries of the Gulf Cooperation Council (GCC) from an economic security and a social inclusion perspective. Integration of skilled native-born workforce and reduction of dependence on the expatriate workers has been on the top of agendas of the GCC states. Furthermore, continued economic growth and industrial diversification demand a qualified and competent local workforce. With a growing population of young nationals graduating every year, there is an urgent need to integrate them into the job market especially in the private sector to strike the right balance in representing local talent in the workforce. To meet those challenges, governments adopted human resources development strategies (also known as Bahrainization, Emiratisation, Kuwaitization, Omanization, Qatarization, and Saudization) that target the employment of native-born workforce through various incentives, regulations, policies, educational reforms, and economic diversification plans.

Some forward-thinking organizations realized the benefit of workforce nationalization early on. . GCC states mandated their respective ministries of labor to establish employment quotas for different sectors to employ native-born workers. Failing to achieve these quotas can result in penalties and not being able to win government projects for example. There are different local bodies that are in place and are being set up to provide career advice, coaching, training and development mostly for recent graduates in order to accelerate their careers in the private sector. Each country has set its own nationalization quota focusing predominantly on banks, insurance firms, and commercial companies. Enforcing workforce nationalization in the GCC led to most of the business contracts or agreements with major companies outlining legal requirements for “Workforce Nationalization”, “Local Content”, “Localization” or “Technology and Knowledge Transfer”.

Most of the efforts to enforce workforce nationalization have had mixed success thus far in their sustained implementation for a variety of reasons. According to Ms Randa Bahsoun, Partner – People & Organization Practice, PwC, the Middle East four main challenges in the workforce nationalization, “Balancing workforce nationalization efforts while leveraging experienced expatriate talent; public pressure to reduce local unemployment especially in the backdrop of low oil prices; skill shortages and increased global competition; and integration of women and millennials into the workforce at middle senior management levels.” Another level of challenges stems from the fact that there is little to no systematic approach or framework to dealing with challenges arising from the need for workforce nationalization. Rare and few points of view on the topic of workforce nationalization come from specialized advisories and thought leaders in this space such as Agile Dynamics "Workforce nationalization framework".

A report from Kasim Randeree, senior researcher at the University of Oxford, notes that the GCC states have all “become reliant on migrant workers” in recent decades, with Qatar and the UAE “at the extremity of the situation”. In ‘Workforce Nationalization in the Gulf Cooperation Council States’, he also notes that while much has been written and said on the reasons why these states are looking to nationalize their workforce, “only a limited body of knowledge exists to guide and shape the success of such schemes”. The need for a reliable workforce nationalization framework based on proven business practices is critical now more than ever.

== See also ==
- Bahrainization
- Omanisation
- Qatarization
- Saudisation
- Emiratisation
- Migrant workers in the Gulf Cooperation Council region
- Kafala system
