= Economy of Bahrain =

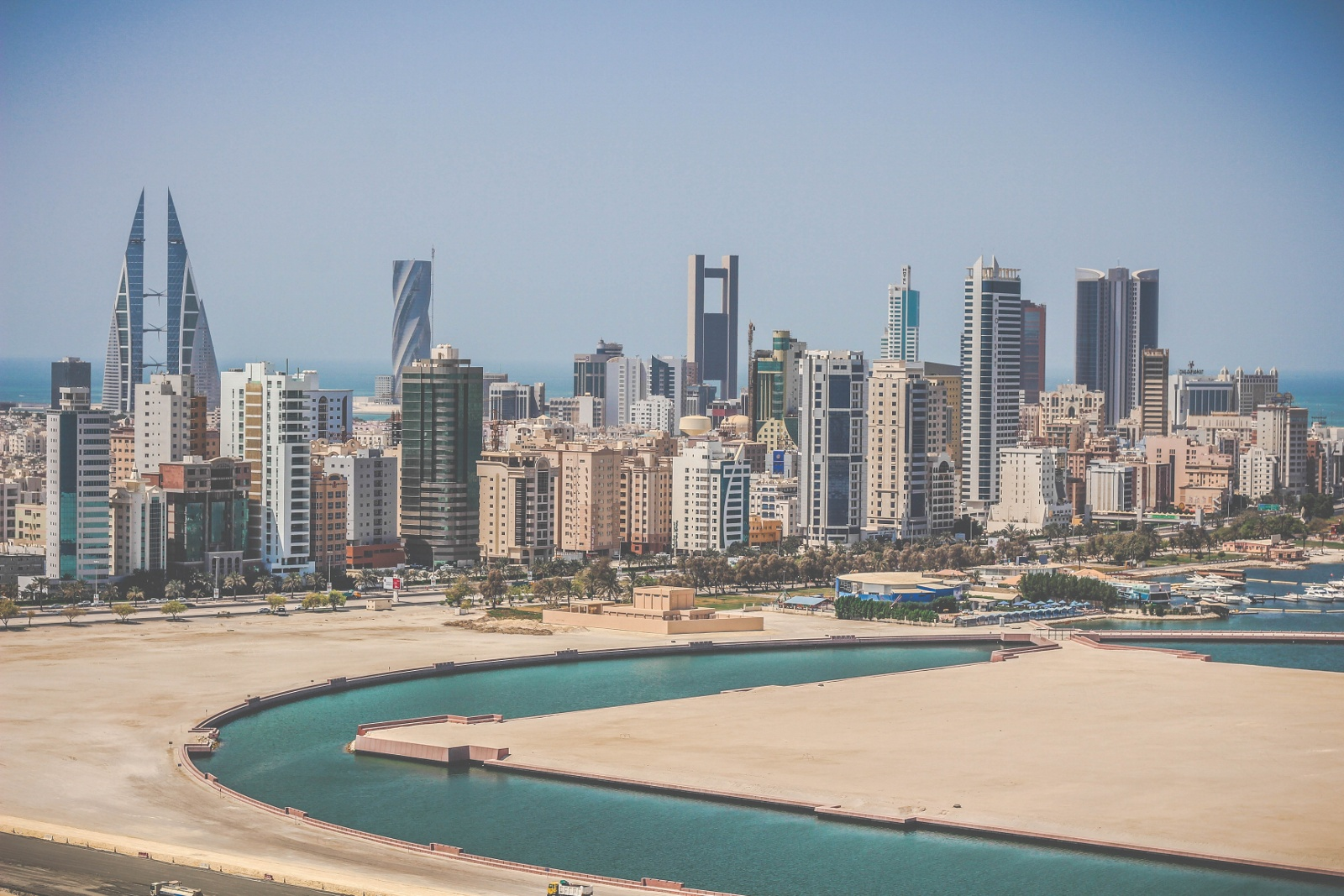
- Manama skyline
- Currency: Bahraini dinar (BHD)
- Fiscal year: Calendar Year
- Trade organisations: WTO and GCC
- Country group: Developing/Emerging; High-income economy

Statistics
- Population: ▲1,588,670 (2024)
- GDP: ▲$47.39 billion (nominal, 2025 est.); ▲$112.22 billion (PPP, 2025 est.)
- GDP rank: 97th (nominal, 2025); 99th (PPP, 2025)
- GDP growth: ▼2.6% (2024); ▲2.9% (2025e); ▲3.3% (2026f); 3.3% (2027f)
- GDP per capita: ▲$29,250 (nominal, 2025 est.); ▲$69,270 (PPP, 2025 est.)
- GDP per capita rank: 45th (nominal, 2025); 24th (PPP, 2025)
- GDP by sector: agriculture: 0.3%; industry: 43.4%; services: 51.9%; (2023 est.)
- Inflation (CPI): ▼0.3% (2025)
- Population below national poverty line: N/A
- Human Development Index: ▲0.899 very high (2023) (38th); N/A IHDI (2022)
- Labour force: ▲913,340 (2024); 70.9% employment rate (2015); 44% of the population in the 15-64 age group is non-national
- Labour force by occupation: agriculture: 1%; industry: 32%; services: 67%; (2004 est.)
- Unemployment: ▼1.1% (2024)
- Main industries: Offshore Banking and Islamic Banking, Aluminum Smelting, Petroleum processing and refining, Iron Pelletization, Fertilizers, Insurance, Ship Repairing, Tourism

External
- Exports: $41.303 billion (2024 est.)
- Export goods: Aluminum, Petroleum and Petroleum Products, Textiles, Gold, Jewellery, Cheese
- Main export partners: United Arab Emirates 16%; Saudi Arabia 15%; South Africa 8%; United States 6%; India 4% (2023 est.)
- Imports: $33.044 billion (2024 est.)
- Import goods: Crude Oil, Machinery, Chemicals, Gold, Jewellery
- Main import partners: China 13%; Saudi Arabia 12%; United Arab Emirates 11%; Brazil 8%; Australia 7% (2023 est.)
- Gross external debt: ▲$60.58 billion (2024 est.)

Public finance
- Government debt: ▲142.5% of GDP (2025 est.)
- Revenue: ▼$8.479 billion (2023)
- Spending: ▲$10.532 billion (2023)
- Credit rating: Standard & Poor's: B+ (Domestic); B+ (Foreign); B+ (T&C Assessment)
- All values, unless otherwise stated, are in US dollars.

The economy of the Kingdom of Bahrain has significantly diversified in recent years to be less dependent on oil and gas, although they remain an important part of the economy. As of 2024, the extraction of oil and natural gas is the third largest sector in the economy. The Kingdom of Bahrain advocates for a mixed economy system. Two examples of Bahrain's advocacy for this system in the late 20th century are heavily investing in the banking and tourism sectors. In 2008, Bahrain was ranked highly in the Global Financial Centres Index (GFCI), which evaluates financial centres using survey responses and quantitative indicators. Bahrain's banking and financial services sector, particularly Islamic banking, have benefited from the regional boom driven by demand for oil. Petroleum is Bahrain's most exported product, accounting for 60% of export receipts, 70% of government revenues, and 11% of GDP. Aluminum is the second most exported product, followed by finance and construction materials.

According to the 2020 edition of the Index of Economic Freedom, Bahrain has the fourth-freest economy in the Middle East and North Africa region and is the 40th-freest economy in the world. One alternative index providing the same statistics places Bahrain at 70th place. Bahrain was recognized by the World Bank as a high-income economy.

== Economy overview ==
Oil and natural gas play a dominant role in Bahrain's economy. Despite efforts to diversify the economy, according to the CIA World Fact Book, oil still comprises 85% of Bahraini budget revenues, meaning that over the last few years, lower world energy prices have generated sizeable budget deficits - about 10% of GDP in 2017 alone. Bahrain's economy depends on oil and gas, international banking, and tourism.

In 2003 and 2004, the balance of payments improved due to rising oil prices and increased receipts from the services sector. As a result, the current account balance registered a surplus of US$219 million in 2003 and a surplus of US$442 million in 2004, compared to a deficit of US$35 million in 2002. Bahrain's gross international reserves increased substantially in 2004 to US$1.6 billion, up from US$1.4 billion in the previous three years (2001-2003).

== History ==
Though current GDP per capita shrank by 2.4% in the 1980s, it bounced back to a growth of 36% in the 1990s, resulting from diversification initiatives. Bahrain's urgency in embracing economic liberalization is due to its need to diversify the economy away from its limited oil supplies. Unlike its Persian Gulf neighbors, Bahrain has little oil wealth, and the economy has expanded into banking, heavy industries, retail, and tourism. The Kingdom is the main banking hub for the Persian Gulf and a center for Islamic finance, which has been attracted by the strong regulatory framework for the industry. According to the International Monetary Fund's Financial System Stability Assessment of Bahrain's financial regulatory environment, published on 6 March 2006, it was found that:

- The financial system is enjoying strong performance under favorable circumstances and is likely to remain a major contributor to overall growth. The main risk stems from potential overheating in the economies of the region, but the system should be resilient to likely shocks.
- Prudential regulations are modern and comprehensive, and supervision is generally effective, especially in the dominant banking sector. Supervisory capacity needs to be expanded in line with new regulations and to keep up with the growth and increasing sophistication of financial institutions.
- The further expansion of the Islamic banking sector, the development of housing finance, and the deepening of securities markets are important for the future growth of the financial system. The banking and insurance sectors will eventually undergo consolidation.

In 2005, Bahrain signed the US-Bahrain Free Trade Agreement, becoming the first Persian Gulf state to sign such a bilateral trade agreement with the United States. A large-scale privatization program is underway to sell off key government assets: utilities, banks, financial services, and telecommunications have started to come under the control of the private sector.

As a result, the economy has been well-positioned to capitalize on the extra revenues generated in the region, due to the sustained high oil prices since 2002. In January 2006, the United Nations Economic and Social Commission for Western Asia cited Bahrain as the fastest-growing economy in the Arab world.

Between 1981 and 1993, the Bahrain Government's expenditures increased by 64%. During that same time, government revenues continued to be largely dependent on the oil industry and increased by only 4%. Bahrain has at times received significant budgetary support and project grants from Saudi Arabia, Kuwait, and the United Arab Emirates.

The government has used its oil revenues to build an advanced transportation and telecommunications infrastructure. Bahrain is a regional financial and business center. Tourism, especially from the region, has proved another significant source of income.

Bahrain has benefited from the oil boom since 2001, with economic growth of 5.5%. It has succeeded in attracting investment from other Persian Gulf states partly because it used the revenues of the 1970s-early 80s boom to invest in infrastructure development and other projects to improve the standard of living; healthcare, education, public services, and roads have seen improvement.

The success of ventures such as the Bahrain Grand Prix has raised the Kingdom's international profile, and combined with the boom in Islamic banking, has encouraged major airlines to resume services to the country, with Lufthansa announcing on 14 March 2006 that it would schedule three flights a week to Muharraq from Frankfurt.

Bahrain has initiated a series of labor reforms under Minister of Labor Majeed Al Alawi to bring the labor market in line with international standards.

In October 2008, King Hamad bin Isa Al Khalifa announced a comprehensive economic development roadmap known as Economic Vision 2030 that aims to transition Bahrain from oil-based economy to a diversified economy that significantly elevates the living standards of all its citizens.

In 2009, it was announced that the Bahraini Government would be developing land next to the Bahrain International Circuit. The project has been titled @bahrain. @bahrain is part of the Mumtalakat group of companies and will dedicate more than 1 million square meters to business, entertainment, and educational services, with a value in excess of $2bn (BD 850 million).

In July 2023, Bahrain's national origin exports decreased by 23%, valued at BD323 million, while imports fell by 6% to BD441 million, resulting in a trade deficit of BD68 million, according to the Information & Government Authority (iGA) report.

Overall, during 2023, Bahrain's GDP grew by 2.45%, with the non-oil sector increasing by 4.48%.

== Macro-economic statistics ==
Exports of Bahrain by product category (2019) Chemical products Transportation Machines Mineral products Plastics and rubbers Metals Foodstuffs Precious metals Textiles Instruments Animal products Vegetable products Paper goods Footwear and headwear Miscellaneous Stone and glass Wood products Animal and vegetable bi-products Animal hides Arts and antiques Weapons

This is a chart of the trend of gross domestic product of Bahrain at market prices estimated by the International Monetary Fund, with figures in millions of Bahraini Dinars.

Year	Gross Domestic Product	US Dollar Exchange	Inflation Index (year 2000=100)
1980	1,354	0.377 Bahraini Dinars	74
1985	1,609	0.377 Bahraini Dinars	90
1990	1,867	0.377 Bahraini Dinars	89
1995	2,552	0.377 Bahraini Dinars	98
2000	3,408	0.377 Bahraini Dinars	100
2005	6,004	0.377 Bahraini Dinars	105
2010	9,668	0.377 Bahraini Dinars	120
2015	11,675	0.377 Bahraini Dinars	133
2020	13,058	0.377 Bahraini Dinars	139

For purchasing power parity comparisons, the US Dollar is exchanged at 0.30 Bahraini Dinars. Mean wages were $19.81 per man-hour in 2009.

The following table shows the main economic indicators from 1980 to 2024. Inflation below 5% is in green.

Year	GDP (in bil. US$ PPP)	GDP per capita (in US$ PPP)	GDP (in bil. US$ nominal)	GDP growth (real)	Inflation (in Percent)	Government debt (in % of GDP)
1980	7.3	20,779	3.6	▲7.5 %	▲3.8 %	n/a
1985	▲11.4	▲27,186	▲4.3	▼−0.9 %	▲−2.4 %	n/a
1990	▲14.7	▲30,044	▲5.0	▲3.5 %	▲1.3 %	▲8 %
1995	▲20.5	▲36,705	▲6.8	▲1.9 %	▲3.1 %	▲14 %
2000	▲28.0	▲43,920	▲9.1	▲7.0 %	▲−0.7 %	▲26 %
2005	▲40.4	▲45,440	▲16.0	▲6.8 %	▲2.6 %	▼24 %
2010	▲58.2	▲47,117	▲25.7	▲4.3 %	▲2.0 %	▲30 %
2011	▲60.6	▲50,673	▲28.8	▲2.0 %	▲−0.3 %	▲33 %
2012	▲65.9	▲54,489	▲30.7	▲3.7 %	▲2.8 %	▲36 %
2013	▲67.7	▼54,035	▲32.5	▲5.4 %	▲3.3 %	▲44 %
2014	▲68.3	▼51,938	▲33.4	▲4.4 %	▲2.6 %	44 %
2015	▼62.5	▼45,627	▼31.1	▲2.5 %	▲1.8 %	▲66 %
2016	▲63.8	▼44,834	▲32.2	▲3.8 %	▲2.8 %	▲81 %
2017	▲71.3	▲47,486	▲35.5	▲4.9 %	▲1.4 %	▲88 %
2018	▲74.5	▲48,424	▲37.8	▲2.0 %	▲2.1 %	▲90 %
2019	▲77.5	▲50,118	▲38.7	▲2.0 %	▲1.0 %	▲97 %
2020	▲78.7	▼48,166	▼34.6	▼−5.9 %	▲−2.3 %	▲126 %
2021	▲82.7	▲48,357	▲39.3	▲4.3 %	▲−0.6 %	▼122 %
2022	▲93.9	▲49,482	▲44.4	▲6.0 %	▲3.6 %	▼111 %
2023	▲100.1	▲57,213	▲46.1	▲3.0 %	▲0.1 %	▲123 %
2024	▲105.6	▲57,503	▲47.8	▲3.0 %	▲1.4 %	▲126 %

== Sectors ==
=== Hydrocarbon industry ===
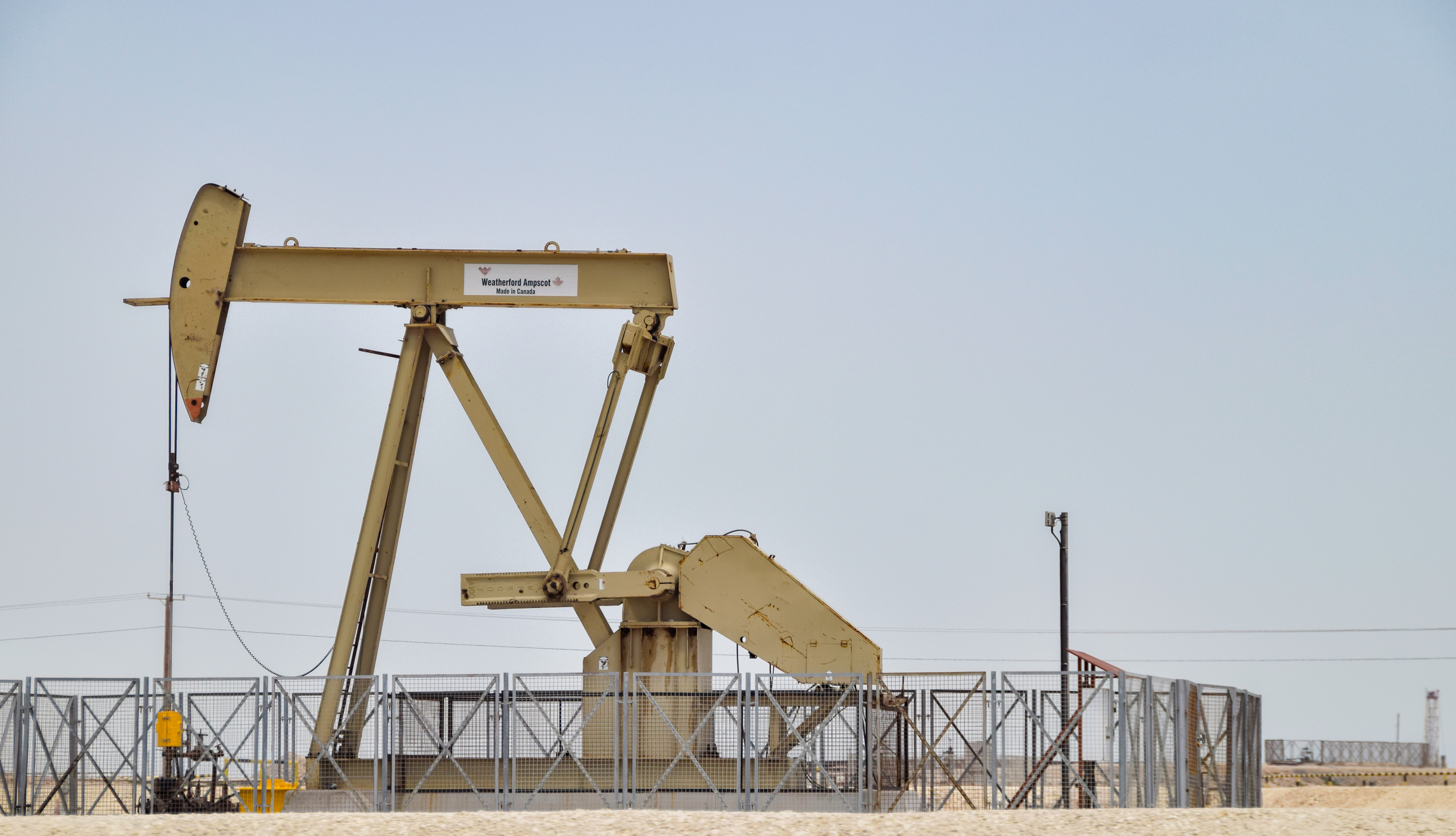
Nodding donkey crude oil pump in Bahrain (2019)

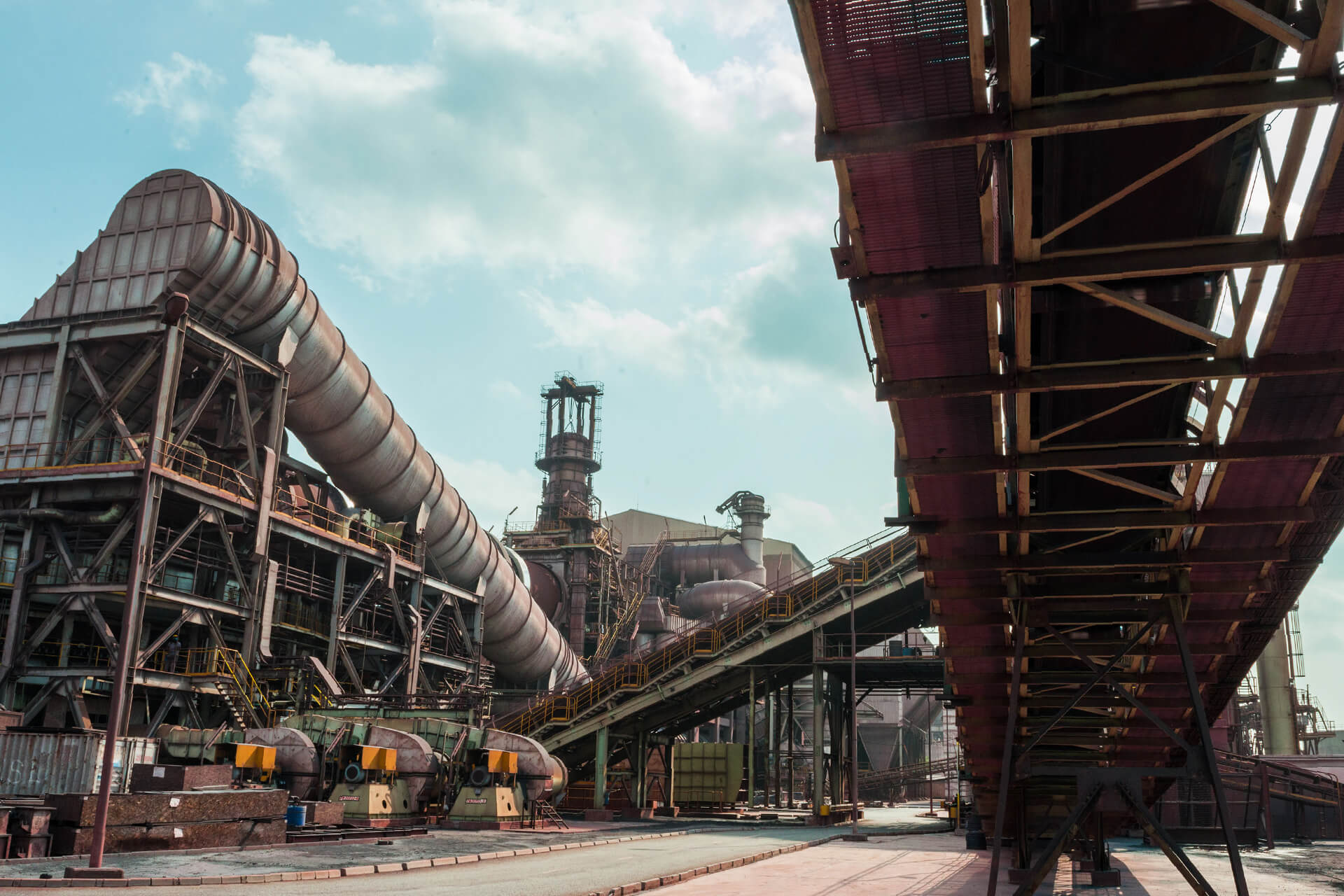
Bahrain Steel's palletizing plant.

Petroleum and natural gas are the only significant natural resources present in Bahrain. Because of its limited reserves, Bahrain has worked to diversify its economy over the decade prior to 2004. Bahrain has stabilized its oil production at about 40,000 barrels (6,400 m³) per day, and reserves are expected to last 10 to 15 years. The Bahrain Petroleum Company refinery was built in 1935, has a capacity of about 250,000 barrels (40,000 m³) per day, and was the first in the Persian Gulf outside of Iran. After selling 60% of the refinery to the state-owned Bahrain National Oil Company in 1980, Caltex, a U.S. company, now owns 40%. Saudi Arabia provides most of the crude for refinery operations via pipeline. Bahrain also receives a large portion of net output and revenues from Saudi Arabia's Abu Saafa offshore oilfield.

The Bahrain National Gas Company operates a gas liquefaction plant that utilizes gas piped directly from Bahrain's oilfields. Gas reserves should last about 50 years at present rates of consumption. The Gulf Petrochemical Industries Company (GPIC) is a joint venture of the petrochemical industries of Kuwait, the Saudi Basic Industries Corporation, and the Government of Bahrain. The plant, completed in 1985, produces ammonia, methanol and urea for export.

=== Agriculture and fishing ===
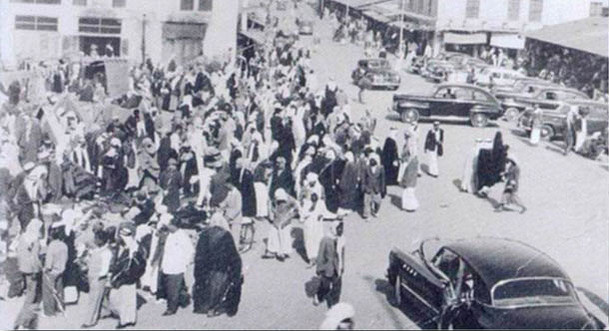
Vegetable market in Bahrain, circa 1930s.

Despite the low rainfall and poor soil, agriculture in Bahrain historically was an important sector of the economy. Before the development of the oil industry, date palm cultivation dominated Bahrain's agriculture, producing sufficient dates for both domestic consumption and export. At least twenty-three varieties of dates are grown, and the leaves, branches, buds, and flowers of the date palm also are used extensively. From the 1950s through the 1970s, changing food consumption habits, as well as the increasing salinity of the aquifers that served as irrigation sources, led to a gradual decline in date cultivation. By the 1980s, a significant number of palm groves had been replaced by new kinds of agricultural activities, including vegetable gardens, nurseries for trees and flowers, poultry production, and dairy farms.

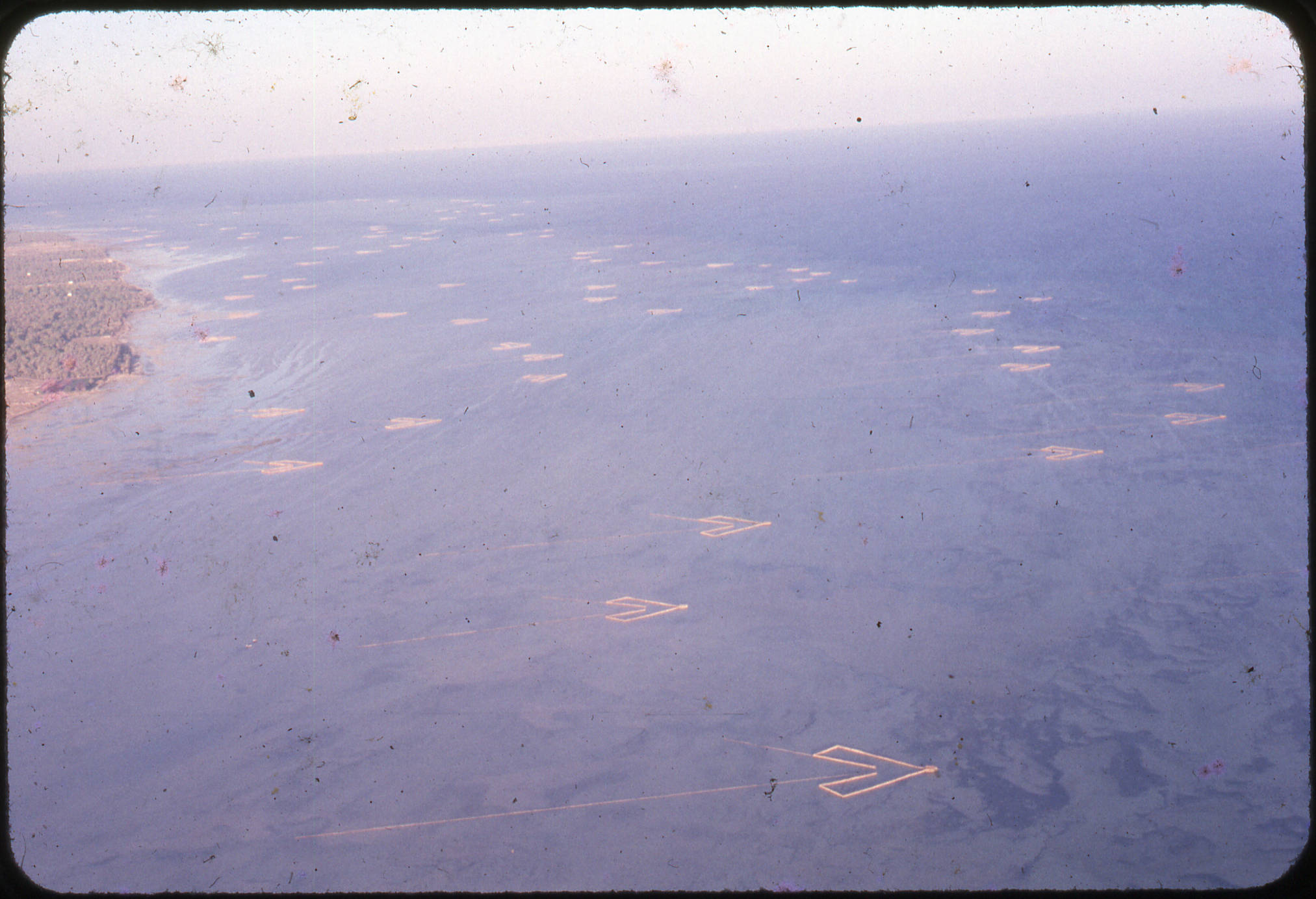
Fish traps in Bahrain, 1961.

The waters surrounding Bahrain traditionally have been rich in more than 200 varieties of fish, many of which constitute a staple of the diet. Before the development of the oil industry, most males engaged in some form of fishing. In addition, the pearl industry constituted one of the most important bases of the island's wealth, and more than 2,000 pearling boats operated during the late 1920s. After 1935 both fishing and pearling as occupations steadily declined. Although the prospect of steady wages attracted many pearl divers to oil-related jobs, pearling was even more adversely affected by the development in Japan of the cultured pearl. By 1953 only twelve pearling boats remained, and these all disappeared within a decade. Fishing declined more gradually, but by the early 1970s fewer than 1,000 fishermen continued to ply their trade. Fewer fishermen meant less fish available in the market despite rising consumer demand, and this situation led to the annual importation of tons of fish to supplement the local catch. In 1981 the government launched a program to revitalize the fishing industry by introducing trawlers, motorizing the traditional dhows, expanding jetties, constructing cold storage facilities, and offering training courses on the use and maintenance of modern fishing equipment. These initiatives contributed to an increase in the total fish catch, which according to estimates of the Food and Agriculture Organization of the United Nations, was 9,200 tons in 1989.

=== Industries ===
Bahrain's other industries include mining natural minerals. Some of the largest companies include Aluminum Bahrain, which operates the Bahrain Aluminum Extrusion Company and the Gulf Aluminum Rolling Mill Company (GARMCO). Other plants include the Arab Iron and Steel Company's iron ore pelletizing plant (4 million tons annually) and a shipbuilding and repair yard.

=== Energy ===
Bahrain electricity production by source

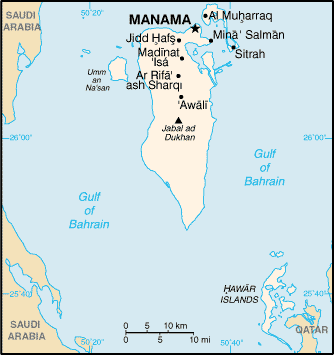
Location

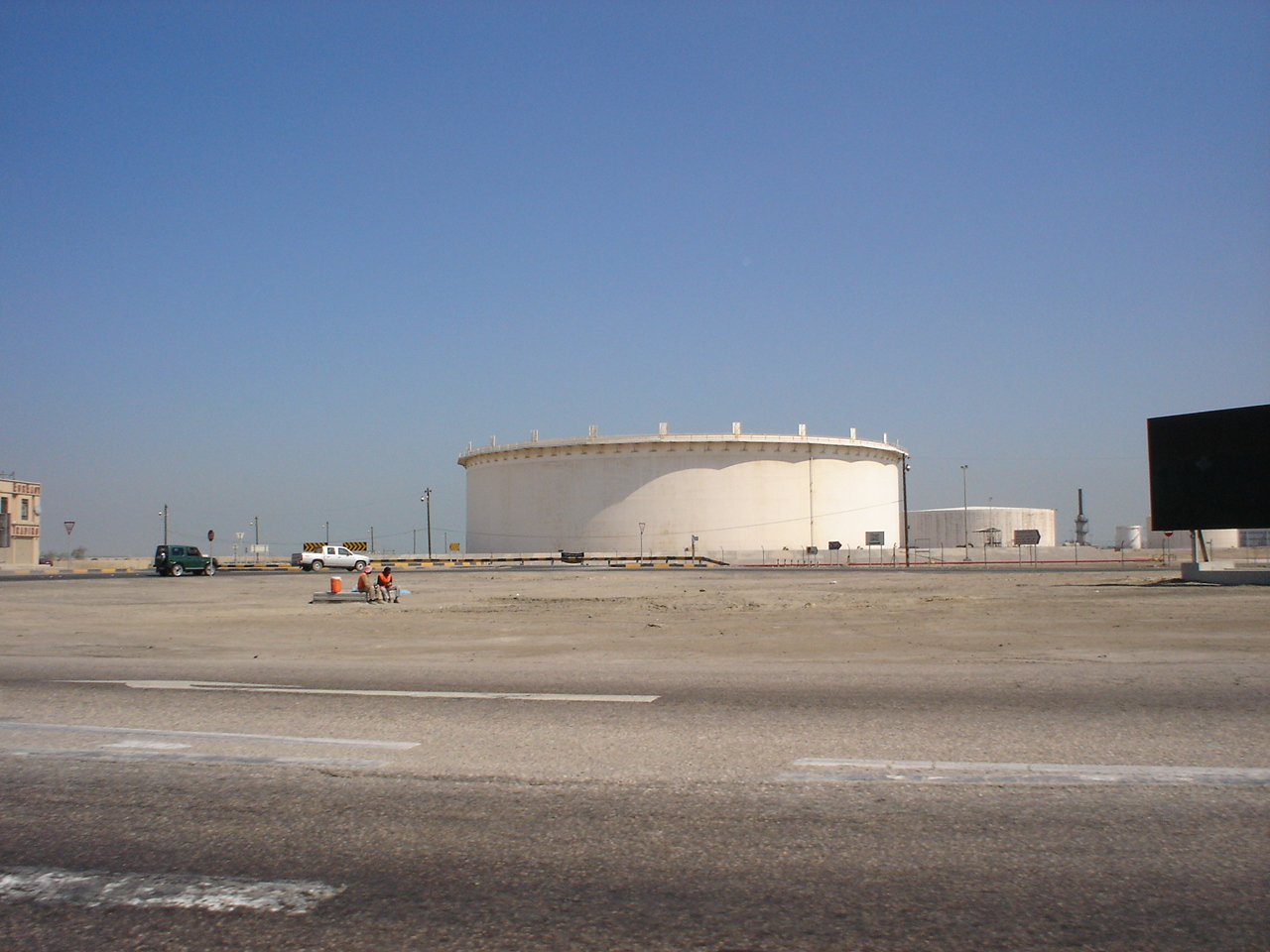
Oil tanks in Sitra, Bahrain

Energy in Bahrain is almost completely derived from fossil fuels. Bahrain is a net energy exporter, but the country's oil and natural gas reserves are declining, while the rate of energy consumption is among the highest in the world. In response, the government is diversifying its economy (and government revenue) from its dependence on fossil fuels, improving its energy efficiency, importing more natural gas and exploring renewable energy.

=== Finance and banking ===
International financial institutions operate in Bahrain, both offshore and onshore, without impediments. In 2001, Bahrain's central bank issued 15 new licenses. More than 100 offshore banking units and representative offices are located in Bahrain, as well as 65 American firms.

=== Education ===
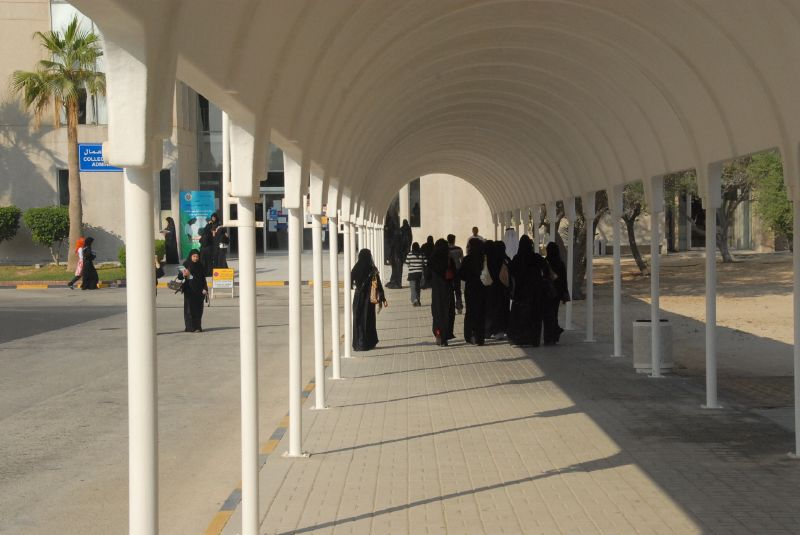
Students at the University of Bahrain

Bahrain has the oldest public education system in the Arabian Peninsula. The system was established in 1932 when the Bahraini government assumed responsibility for operating two pre-existing primary public schools for boys. Subsequently, separate girls' schools and various universities were established in the 20th century. According to data from the 2010 census, the literacy rate of Bahrain stands at 94.6%. As of 2016, education expenditure accounts for 2.7% of Bahrain's GDP.

The Ministry of Education is responsible for education in the country.

=== Healthcare ===
Bahrain has a universal health care system, dating back to 1960. Government-provided health care is free to Bahraini citizens and subsidized for non-Bahrainis. Healthcare expenditure accounted for 4.5% of Bahrain's GDP, according to the World Health Organization. Bahraini physicians and nurses form a majority of the country's workforce in the health sector, unlike neighbouring Gulf states.

=== Real estate ===
The Bahraini government is pursuing an ambitious program of developing 40,000 housing units within the next decade, with close to 20,000 units are under construction. Major housing projects are located in Khalifa City, East Hidd City, East Sitra, and the Naseej project in Northern City. The Ministry of Housing also launched social housing financing programs to support home purchases by Bahraini nationals.

=== Retail ===
Bahrain's retail sector is a fast-growing non-oil industry, generating roughly $1.2B annually and driving over 7% GDP growth. It is defined by modern malls catering to a young population, historic cultural souqs, and a dense network of international supermarket chains.

=== Telecommunications ===
Telecommunications in Bahrain are provided by the Bahrain Telecommunications Company, trading as Batelco, as well as other companies such as Zain and STC.

Prior to 1981 telecommunications services were provided by two separate departments: national services were provided by the Bahrain Telephone Company and international services by Cable & Wireless of the United Kingdom. These were combined in 1981 to form Batelco. Since then, other telecommunications companies have entered the market.

=== Transport ===
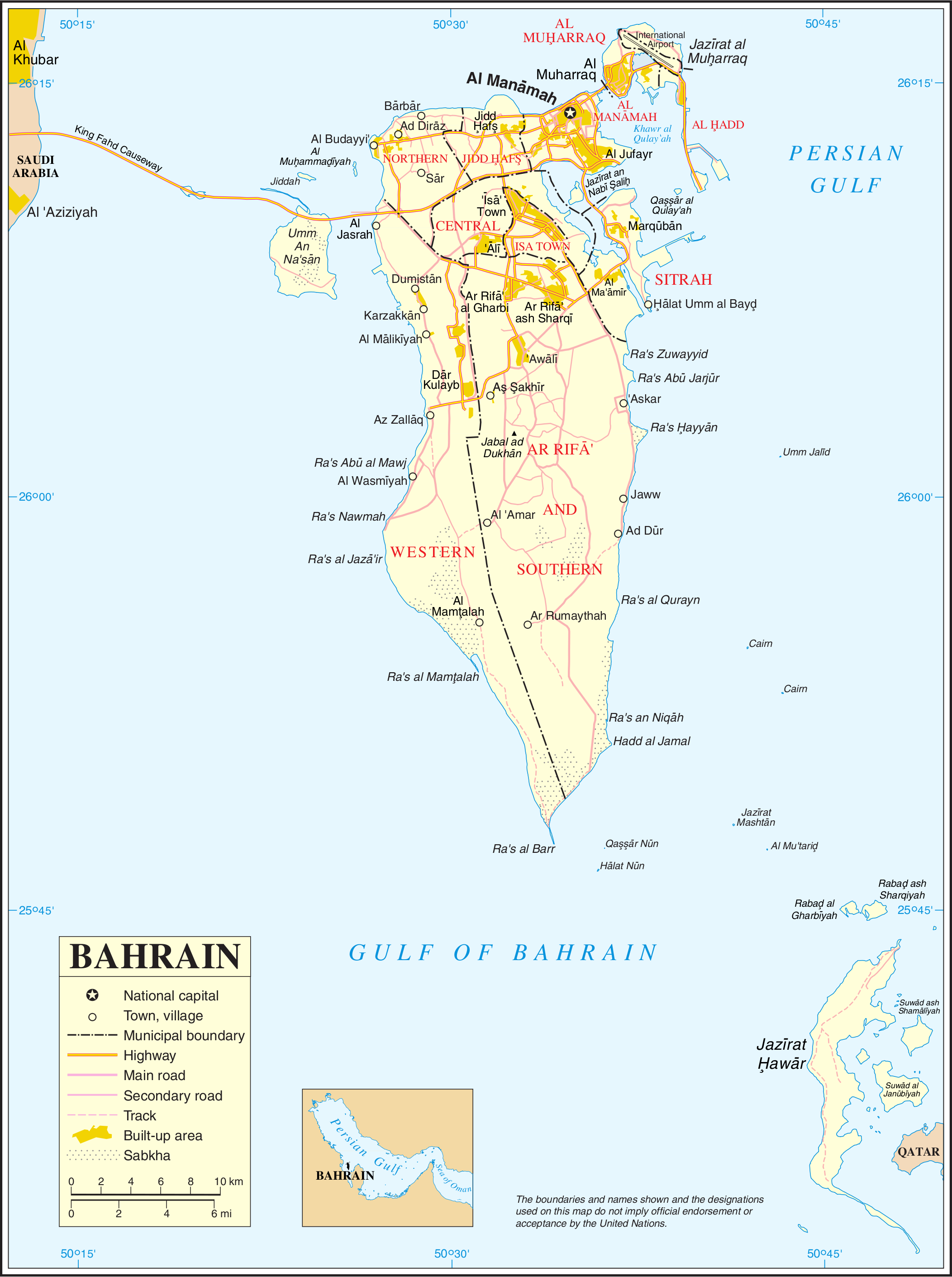
Transport layout of Bahrain

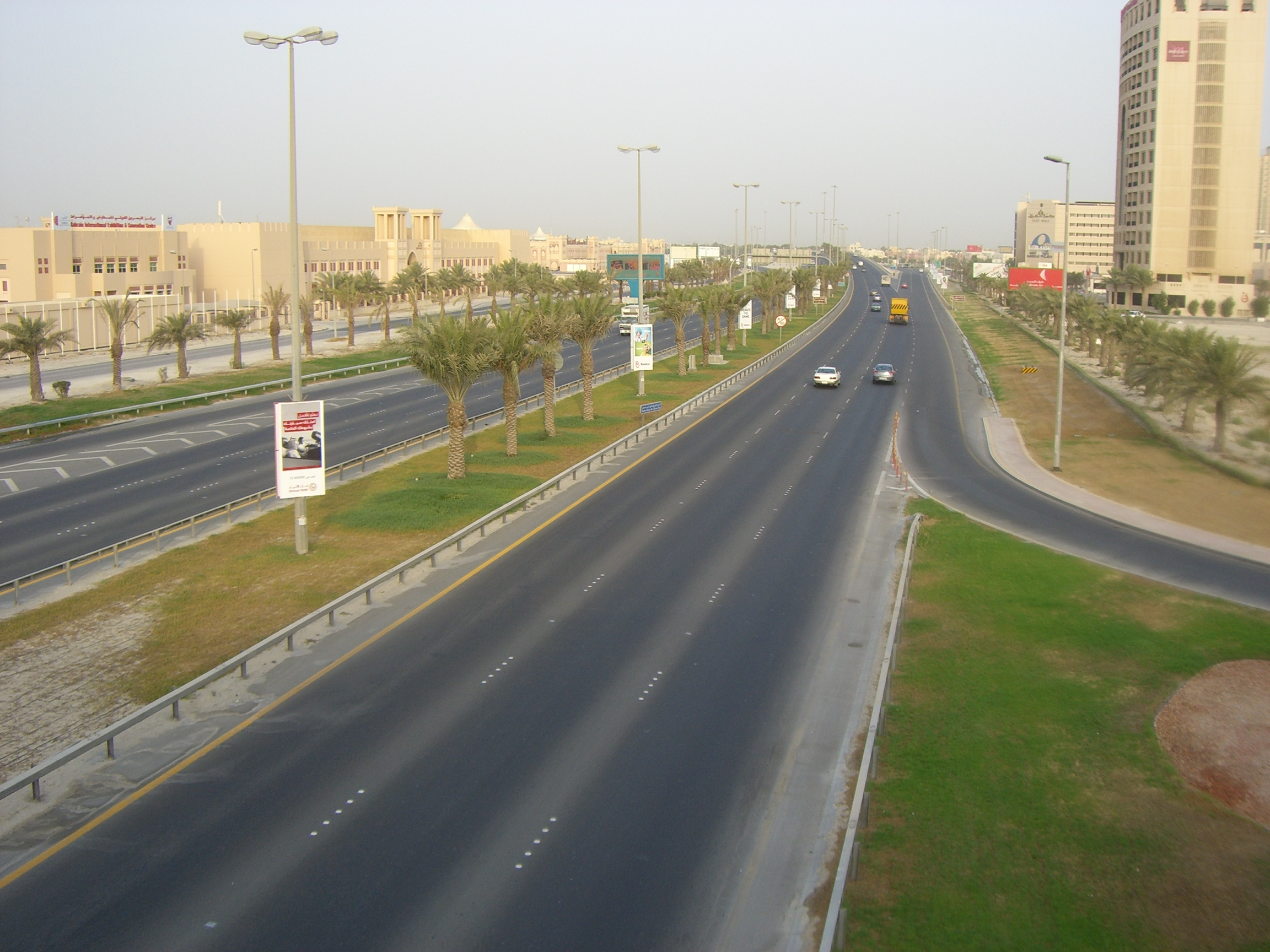
A trunk highway in Manama

Transport in Bahrain encompasses road transportation by car, air transportation and shipping.

The country traditionally had one of the cheapest prices for gasoline, at the equivalent of US$0.21 per litre ($0.78 per gallon) in 2011. Due to massive budgetary deficits and low oil prices, the Bahraini government increased the price of gasoline in 2016–2017 to $0.37 per litre.

=== Tourism ===
Tourism in Bahrain: Bahrain receives four million tourists a year. Most visitors are from Arab states of the Persian Gulf but there are an increasing number of tourists from outside the region.

Tourist arrivals of 2024 in %

== Taxation ==
Taxation and import laws apply equally to domestic and foreign-owned companies. Furthermore foreign investors must comply with the same requirements and legislation as domestic firms.

Oil and gas companies are taxed 46 percent on income derived from the sale of hydrocarbons and derivative products.

Bahrain does not levy a personal income tax. However, individuals employed by a natural person or a legal entity or an enterprise in the Kingdom of Bahrain are subject to contributions to the Social Insurance Organization (SIO) rules in Bahrain.

Employers and workers must pay social insurance contributions as follows:
(1) for old-age, disability and survivor protection: for Bahraini employees, since May 2022, employers pay 14% of salary plus constant allowances, the percentage will rise by 1% each year (up to 20% in 2028), workers pay 7% plus constant allowances; for non-Bahraini employees, employers pay 3% of salary plus constant allowances (then being entitled only to employment injury benefits).
(2) for unemployment insurance: since June 1, 2007, all wages are subject to a 2% tax, paid for equally by the employer and the employee, applicable both to nationals and non-citizens, and supplemented by a government contribution of 1%. This makes Bahrain the first of the GCC countries to implement a UI scheme.

== See also ==
- List of companies of Bahrain
- Corruption in Bahrain
- Tamkeen (Bahrain)
- Bahrain–United States Free Trade Agreement
- General Federation of Workers Trade Unions in Bahrain
- Bahrainization
- Migrant workers in Bahrain
- Mumtalakat Holding Company
- Central Bank of Bahrain
- Ministry of Finance & National Economy (Bahrain)
- Economy of the Middle East
