= Tamkeen =

Tamkeen is Arabic for enablement and empowerment.

- Tamkeen Industrial and Trading Company, also called Tamkeen Group, a business based in Saudi Arabia.
- Tamkeen (Bahrain), a semi-government organisation in Bahrain.
