= Lucien Zeigler =

American entrepreneur and defense investor

- Born: February 18, 1985 (age 41)
- Citizenship: American
- Education: University of Virginia
- Occupations: Entrepreneur, Investor
- Known for: MASNA Ventures, REDSALT, The Twenty30 Podcast

Lucien Zeigler (born 1985) is an American entrepreneur, venture capitalist, and defense industry executive. He is co-founder and General Partner of MASNA Ventures, Saudi Arabia's first defense-focused venture capital firm, and chief executive officer of Redsalt Defense, a U.S.–Saudi defense technology and industrial acceleration platform. He is also the creator and co-host of The Twenty30 Podcast.

== Career ==
Prior to focusing on defense technology, Zeigler led Middle East and North Africa expansion efforts at California-based venture firm Pilatus Capital.

=== REDSALT Defense and SR2 ===
He is chief executive officer and partner of Redsalt Defense, where he focuses on localizing advanced U.S. and allied defense systems into Saudi Arabia through joint ventures and industrial partnerships.

Through Redsalt Defense, he is an executive and co-founder at SR Advanced Strategic Systems (SR2), a U.S.–Saudi joint venture designed to integrate American defense platforms into Saudi manufacturing and operational ecosystems. In May 2026, Zeigler confirmed to Semafor (website) that one of the projects is SKYWASP, the first one-way attack drone to be manufactured in Saudi Arabia, capable of hitting targets up to 1,500 km (930 miles) away.

=== Masna Ventures ===
In 2026, Zeigler co-founded Mansa Ventures with investor Nehal Farooqui. The firm launched with a target of approximately $100 million for its first fund, backing early-stage defense and dual-use technologies (including drone systems, precision-guided munitions, and AI) while supporting localization of manufacturing in Saudi Arabia.

In comments to AGBI, Zeigler described the fund as structured to align venture investment with Saudi Arabia’s defense industrial policy, noting that Saudization requirements are reshaping how foreign defense technology companies approach the Kingdom’s market.

In September 2026, Zeigler told Reuters that MASNA Ventures is anchored by a prominent Saudi family office and sharia-compliant, and has asked the Capital Markets Authority to raise its capacity to $150 million from $100 million.

Masna will be backing SKYWASP and its Riyadh factory.

== Media and Public Engagement ==
Zeigler is the creator and co-host of The Twenty30 Podcast, an English-language program launched in April 2024 that focuses on Saudi Vision 2030 reforms, Saudi Arabia's investment climate, and strategic sectors including defense and advanced technology. The program publishes long form interviews with Saudi "change makers," including business and industry executives, cultural leaders, athletes, and others.

He is a frequent public speaker in Saudi Arabia, participating in economic forums, defense industry summits, and investment conferences where he discusses defense localization, venture capital, and cross-border industrial strategy.
