= Migrant workers in Bahrain =

Migrant workers in Bahrain describe the foreign workers who have moved to Bahrain for work.

== History ==
Bahrain served as a key location on the maritime routes connecting the Fertile Crescent with India for many years. It was also a hub for the international pearl trade and, a regional commerce hub. Its shores have been visited by craftsmen, traders, sailors and soldiers from the Arabian Peninsula, Iran, Mesopotamia, India and, more recently, Europe. In the 1930s, things began to change because of expanding British influence and oil development. By 1941 the proportion of migrants in the population had risen to almost 18%. Large-scale expansions occurred in the trade sector, oil refinery, the construction of communications and other facilities, and a gradual improvement in administration and public services. Τhe earliest employment data appears in the year of 1959. Around 17% of the population, or about a third of the workforce, were migrants. In the 1960s, the rate of increase skyrocketed. An aluminum smelter was built as part of additional industrial growth. Communications and commerce both experienced strong expansion, as did public works, housing, and other services. In 1971 however, situation was differed from 1959 when migrants made up about 18% of the population and made up 38% of the labor. Growth remained slow until 1971, and there were much fewer migrants in the population and labor force than elsewhere. Bahrain saw a rise after 1973 due to increased oil prices. Significantly increased public spending spurred an era of unprecedented growth and structural development. The overall number of migrants has increased by 197% when spouses and dependents are counted.

== Foreign labor ==
Migrant workers come mainly from South and Southeast Asia, Egypt and Jordan. The sector of employment of these workers is in construction, automotive repair, hospitality and domestic service. The Labor Market Regulatory Authority (LMRA) estimate that around 70,000 migrant workers that live in Bahrain are undocumented. The majority of them are Bangladeshi workers. Although the government assert the labor code for the private sector applies to all workers, the International Labor Organization (ILO) and international NGOs noted foreign workers faced discrimination in the workplace. In many cases employers withheld passports, restricted movement, substituted contracts, or did not pay wages. Under the Social Insurance Law of 1976, both Bahrainis and migrants were eligible for pensions. However, later on, the system was changed so that only citizens were eligible for pensions, and both public and private sector employers were required to give their migrant workers end-of-service bonuses. Fear of deportation or employer retaliation prevented many migrant workers from complaining to authorities. Some employers also subjected them to physical and sexual abuse. The Migrant Workers Protection Society (MWPS) at times took in women who were mostly domestic workers. Among them was at least one woman who reported being raped. Victims did not seek legal redress because they could not prove guilt in court without testimony. Even though the government sometimes enforced the law, sexual harassment remained a widespread problem for women, especially migrant women employed as domestic workers and in other low-threshold service occupations. According to the U.S. State Department, working conditions have changed positively. Over the past 15 years, the country has abolished the practice of transporting workers to jobs in open trucks. Bahrain has also introduced the flexi-visa permit, which has given many workers more freedom to work. A recent study has shown that migrant housing conditions across Bahrain are incredibly poor. Reported as being often overcrowded, unmaintained and lacking sanitation. With unregistered accommodations, who primarily house undocumented workers, often lack oversight leading to even worse conditions.

== See also ==
- Bahrainization
