= List of U.S. states by credit rating =

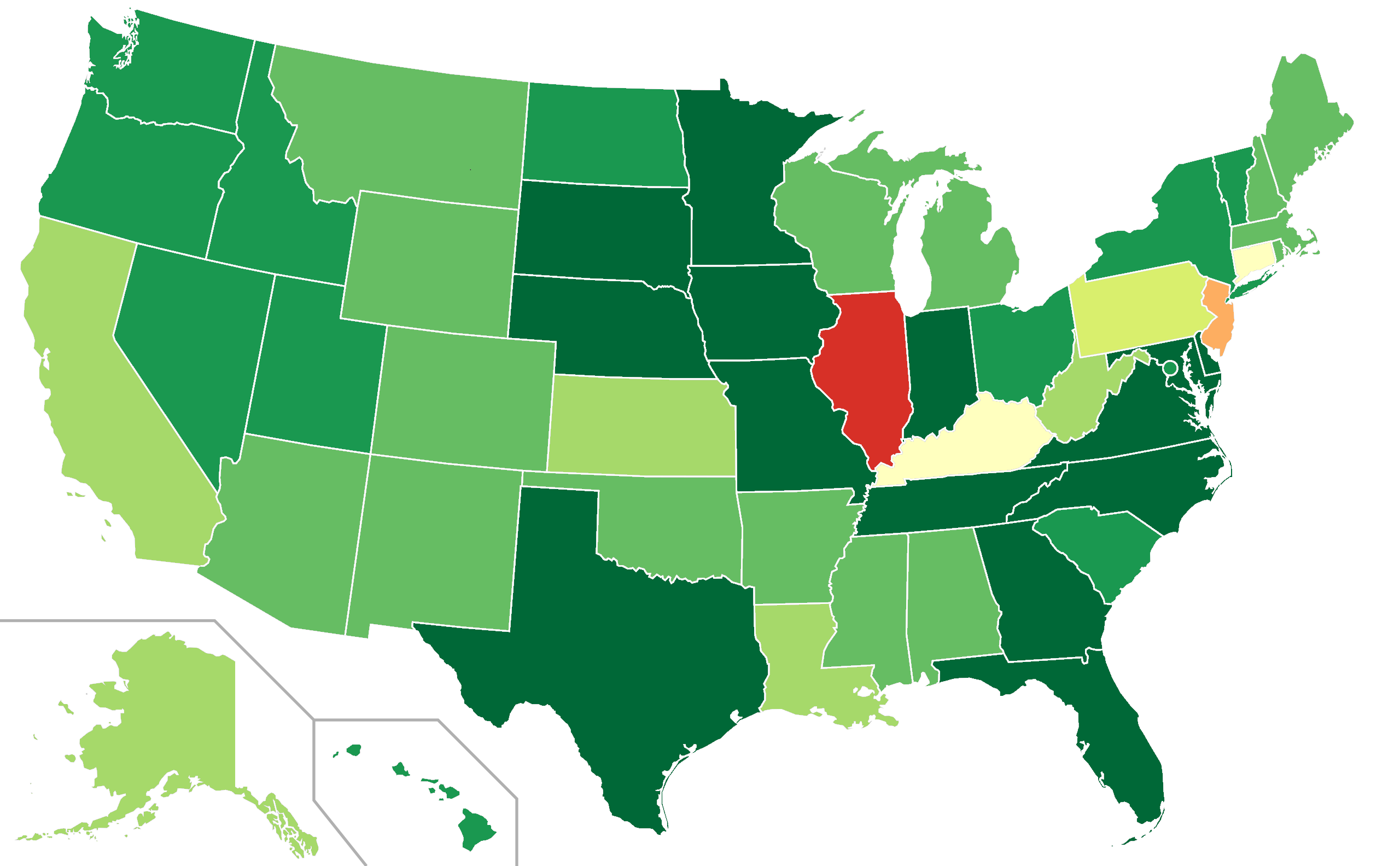
Credit ratings for state debt from S&P Global as of May 2021: AAA AA+ AA AA− A+ A A− BBB+ BBB BBB− and below

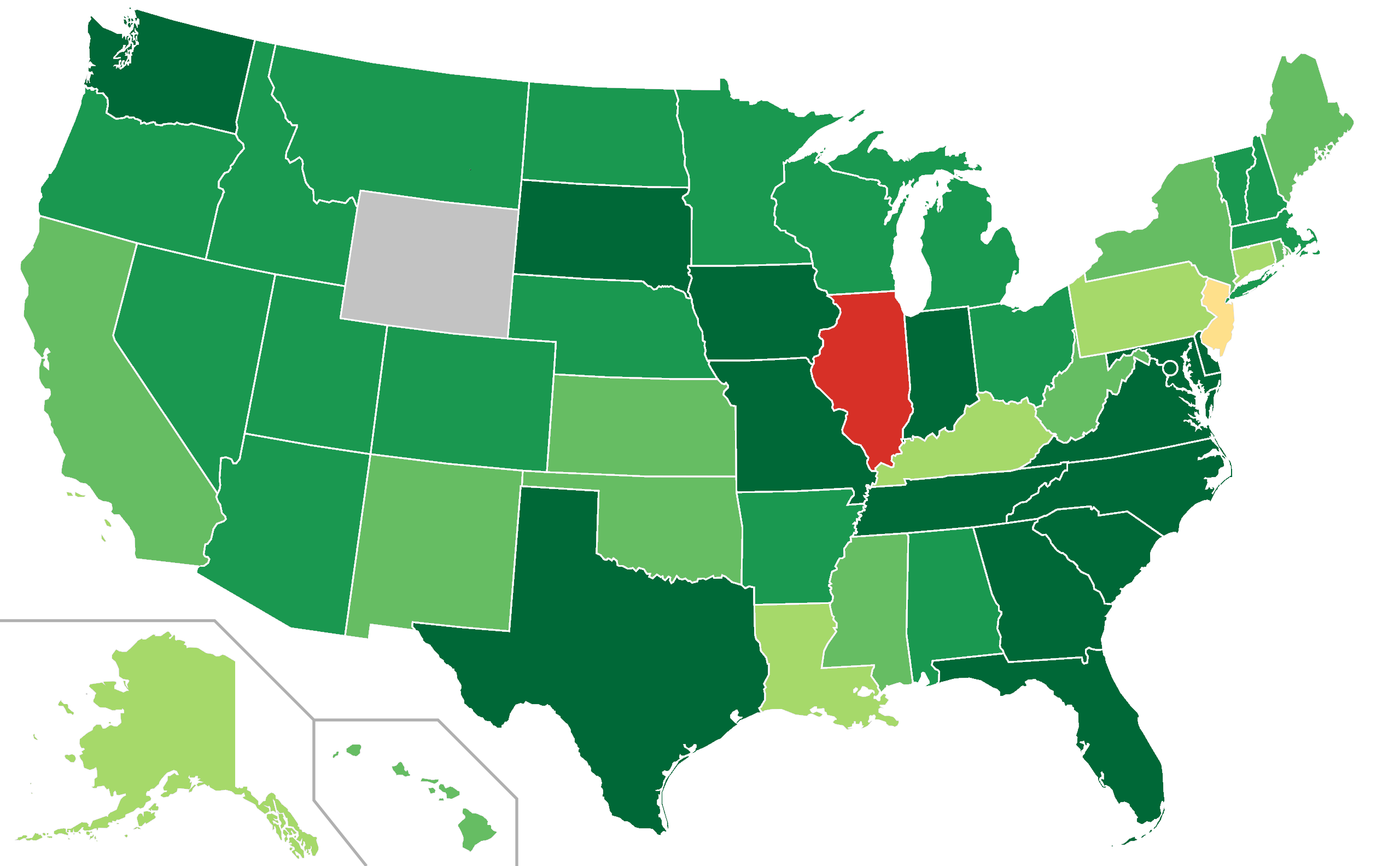
Credit ratings for state debt from Moody's as of May 2021: Aaa Aa1 Aa2 Aa3 A1 A2 A3 Baa1 Baa2 Baa3 and below Not rated

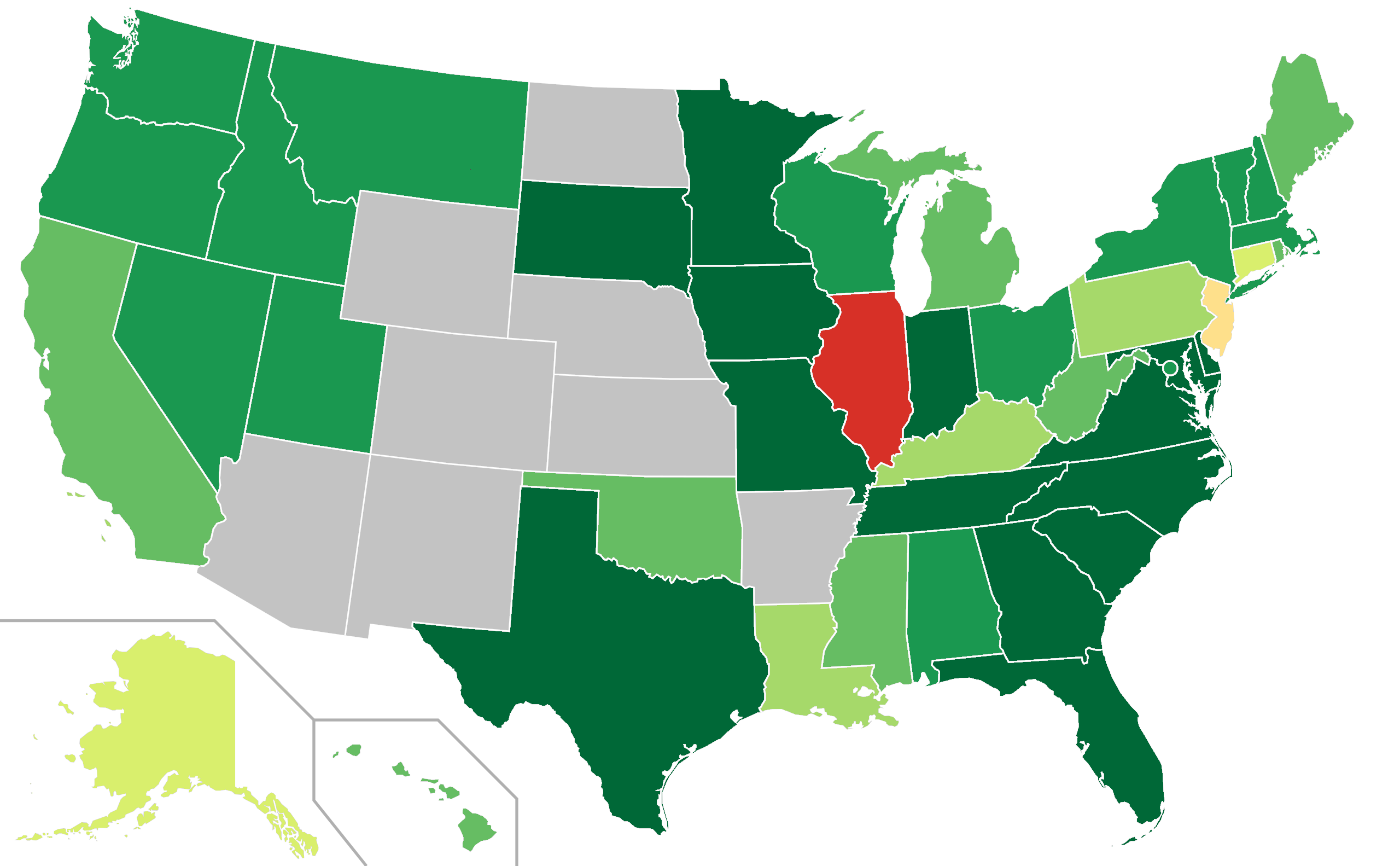
Credit ratings for state debt from Fitch as of May 2021: AAA AA+ AA AA− A+ A A− BBB+ BBB BBB− and below Not rated

This is a list of U.S. states by credit rating, showing credit ratings for sovereign bonds as reported by the three major credit rating agencies: Standard & Poor's, Fitch and Moody's.

== List of general obligation bond rankings ==
State	S&P Global	Moody's	Ref.	Fitch Ratings		
State	S&P Global	Moody's	Ref.	Rating	Date	Ref.
Alabama	AA	Aa1		AA+	May 10, 2022	
Alaska	AA	Aa2		A+	April 13, 2022	
Arizona	AA	Aa1		—N/a		
Arkansas	AA+	Aa1		—N/a		
California	AA−	Aa2		AA	March 1, 2022	
Colorado	AA	Aa1		—N/a		
Connecticut	AA−	Aa2		AA−	May 24, 2022	
Delaware	AAA	Aaa		AAA	February 9, 2022	
District of Columbia	AA+	Aa1		AA+	November 2, 2021	
Florida	AAA	Aaa		AAA	June 23, 2022	
Georgia	AAA	Aaa		AAA	June 6, 2022	
Hawaii	AA+	Aa2		AA	September 17, 2021	
Idaho	AA+	Aaa		AAA	November 4, 2021	
Illinois	A−	A1		A−	November 7, 2023	
Indiana	AAA	Aaa		AAA	September 17, 2021	
Iowa	AAA	Aaa		AAA	December 8, 2021	
Kansas	AA−	Aa2		AA+	September 22, 2026	
Kentucky	A+	Aa2		AA	May 11, 2023	
Louisiana	AA	Aa2		AA−	March 18, 2022	
Maine	AA	Aa1		AA	November 9, 2021	
Maryland	AAA	Aa1		AAA	June 1, 2022	
Massachusetts	AA+	Aa1		AA+	September 10, 2021	
Michigan	AA	Aa1		AA+	July 21, 2022	
Minnesota	AAA	Aaa		AAA	August 5, 2022	
Mississippi	AA	Aa2		AA	November 8, 2021	
Missouri	AAA	Aaa		AAA	October 7, 2021	
Montana	NR	Aa1		AA+	August 26, 2021	
Nebraska	AAA	Aaa		—N/a		
Nevada	AA+	Aa1		AA+	April 20, 2022	
New Hampshire	AA+	Aa1		AA+	March 3, 2022	
New Jersey	A+	Aa3		A+	April 10, 2023	
New Mexico	AA	Aa2		—N/a		
New York	AA+	Aa1		AA+	July 8, 2022	
North Carolina	AAA	Aaa		AAA	July 1, 2022	
North Dakota	AA+	Aa1		—N/a		
Ohio	AAA	Aaa		AAA	August 30, 2023	
Oklahoma	AA+	Aa1		AA	April 21, 2022	
Oregon	AA+	Aa1		AA+	April 29, 2022	
Pennsylvania	A+	Aa2		AA	November 27, 2023	
Rhode Island	AA	Aa2		AA	September 28, 2021	
South Carolina	AA+	Aaa		AAA	June 1, 2022	
South Dakota	AAA	Aaa		AAA	October 13, 2021	
Tennessee	AAA	Aaa		AAA	January 20, 2022	
Texas	AAA	Aaa		AAA	March 24, 2022	
Utah	AAA	Aaa		AAA	April 22, 2022	
Vermont	AA+	Aa1		AA+	April 6, 2022	
Virginia	AAA	Aaa		AAA	June 28, 2022	
Washington	AA+	Aaa		AA+	April 15, 2022	
West Virginia	AA−	Aa2		AA	May 2, 2022	
Wisconsin	AA+	Aa1		AA+	January 10, 2022	
Wyoming	AA+	—N/a		—N/a		

== Historic S&P Global Rankings ==
State	2025	2024	2023	2022	2021	2020	2019	2018	2017	2016	2015	2014	2013	2012	2011	2010	2009	2008	2007	2006	2005	2004	2003	2002	2001
Alabama	AA	AA	AA	AA	AA	AA	AA	AA	AA	AA	AA	AA	AA	AA	AA	AA	AA	AA	AA	AA	AA	AA	AA	AA	AA
Alaska	AA	AA	AA−	AA−	AA−	AA−	AA	AA	AA	AA+	AAA	AAA	AAA	AAA	AA+	AA+	AA+	AA+	AA	AA	AA	AA	AA	NR	NR
Arizona	AA	AA	AA	AA	AA	AA	AA	AA	AA	AA	AA	AA−	AA−	AA−	AA−	AA−	AA−	AA	AA	AA	AA	AA	NR	NR	NR
Arkansas	AA+	AA	AA	AA	AA	AA	AA	AA	AA	AA	AA	AA	AA	AA	AA	AA	AA	AA	AA	AA	AA	AA	AA	AA	AA
California	AA−	AA−	AA−	AA−	AA−	AA−	AA−	AA−	AA−	AA−	AA−	A+	A	A−	A−	A−	A	A+	A+	A+	A	A	BBB	A	A+
Colorado	AA	AA	AA	AA	AA	AA	AA	AA	AA	AA	AA	AA	AA	AA	AA	AA	AA	AA	AA	NR	NR	NR	NR	NR	NR
Connecticut	AA-	AA-	AA-	AA-	A+	A	A	A	A+	AA−	AA	AA	AA	AA	AA	AA	AA	AA	AA	AA	AA	AA	AA	AA	AA
Delaware	AAA	AAA	AAA	AAA	AAA	AAA	AAA	AAA	AAA	AAA	AAA	AAA	AAA	AAA	AAA	AAA	AAA	AAA	AAA	AAA	AAA	AAA	AAA	AAA	AAA
Florida	AAA	AAA	AAA	AAA	AAA	AAA	AAA	AAA	AAA	AAA	AAA	AAA	AAA	AAA	AAA	AAA	AAA	AAA	AAA	AAA	AAA	AA+	AA+	AA+	AA+
Georgia	AAA	AAA	AAA	AAA	AAA	AAA	AAA	AAA	AAA	AAA	AAA	AAA	AAA	AAA	AAA	AAA	AAA	AAA	AAA	AAA	AAA	AAA	AAA	AAA	AAA
Hawaii	AA+	AA+	AA+	AA+	AA+	AA+	AA+	AA+	AA+	AA+	AA	AA	AA	AA	AA	AA	AA	AA	AA	AA−	AA−	AA−	AA−	AA−	AA−
Idaho	AA+	AA+	AA+	AA+	AA+	AA+	AA+	AA+	AA+	AA+	AA+	AA+	AA+	AA+	AA+	AA	AA	AA	AA	NR	NR	NR	NR	NR	NR
Illinois	A-	A-	A-	BBB+	BBB	BBB−	BBB−	BBB−	BBB−	BBB	A−	A−	A−	A	A+	A+	A+	AA	AA	AA	AA	AA	AA	AA	AA
Indiana	AAA	AAA	AAA	AAA	AAA	AAA	AAA	AAA	AAA	AAA	AAA	AAA	AAA	AAA	AAA	AAA	AAA	AAA	AA+	AA+	AA	AA	AA+	AA+	AA+
Iowa	AAA	AAA	AAA	AAA	AAA	AAA	AAA	AAA	AAA	AAA	AAA	AAA	AAA	AAA	AAA	AAA	AAA	AAA	AA+	AA+	AA+	AA+	AA+	AA+	AA+
Kansas	AA−	AA−	AA−	AA−	AA−	AA−	AA−	AA−	AA−	AA−	AA	AA	AA+	AA+	AA+	AA+	AA+	AA+	AA+	AA+	AA+	AA+	AA+	AA+	AA+
Kentucky	A+	A+	A+	A	A	A	A	A	A+	A+	A+	AA−	AA−	AA−	AA−	AA−	AA−	AA−	AA−	AA−	AA−	AA−	AA−	AA−	AA
Louisiana	AA	AA	AA−	AA−	AA−	AA−	AA−	AA−	AA−	AA	AA	AA	AA	AA	AA	AA−	AA−	A+	A	A	A	A+	A+	A	A
Maine	AA	AA	AA	AA	AA	AA	AA	AA	AA	AA	AA	AA	AA	AA	AA	AA	AA	AA	AA	AA−	AA−	AA	AA+	AA+	AA+
Maryland	AAA	AAA	AAA	AAA	AAA	AAA	AAA	AAA	AAA	AAA	AAA	AAA	AAA	AAA	AAA	AAA	AAA	AAA	AAA	AAA	AAA	AAA	AAA	AAA	AAA
Massachusetts	AA+	AA+	AA+	AA	AA	AA	AA	AA	AA	AA+	AA+	AA+	AA+	AA+	AA+	AA	AA	AA	AA	AA	AA	AA−	AA−	AA−	AA−
Michigan	AA	AA	AA	AA	AA	AA	AA	AA	AA−	AA−	AA−	AA−	AA−	AA−	AA−	AA−	AA−	AA−	AA−	AA	AA	AA+	AA+	AAA	AAA
Minnesota	AAA	AAA	AAA	AAA	AAA	AAA	AAA	AAA	AA+	AA+	AA+	AA+	AA+	AA+	AA+	AAA	AAA	AAA	AAA	AAA	AAA	AAA	AAA	AAA	AAA
Mississippi	AA	AA	AA	AA	AA	AA	AA	AA	AA	AA	AA	AA	AA	AA	AA	AA	AA	AA	AA	AA	AA	AA	AA	AA	AA
Missouri	AAA	AAA	AAA	AAA	AAA	AAA	AAA	AAA	AAA	AAA	AAA	AAA	AAA	AAA	AAA	AAA	AAA	AAA	AAA	AAA	AAA	AAA	AAA	AAA	AAA
Montana	NR	NR	NR	AA	AA	AA	AA	AA	AA	AA	AA	AA	AA	AA	AA	AA	AA	AA	AA−	AA−	AA−	AA−	AA−	AA−	AA−
Nebraska	AAA	AAA	AAA	AAA	AAA	AAA	AAA	AAA	AAA	AAA	AAA	AAA	AAA	AAA	AAA	AA+	AA+	AA+	AA+	AA+	AA+	AA+	AA+	AA+	AA+
Nevada	AA+	AA+	AA+	AA+	AA+	AA+	AA+	AA	AA	AA	AA	AA	AA	AA	AA	AA+	AA+	AA+	AA+	AA+	AA	AA	AA	AA	AA
New Hampshire	AA+	AA+	AA	AA	AA	AA	AA	AA	AA	AA	AA	AA	AA	AA	AA	AA	AA	AA	AA	AA	AA	AA	AA	AA+	AA+
New Jersey	A+	A	A	A−	BBB+	BBB+	A−	A−	A−	A-	A	A	AA−	AA−	AA−	AA	AA	AA	AA	AA	AA	AA−	AA	AA	AA+
New Mexico	AA	AA	AA	AA	AA	AA	AA	AA	AA	AA	AA+	AA+	AA+	AA+	AA+	AA+	AA+	AA+	AA+	AA+	AA+	AA+	AA+	AA+	AA+
New York	AA+	AA+	AA+	AA+	AA+	AA+	AA+	AA+	AA+	AA+	AA+	AA+	AA	AA	AA	AA	AA	AA	AA	AA	AA	AA	AA	AA	AA
North Carolina	AAA	AAA	AAA	AAA	AAA	AAA	AAA	AAA	AAA	AAA	AAA	AAA	AAA	AAA	AAA	AAA	AAA	AAA	AAA	AAA	AAA	AAA	AAA	AAA	AAA
North Dakota	AA+	AA+	AA+	AA+	AA+	AA+	AA+	AA+	AA+	AA+	AAA	AAA	AAA	AA+	AA+	AA+	AA+	AA	AA	AA	AA	AA−	AA−	AA−	AA−
Ohio	AAA	AAA	AAA	AA+	AA+	AA+	AA+	AA+	AA+	AA+	AA+	AA+	AA+	AA+	AA+	AA+	AA+	AA+	AA+	AA+	AA+	AA+	AA+	AA+	AA+
Oklahoma	AA+	AA	AA	AA	AA	AA	AA	AA	AA	AA+	AA+	AA+	AA+	AA+	AA+	AA+	AA+	AA+	AA	AA	AA	AA	AA	AA	AA
Oregon	AA+	AA+	AA+	AA+	AA+	AA+	AA+	AA+	AA+	AA+	AA+	AA+	AA+	AA+	AA+	AA	AA	AA	AA	AA−	AA−	AA−	AA−	AA	AA
Pennsylvania	A+	A+	A+	A+	A+	A+	A+	A+	A+	AA−	AA−	AA−	AA	AA	AA	AA	AA	AA	AA	AA	AA	AA	AA	AA	AA
Rhode Island	AA	AA	AA	AA	AA	AA	AA	AA	AA	AA	AA	AA	AA	AA	AA	AA	AA	AA	AA	AA	AA	AA−	AA−	AA−	AA−
South Carolina	AA+	AA+	AA+	AA+	AA+	AA+	AA+	AA+	AA+	AA+	AA+	AA+	AA+	AA+	AA+	AA+	AA+	AA+	AA+	AA+	AA+	AAA	AAA	AAA	AAA
South Dakota	AAA	AAA	AAA	AAA	AAA	AAA	AAA	AAA	AAA	AAA	AAA	AA+	AA+	AA+	AA+	AA	AA	AA	AA	AA	NR	NR	NR	NR	NR
Tennessee	AAA	AAA	AAA	AAA	AAA	AAA	AAA	AAA	AAA	AAA	AA+	AA+	AA+	AA+	AA+	AA+	AA+	AA+	AA+	AA+	AA	AA	AA	AA	AA
Texas	AAA	AAA	AAA	AAA	AAA	AAA	AAA	AAA	AAA	AAA	AAA	AAA	AAA	AA+	AA+	AA+	AA+	AA	AA	AA	AA	AA	AA	AA	AA
Utah	AAA	AAA	AAA	AAA	AAA	AAA	AAA	AAA	AAA	AAA	AAA	AAA	AAA	AAA	AAA	AAA	AAA	AAA	AAA	AAA	AAA	AAA	AAA	AAA	AAA
Vermont	AA+	AA+	AA+	AA+	AA+	AA+	AA+	AA+	AA+	AA+	AA+	AA+	AA+	AA+	AA+	AA+	AA+	AA+	AA+	AA+	AA+	AA+	AA+	AA+	AA+
Virginia	AAA	AAA	AAA	AAA	AAA	AAA	AAA	AAA	AAA	AAA	AAA	AAA	AAA	AAA	AAA	AAA	AAA	AAA	AAA	AAA	AAA	AAA	AAA	AAA	AAA
Washington	AA+	AA+	AA+	AA+	AA+	AA+	AA+	AA+	AA+	AA+	AA+	AA+	AA+	AA+	AA+	AA+	AA+	AA+	AA+	AA	AA	AA	AA+	AA+	AA+
West Virginia	AA−	AA−	AA−	AA−	AA−	AA−	AA−	AA−	AA−	AA−	AA	AA	AA	AA	AA	AA	AA	AA−	AA−	AA−	AA−	AA−	AA−	AA−	AA−
Wisconsin	AA+	AA+	AA+	AA+	AA+	AA	AA	AA	AA	AA	AA	AA	AA	AA	AA	AA	AA	AA	AA−	AA−	AA−	AA−	AA−	AA−	AA
Wyoming	AA+	AA	AA	AA	AA	AA	AA+	AA+	AA+	AAA	AAA	AAA	AAA	AAA	AAA	AA+	AA+	AA+	AA	AA	AA	AA	AA	AA	AA

== See also ==
- List of U.S. state budgets
- List of countries by credit rating
- Illinois pension crisis
