= List of U.S. state budgets =

Credit ratings for state debt from S&P Global as of January 2017: AAA AA+ AA AA− A+ A A− BBB+ BBB

This is a list of U.S. state government budgets as enacted by each state's legislature.

A number of states have a two-year or three year budget (e.g.: Kentucky) while others have a one-year budget (e.g.: Massachusetts). In the table, the fiscal years column lists all of the fiscal years the budget covers and the budget and budget per capita columns show the total for all those years. Note that a fiscal year is named for the calendar year in which it ends, so "2022–23" means two fiscal years: the one ending in calendar year 2022 and the one ending in calendar year 2023.

Figures do not include state-specific federal spending, or transfers of federal funds.

State	Budget (billions $) (Note: Some figures are approximate.)	Annualized	Fiscal years	Reference	Annualized budget per capita (in $)	S&P Credit rating in January 2017
Alabama	12.69	12.69	2025		2,488	AA
Alaska	8.27	8.27	2025		11,282	AA+
Arizona	21.69	21.69	2025		2,931	AA
Arkansas	6.31	6.31	2024		2,100	AA
California	297.86	297.86	2024-25		7,634	AA−
Colorado	27.52	27.52	2024-25		4,688	AA
Connecticut	51.3	25.65	2024-25		7,083	AA−
Delaware	6.07	6.07	2025		5,819	AAA
Florida	78.58	78.58	2024-25		3,476	AAA
Georgia	36.1	36.1	2025		3,281	AAA
Hawaii	26.69	13.34	2024-25		9,296	AA+
Idaho	5.26	5.26	2025		2,683	AA+
Illinois	53.0	53.0	2025		4,226	BBB
Indiana	58.44	29.22	2024-25		3,431	AAA
Iowa	9.74	9.74	2025		3,043	AAA
Kansas	17.3	17.3	2025		5,872	AA−
Kentucky	43.57	21.78	2025-2026		4,840	A+
Louisiana	22.64	22.64	2024-25		4,794	AA
Maine	15.69	7.84	2023-25		5,640	AA
Maryland	38.59	38.59	2025		6,244	AAA
Massachusetts	48.79	48.79	2025		6,970	AA+
Michigan	46.86	46.86	2025		4,686	AA−
Minnesota	84.77	42.38	2024-25		7,891	AA+
Mississippi	7.85	7.85	2025		2,939	AA
Missouri	26.79	26.79	2025		4,391	AAA
Montana	9.37	4.68	2026-27		4,063	AA
Nebraska	22.46	11.23	2026-27		5,700	AAA
Nevada	26.59	13.29	2024-25		4,287	AA
New Hampshire	5.20	5.20	2025		3,714	AA
New Jersey	55.9	55.9	2024		6,017	A−
New Mexico	10.5	10.5	2025		5,004	AA+
New York	132.02	132.02	2025		6,746	AA+
North Carolina	60.5	30.25	2023-24		2,791	AAA
North Dakota	10.50	5.25	2023-25		6,704	AA+
Ohio	95.64	47.82	2024-25		4,087	AA+
Oklahoma	12.59	12.59	2025		3,147	AA+
Oregon	79.17	39.58	2023-25		9,350	AA+
Pennsylvania	53.72	53.72	2024-25		4,164	AA−
Rhode Island	7.29	7.29	2024		6,688	AA
South Carolina	26.3	26.3	2024-25		4,894	AA+
South Dakota	4.06	4.06	2025		4,352	AAA
Tennessee	30.61	30.61	2025		4,299	AAA
Texas	219.40	109.70	2024-25		3,573	AAA
Utah	29.36	29.36	2024		6,129	AAA
Vermont	5.23	5.23	2024		8,083	AA+
Virginia	108.3	54.15	2024-26		6,213	AAA
Washington	116.3	58.15	2023-25		7,443	AA+
West Virginia	9.6	9.6	2025		5,423	AA−
Wisconsin	69.52	34.76	2023-25		5,891	AA
Wyoming	8.32	4.45	2024-25		7,619	AAA

== See also ==
- United States federal budget
- List of countries by government budget
- List of U.S. states by credit rating
