= Tamkeen Industrial and Trading Company =

Tamkeen Industrial and Trading Company, Ltd. is a large, diverse business based in the Kingdom of Saudi Arabia It is a part of the bigger holding company SAUDIA and Saudi Private Aviation owning 53% of Tamkeen. Tamkeen sells technology, medical, and industrial products as well as services and retail merchandizing. Tamkeen has been named in the Saudi 100 Fast Growth List and the ARABIA500 as one of the fastest growing Arab companies in the Arab world and as one of the fastest-growing companies in the Kingdom of Saudi Arabia for multiple years.

Founded in 2001, it has multiple subsidiaries in a wide variety of fields.

- TeQana Precision Engineering, a precision machining facility for industrial energy and water needs
- ExactAir, selling ventilation and environmental control products.
- Testar, producing measurement and inspection instruments.
- Equiptools, providing lubrication systems.
- Chemlinkers, a middleman for specialty chemicals
- Gulf Building Solutions, working on building security systems
- Tamkeen Retail Group, selling jewelry, handbags, fashion and food
- MedArabia, providing technical medical supplies and equipment
