= List of countries by credit rating =

This article contains a list of countries by credit rating, showing long-term foreign currency credit ratings for government bonds as reported by the largest three major credit rating agencies: Standard & Poor's, Fitch, and Moody's. The list also includes all administrative divisions not issuing sovereign bonds, but it excludes regions, provinces and municipalities issuing sub-sovereign bonds.

== Standard & Poor's ==
Map of S&P's sovereign long-term foreign credit ratings as of June 2026. Legend: AAA AA+ AA AA− A+ A A− BBB+ BBB BBB− BB+ BB BB− B+ B B− CCC+ CCC CCC− SD/D

For S&P, a bond is considered investment grade if its credit rating is BBB− or higher. Bonds rated BB+ and below are considered to be speculative grade, sometimes also referred to as "junk" bonds. An SD rating indicates that the country has selectively defaulted on some outstanding obligations.

Country/Territory	Rating	Outlook	Date	Ref.
Albania	BB	Stable	21 March 2025	
Andorra	A−	Stable	10 May 2024	
Angola	B−	Stable	4 February 2022	
Argentina	B−	Stable	10 June 2026	
Armenia	BB−	Stable	25 August 2023	
Aruba	BBB+	Stable	24 March 2025	
Australia	AAA	Stable	16 February 2003	
Austria	AA+	Stable	13 January 2012	
Azerbaijan	BB+	Positive ▲	29 January 2016	
Bahamas	BB−	Stable	26 September 2025	
Bahrain	B	Stable	21 November 2025	
Bangladesh	B+	Stable	30 July 2024	
Barbados	B+	Stable	24 October 2025	
Belgium	AA−	Stable	24 April 2026	
Belize	B−	Stable	9 November 2021	
Benin	BB−	Stable	19 April 2024	
Bermuda	A+	Stable	28 April 2015	
Bolivia	CCC+	Stable	23 March 2026	
Bosnia and Herzegovina	B+	Stable	4 August 2023	
Botswana	BBB	Negative ▼	12 September 2025	
Brazil	BB	Stable	19 December 2023	
Bulgaria	BBB+	Stable	10 July 2025	
Burkina Faso	CCC+	Stable	26 January 2022	
Cabo Verde	B	Positive ▲	16 August 2024	
Cameroon	B−	Stable	22 March 2024	
Canada	AAA	Stable	29 July 2002	
Chad	B−	Stable	28 October 2024	
Chile	A	Stable	24 March 2021	
China	A+	Stable	21 September 2017	
Colombia	BB	Negative ▼	26 June 2025	
Cook Islands	B+	Positive ▲	11 November 2020	
Costa Rica	BB	Stable	22 October 2025	
Côte d'Ivoire	BB	Stable	18 October 2024	
Croatia	A	Stable	14 March 2026	
Curacao	BBB−	Stable	22 February 2022	
Cyprus	A−	Positive ▲	20 March 2026	
Czech Republic	AA−	Stable	28 March 2025	
Democratic Republic of the Congo	B−	Stable	28 January 2022	
Denmark	AAA	Stable	6 February 2026	
Dominican Republic	BB	Stable	19 December 2022	
Ecuador	B−	Stable	1 September 2020	
Egypt	B	Stable	10 October 2025	
El Salvador	B−	Stable	7 November 2023	
Estonia	A+	Stable	31 May 2024	
Ethiopia	SD		15 December 2023	
Falkland Islands	A+	Stable	22 September 2021	
Fiji	B+	Stable	22 September 2021	
Finland	AA+	Stable	10 October 2014	
France	A+	Negative ▼	17 October 2025	
Georgia	BB	Stable	11 October 2019	
Germany	AAA	Stable	17 August 1983	
Ghana	B−	Stable	7 November 2025	
Greece	BBB	Stable	18 April 2025	
Guatemala	BB+	Stable	23 May 2025	
Guernsey	A+	Stable	13 January 2023	
Guinea	B+	Stable	18 September 2025	
Honduras	BB−	Negative ▼	19 July 2017	
Hong Kong	AA+	Stable	22 September 2017	
Hungary	BBB−	Negative ▼	11 April 2025	
Iceland	A+	Positive ▲	6 March 2026	
India	BBB	Stable	14 August 2025	
Indonesia	BBB	Stable	31 May 2019	
Iraq	B−	Stable	3 September 2015	
Ireland	AA+	Stable	20 March 2026	
Israel	A	Stable	1 October 2024	
Italy	BBB+	Stable	11 April 2025	
Jamaica	BB	Stable	25 September 2025	
Japan	A+	Stable	16 September 2015	
Jersey	AA−	Stable	16 January 2021	
Jordan	BB−	Stable	6 September 2024	
Kazakhstan	BBB	Positive ▲	21 August 2026	
Kenya	B	Stable	22 August 2025	
Kuwait	AA−	Stable	21 November 2025	
Kyrgyzstan	B+	Stable	28 March 2025	
Laos	CCC+	Positive ▲	23 October 2025	
Latvia	A	Stable	31 May 2024	
Lebanon	SD		11 March 2020	
Liechtenstein	AAA	Stable	2 December 1996	
Lithuania	A	Stable	31 May 2024	
Luxembourg	AAA	Stable	28 April 1994	
Madagascar	B−	Negative ▼	11 April 2022	
Malaysia	A−	Stable	19 September 2025	
Malta	A−	Stable	14 October 2016	
Mauritius	BBB−	Stable	21 July 2023	
Mexico	BBB	Stable	26 March 2020	
Moldova	BB−	Stable	10 October 2025	
Mongolia	BB−	Stable	30 October 2025	
Montenegro	B+	Stable	30 August 2024	
Montserrat	BBB−	Stable	2 September 2011	
Morocco	BBB−	Stable	26 September 2025	
Mozambique	CCC+	Negative ▼	22 November 2019	
Netherlands	AAA	Stable	20 November 2015	
New Zealand	AA+	Stable	21 February 2021	
Nicaragua	B+	Stable	23 October 2024	
Nigeria	B−	Positive ▲	26 March 2020	
North Macedonia	BB−	Stable	24 May 2013	
Norway	AAA	Stable	9 July 1975	
Oman	BBB−	Stable	27 September 2024	
Pakistan	B−	Stable	24 July 2025	
Panama	BBB−	Stable	26 November 2024	
Papua New Guinea	B−	Stable	29 April 2020	
Paraguay	BBB−	Stable	17 December 2025	
Peru	BBB−	Stable	25 April 2024	
Philippines	BBB+	Positive ▲	30 April 2019	
Poland	A−	Stable	12 October 2018	
Portugal	A+	Stable	29 August 2025	
Qatar	AA	Stable	4 November 2022	
Republic of the Congo	CCC+	Stable	30 October 2024	
Romania	BBB−	Negative ▼	16 May 2014	
Rwanda	B+	Stable	9 August 2019	
Saint Helena	BBB−	Stable	31 March 2023	
San Marino	BBB+	Stable	1 August 2025	
Saudi Arabia	A+	Stable	14 March 2025	
Senegal	CCC+		14 November 2025	
Serbia	BBB−	Stable	4 October 2024	
Singapore	AAA	Stable	6 March 1995	
Slovakia	A	Negative ▼	24 April 2026	
Slovenia	AA	Stable	6 June 2025	
South Africa	BB	Positive ▲	14 November 2025	
South Korea	AA	Stable	8 August 2016	
Spain	A+	Stable	12 September 2025	
Sri Lanka	CCC+	Stable	19 September 2025	
Suriname	CCC+	Stable	6 December 2023	
Sweden	AAA	Stable	16 February 2004	
Switzerland	AAA	Stable	1 October 1988	
Taiwan	AA+	Stable	29 April 2022	
Tajikistan	B	Stable	16 August 2024	
Thailand	BBB+	Stable	26 August 2004	
Togo	B+	Stable	18 April 2025	
Trinidad and Tobago	BBB−	Negative ▼	26 March 2020	
Turkey	BB−	Stable	1 November 2024	
Turks and Caicos Islands	A−	Stable	26 February 2025	
Uganda	B−	Positive ▲	6 October 2023	
Ukraine	CCC+	Stable	22 January 2026	
United Arab Emirates	AA	Stable	2 July 2007	
United Kingdom	AA	Stable	27 June 2016	
United States	AA+	Stable	5 August 2011	
Uruguay	BBB+	Stable	26 April 2023	
Uzbekistan	BB	Stable	22 May 2026	
Vietnam	BB+	Stable	26 May 2022	
Zambia	CCC+	Stable	21 November 2025	

== Fitch ==
Map of Fitch's sovereign long-term foreign credit ratings. Legend: AAA AA+ AA AA− A+ A A− BBB+ BBB BBB− BB+ BB BB− B+ B B− CCC+ CCC CCC− RD

For Fitch, a bond is considered investment grade if its credit rating is BBB− or higher. Bonds rated BB+ and below are considered to be speculative grade, sometimes also referred to as "junk" bonds. Fitch Ratings typically does not assign outlooks to sovereign ratings below B− (CCC and lower) or modifiers. CCC indicates 'Substantial Credit Risk' where 'default is a real possibility'. CC indicates 'Very High Levels of Credit Risk' where 'default of some kind appears probable'.

Country/Territory	Rating	Outlook	Date	Ref.
Andorra	A−	Stable	18 September 2026	
Angola	B−	Stable	8 May 2026	
Argentina	B−	Stable	5 May 2026	
Armenia	BB−	Positive ▲	10 July 2026	
Aruba	BBB	Positive ▲	3 March 2026	
Australia	AAA	Stable	9 October 2026	
Austria	AA	Stable	5 December 2025	
Azerbaijan	BBB−	Stable	13 June 2025	
Bahamas	BB−	Stable	9 April 2025	
Bahrain	B	Stable	23 February 2026	
Bangladesh	B+	Stable	22 May 2025	
Barbados	B+	Positive ▲	9 October 2025	
Belarus	WD	Ratings withdrawn	6 October 2023	
Belgium	A+	Stable	13 June 2025	
Benin	B+	Positive ▲	16 January 2026	
Bolivia	CCC		16 January 2026	
Brazil	BB	Stable	25 June 2025	
Bulgaria	BBB+	Stable	10 July 2025	
Cabo Verde	B	Stable	13 May 2025	
Cameroon	B	Negative ▼	7 November 2025	
Canada	AA+	Stable	18 July 2025	
Chile	A−	Stable	26 September 2025	
China	A	Stable	3 April 2025	
Colombia	BB	Stable	16 December 2025	
Costa Rica	BB	Positive ▲	17 December 2025	
Côte d'Ivoire	BB	Stable	12 December 2025	
Croatia	A−	Stable	6 March 2026	
Cyprus	A−	Positive ▲	21 November 2025	
Czech Republic	AA−	Stable	6 February 2026	
Denmark	AAA	Stable	3 October 2025	
Dominican Republic	BB−	Positive ▲	7 November 2025	
Ecuador	B−	Stable	25 February 2026	
Egypt	B	Stable	10 October 2025	
El Salvador	B−	Stable	30 April 2025	
Estonia	A+	Stable	6 June 2025	
Ethiopia	RD		16 October 2026	
European Union	AAA	Stable	30 January 2026	
Finland	AA	Stable	25 July 2025	
France	A+	Negative ▼	30 October 2026	
Gabon	CCC-		19 December 2025	
Georgia	BB	Stable	21 November 2025	
Germany	AAA	Stable	11 July 2025	
Ghana	B−	Stable	16 June 2025	
Greece	BBB	Stable	14 November 2025	
Guatemala	BB+	Stable	14 October 2025	
Hong Kong	AA−	Stable	23 May 2025	
Hungary	BBB	Negative ▼	5 December 2025	
Iceland	WD	Ratings withdrawn	6 February 2026	
India	BBB−	Stable	25 August 2025	
Indonesia	BBB	Negative ▼	4 March 2026	
Iraq	B−	Stable	24 November 2025	
Ireland	AA	Stable	7 November 2025	
Israel	A	Negative ▼	31 March 2025	
Italy	BBB+	Stable	19 September 2025	
Jamaica	BB−	Stable	5 February 2026	
Japan	A	Stable	19 January 2026	
Jordan	BB−	Stable	7 May 2025	
Kazakhstan	BBB	Stable	15 July 2025	
Kenya	B−	Stable	23 January 2026	
Kosovo	BB−	Stable	6 January 2026	
Kuwait	AA−	Stable	5 September 2025	
Kyrgyzstan	B	Stable	24 April 2025	
Laos	CCC+		21 October 2025	
Latvia	A−	Stable	7 November 2025	
Lebanon	WD	Ratings withdrawn	23 July 2023	
Lesotho	B	Stable	9 June 2025	
Lithuania	A	Stable	24 October 2025	
Luxembourg	AAA	Stable	31 October 2025	
Macao	AA	Stable	11 February 2026	
Malaysia	BBB+	Stable	8 December 2025	
Maldives	CC		12 June 2025	
Malta	A+	Stable	5 September 2025	
Mexico	BBB−	Stable	16 April 2025	
Moldova	B+	Stable	27 February 2026	
Mongolia	B+	Stable	1 September 2025	
Morocco	BB+	Stable	17 September 2026	
Mozambique	CCC		30 January 2025	
Namibia	BB−	Stable	21 November 2025	
Nepal	BB−	Stable	18 November 2025	
Netherlands	AAA	Stable	16 January 2026	
New Zealand	AA+	Stable	17 August 2025	
Nicaragua	B	Stable	23 May 2025	
Nigeria	B	Positive ▲	9 October 2026	
North Macedonia	BB+	Stable	19 September 2025	
Norway	AAA	Stable	13 March 1995	
Oman	BBB−	Stable	8 December 2025	
Pakistan	B−	Stable	15 April 2025	
Panama	BB+	Stable	28 March 2024	
Paraguay	BB+	Positive ▲	6 October 2025	
Peru	BBB	Stable	20 October 2022	
Philippines	BBB	Stable	22 May 2023	
Poland	A−	Negative ▼	5 September 2025	
Portugal	A	Stable	12 September 2025	
Qatar	AA	Stable	20 March 2024	
Ras Al Khaimah, UAE	A+	Stable	23 May 2023	
Republic of the Congo	CCC+		16 September 2022	
Romania	BBB−	Negative ▼	17 December 2024	
Russia	WD	Ratings withdrawn	25 March 2022	
Rwanda	B+	Negative ▼	4 April 2025	
San Marino	BBB−	Positive ▲	12 December 2025	
Saudi Arabia	A+	Stable	5 April 2023	
Serbia	BB+	Positive ▲	9 August 2024	
Seychelles	BB	Stable	5 September 2025	
Singapore	AAA	Stable	14 May 2003	
Slovakia	A−	Stable	6 December 2024	
Slovenia	A+	Stable	3 October 2025	
South Africa	BB−	Stable	15 December 2021	
South Korea	AA−	Stable	6 September 2012	
Spain	A	Stable	26 September 2025	
Sri Lanka	B−	Stable	22 September 2026	
Suriname	WD	Ratings withdrawn	25 January 2022	
Sweden	AAA	Stable	8 March 2004	
Switzerland	AAA	Stable	10 August 1994	
Taiwan	AA	Stable	10 September 2021	
Tanzania	B+	Stable	9 June 2023	
Thailand	BBB+	Negative ▼	24 September 2025	
Tunisia	B−	Stable	12 September 2025	
Turkey	BB−	Stable	6 September 2024	
Turkmenistan	BB−	Stable	2 August 2024	
Uganda	B	Stable	30 August 2024	
Ukraine	CCC		22 December 2025	
United Arab Emirates	AA−	Stable	11 November 2020	
United Kingdom	AA−	Stable	22 March 2024	
United States	AA+	Stable	1 August 2023	
Uruguay	BBB	Stable	7 June 2023	
Uzbekistan	BB	Positive ▲	3 June 2026	
Vietnam	BB+	Stable	8 December 2023	
Zambia	B−	Stable	28 November 2025	

== Moody's ==
Map of Moody's sovereign long-term foreign credit ratings. Legend: Aaa Aa1 Aa2 Aa3 A1 A2 A3 Baa1 Baa2 Baa3 Ba1 Ba2 Ba3 B1 B2 B3 Caa1 Caa2 Caa3 Ca C

For Moody's, a bond is considered investment grade if its credit rating is Baa3 or higher. Bonds rated Ba1 and below are considered to be speculative grade, sometimes also referred to as "junk" bonds.

Country/Territory	Rating	Outlook	Date	Ref.
Angola	B3	Positive ▲	24 October 2023	
Albania	Ba3	Stable	19 October 2024	
Argentina	B3	Positive ▲	21 July 2026	
Armenia	Ba3	Stable	22 June 2023	
Australia	Aaa	Stable	28 June 2022	
Austria	Aa1	Stable	24 February 2023	
Azerbaijan	Ba1	Stable	5 August 2022	
Bahamas	B1	Stable	6 October 2022	
Bahrain	B2	Stable	22 April 2022	
Bangladesh	B2	Stable	16 Sep 2026	
Barbados	B3	Stable	3 August 2023	
Belarus	C	Stable	2 June 2023	
Belgium	A1	Stable	17 April 2026	
Belize	Caa2	Stable	16 November 2022	
Benin	B1	Stable	18 September 2023	
Bermuda	A2	Stable	21 June 2022	
Bolivia	Caa1	Negative ▼	30 June 2023	
Bosnia and Herzegovina	B3	Stable	22 July 2022	
Botswana	A3	Stable	27 October 2023	
Brazil	Ba1	Positive ▲	7 October 2024	
Bulgaria	Baa1	Stable	3 February 2023	
Cambodia	B2	Negative ▼	15 November 2022	
Cameroon	Caa1	Stable	27 July 2023	
Canada	Aaa	Stable	3 November 2022	
Cayman Islands	Aa3	Stable	8 June 2023	
Chile	A2	Stable	15 September 2022	
China	A1	Stable	27 April 2026	
Colombia	Baa2	Stable	8 June 2023	
Congo	Caa2	Stable	3 November 2023	
Costa Rica	Ba3	Positive ▲	18 September 2024	
Cote d'Ivoire	Ba3	Positive ▲	27 June 2022	
Croatia	A3	Stable	7 November 2024	
Cuba	WD	Ratings withdrawn ▼	18 November 2021	
Cyprus	A3	Stable	22 November 2024	
Czech Republic	Aa3	Stable	24 November 2023	
Denmark	Aaa	Stable	11 February 2022	
Dominican Republic	Ba3	Positive ▲	10 August 2023	
DR Congo	B3	Stable	11 November 2022	
Ecuador	Caa3	Stable	27 February 2023	
Egypt	Caa1	Negative ▼	18 January 2024	
El Salvador	B3	Stable	26 November 2024	
Estonia	A1	Stable	29 April 2022	
Eswatini	B3	Positive ▲	1 December 2023	
Ethiopia	Caa3	Stable	15 September 2023	
Fiji	B1	Stable	7 October 2022	
Finland	Aa1	Stable	29 July 2022	
France	Aa3	Stable	14 December 2024	
Gabon	Caa1	Negative ▼	12 September 2023	
Georgia	Ba2	Negative ▼	28 April 2022	
Germany	Aaa	Stable	10 February 2023	
Ghana	Caa3	Stable	9 June 2023	
Greece	Baa3	Positive ▲	18 September 2026	
Guatemala	Ba1	Stable	15 June 2022	
Honduras	B1	Stable	3 October 2023	
Hong Kong	Aa3	Negative ▼	6 December 2023	
Hungary	Ba1	Negative ▼	30 December 2025	
Iceland	A1	Stable	19 September 2024	
India	Baa3	Stable	18 August 2023	
Indonesia	Baa2	Negative ▼	5 February 2026	
Iraq	Caa1	Stable	24 November 2023	
Ireland	Aa3	Stable	21 April 2023	
Isle of Man	Aa3	Stable	27 October 2023	
Israel	Baa1	Negative ▼	27 September 2024	
Italy	Baa2	Stable	21 November 2025	
Jamaica	B1	Positive ▲	18 October 2023	
Japan	A1	Stable	8 November 2023	
Jordan	B1	Positive ▲	17 November 2022	
Kazakhstan	Baa1	Positive ▲	9 September 2024	
Kenya	B3	Negative ▼	28 July 2023	
Kuwait	A1	Stable	26 May 2022	
Kyrgyzstan	B3	Negative ▼	17 October 2022	
Latvia	A3	Stable	29 April 2022	
Lebanon	C	Stable	13 December 2023	
Lithuania	A2	Stable	29 April 2022	
Luxembourg	Aaa	Stable	17 March 2023	
Macao	Aa3	Negative ▼	6 December 2022	
Malaysia	A3	Stable	14 April 2023	
Maldives	Caa2	Stable	11 September 2024	
Mali	Caa2	Stable	9 September 2022	
Malta	A2	Stable	18 November 2022	
Mauritius	Baa3	Stable	28 July 2022	
Mexico	Baa2	Stable	8 July 2022	
Moldova	B2	Stable	3 April 2026	
Mongolia	B3	Stable	14 February 2023	
Montenegro	Ba3	Stable	27 September 2024	
Morocco	Ba1	Positive ▲	6 March 2026	
Mozambique	Caa2	Stable	22 September 2023	
Namibia	B1	Stable	5 April 2022	
Netherlands	Aaa	Stable	27 January 2023	
New Zealand	Aaa	Stable	21 April 2022	
Nicaragua	B3	Stable	30 March 2022	
Nigeria	Caa1	Positive ▲	8 December 2023	
Norway	Aaa	Stable	6 May 2022	
Oman	Baa3	Stable	7 December 2023	
Pakistan	Caa1	Positive ▲	13 August 2025	
Panama	Baa3	Stable	31 October 2023	
Papua New Guinea	B2	Stable	10 November 2022	
Paraguay	Baa3	Stable	26 July 2024	
Peru	Baa1	Negative ▼	31 January 2023	
Philippines	Baa2	Stable	15 September 2022	
Poland	A2	Stable	29 April 2022	
Portugal	A3	Stable	17 November 2023	
Qatar	Aa3	Positive ▲	2 November 2022	
Romania	Baa3	Stable	3 November 2023	
Russia	WD	Ratings withdrawn ▼	6 March 2022	
Rwanda	B2	Stable	8 September 2023	
Saint Vincent and the Grenadines	B3	Stable	1 March 2022	
Saudi Arabia	Aa3	Stable	22 November 2024	
Senegal	Ba3	Stable	18 March 2022	
Serbia	Ba2	Stable	8 September 2023	
Singapore	Aaa	Stable	17 May 2022	
Slovakia	A3	Stable	13 December 2024	
Slovenia	A2	Stable	27 February 2026	
South Africa	Ba2	Stable	1 April 2022	
South Korea	Aa2	Stable	21 April 2022	
Spain	A3	Positive ▲	27 September 2025	
Sri Lanka	Caa1	Positive ▲	23 December 2024	
Suriname	Caa3	Stable	17 February 2023	
Sweden	Aaa	Stable	25 March 2022	
Switzerland	Aaa	Stable	17 February 2023	
Taiwan	Aa3	Stable	22 September 2022	
Tajikistan	B3	Stable	12 October 2023	
Thailand	Baa1	Stable	7 April 2022	
Trinidad and Tobago	Ba2	Positive ▲	10 July 2023	
Tunisia	Caa1	Stable	28 February 2025	
Turkey	B1	Positive ▲	19 July 2024	
Uganda	B2	Negative ▼	18 November 2022	
Ukraine	Ca	Stable	10 February 2023	
United Arab Emirates	Aa2	Stable	21 March 2023	
United Kingdom	Aa3	Stable	20 October 2023	
United States	Aa1	Stable	16 May 2025	
Uruguay	Baa1	Stable	15 March 2024	
Uzbekistan	Ba2	Stable	25 June 2026	
Venezuela	C	Ratings withdrawn ▼	9 March 2018	
Vietnam	Ba2	Stable	6 September 2022	
Zambia	Caa3	Stable	21 October 2022	

== Others ==
=== DBRS Morningstar ===
For DBRS Morningstar, a bond is considered investment grade if its credit rating is BBB(low) or higher. Bonds rated BB(high) and below are considered to be speculative grade, sometimes also referred to as "junk" bonds.

Country	Rating	Outlook	Date
Argentina	B−	Stable	21 November 2025
Australia	AAA	Stable	20 January 2023
Austria	AA(high)	Stable	5 June 2026
Belgium	AA	Stable	4 August 2023
Brazil	BB	Stable	28 July 2023
Bulgaria	BBB(high)	Stable	2 May 2025
Canada	AAA	Stable	8 September 2023
China	A	Stable	9 November 2023
Colombia	BBB(low)	Stable	26 June 2023
Croatia	A	Stable	25 April 2025
Cyprus	A(low)	Positive ▲	21 March 2025
Denmark	AAA	Stable	17 November 2023
Estonia	AA(low)	Stable	21 July 2023
European Union	AAA	Stable	25 May 2025
Finland	AA(high)	Stable	22 September 2023
France	AA	Stable	19 September 2025
Germany	AAA	Stable	1 December 2023
Greece	BBB	Stable	7 March 2025
India	BBB	Stable	10 May 2025
Ireland	AA	Stable	20 September 2024
Italy	A(low)	Stable	17 October 2025
Japan	A(high)	Stable	19 November 2023
Latvia	A	Stable	15 September 2023
Lithuania	A(high)	Stable	17 November 2023
Luxembourg	AAA	Stable	10 November 2023
Malta	A(high)	Stable	13 October 2023
Mexico	BBB	Stable	8 May 2023
Netherlands	AAA	Stable	15 September 2023
Norway	AAA	Stable	29 September 2023
Poland	A	Stable	10 November 2023
Portugal	A	Stable	21 July 2023
San Marino	BBB(low)	Stable	1 December 2023
Singapore	AAA	Stable	24 August 2023
Slovakia	A	Stable	25 August 2023
Slovenia	A(high)	Stable	8 December 2023
Spain	A	Stable	1 December 2023
Sweden	AAA	Stable	4 August 2023
Switzerland	AAA	Stable	21 July 2023
Turkey	BB(high)	Negative ▼	17 February 2017
United Kingdom	AA	Stable	17 November 2023
United States	AAA	Stable	10 October 2023
Uruguay	BBB	Stable	20 November 2023

=== Scope Ratings ===
For Scope – the European rating agency – a bond is considered investment grade if its credit rating is BBB− or higher. Bonds rated BB+ and below are considered to be speculative grade, sometimes also referred to as "junk" bonds.

Country/Territory	Rating	Outlook	Date
Austria	AA+	Negative ▼	12 September 2025
Belgium	A+	Stable	14 November 2025
Bulgaria	A−	Stable	11 July 2025
China	A	Stable	26 July 2024
Croatia	A−	Positive ▲	26 September 2025
Cyprus	A−	Positive ▲	10 October 2025
Czech Republic	AA−	Stable	19 September 2025
Denmark	AAA	Stable	1 August 2025
Estonia	A+	Stable	5 September 2025
Finland	AA+	Negative ▼	1 August 2025
France	AA−	Negative ▼	26 September 2025
Georgia	BB	Negative ▼	10 January 2025
Germany	AAA	Stable	12 September 2025
Greece	BBB+	Stable	18 September 2026
Hungary	BBB	Stable	10 October 2025
Ireland	AA	Stable	25 July 2025
Italy	BBB+	Positive ▲	31 October 2025
Japan	A	Stable	28 February 2025
Latvia	A−	Stable	5 September 2025
Lithuania	A+	Stable	5 September 2025
Luxembourg	AAA	Stable	25 April 2025
Malta	A+	Stable	4 July 2025
Netherlands	AAA	Stable	12 September 2025
Norway	AAA	Stable	1 August 2025
Poland	A	Stable	13 June 2025
Portugal	A	Positive ▲	31 October 2025
Romania	BBB−	Stable	21 November 2025
Serbia	BB+	Stable	27 June 2025
Slovakia	A	Negative ▼	27 June 2025
Slovenia	A+	Stable	16 May 2025
South Africa	BB	Stable	1 August 2025
Spain	A	Positive ▲	21 November 2025
Sweden	AAA	Stable	25 July 2025
Switzerland	AAA	Stable	4 October 2024
Turkey	BB−	Stable	24 October 2025
Ukraine	SD		30 August 2024
United Kingdom	AA	Stable	28 March 2025
United States	AA−	Stable	10 October 2025

=== JCR ===
Japan Credit Rating Agency (JCR) is a credit rating agency based in Japan. JCR is a Nationally Recognized Statistical Rating Organization by the U.S. Securities and Exchange Commission.

Country/Territory	Rating	Outlook	Date
Australia	AAA	Stable	26 April 2023
Belgium	AAA	Stable	2 June 2023
Brazil	BBB−	Stable	20 December 2023
Canada	AAA	Stable	20 December 2023
Chile	AA−	Stable	4 April 2023
China	AA−	Stable	2 November 2023
Czech Republic	AA−	Stable	30 June 2023
Denmark	AAA	Stable	15 December 2023
Egypt	AA	Stable	8 July 2024
Finland	AAA	Stable	22 February 2023
France	AAA	Stable	6 October 2022
Germany	AAA	Stable	3 August 2023
Hong Kong	AA+	Stable	27 April 2023
Hungary	A−	Stable	18 February 2022
India	A−	Stable	02 September 2026
Indonesia	BBB+	Stable	27 July 2022
Italy	A	Stable	16 December 2022
Japan	AAA	Stable	27 December 2023
Malaysia	A+	Stable	12 September 2022
Mexico	A−	Stable	18 August 2023
Netherlands	AAA	Stable	9 June 2023
Norway	AAA	Stable	7 September 2023
Peru	A−	Stable	27 April 2023
Philippines	A−	Stable	10 March 2023
Poland	A	Stable	16 November 2023
Portugal	A	Stable	13 January 2023
Romania	BBB	Stable	27 November 2023
Singapore	AAA	Stable	22 December 2023
Slovakia	A+	Negative ▼	6 October 2022
Slovenia	AA−	Stable	21 September 2022
South Korea	AA	Stable	30 September 2022
Spain	AA	Stable	24 April 2023
Thailand	A	Stable	11 November 2022
Turkey	BB	Stable	10 May 2024
United Kingdom	AAA	Stable	25 January 2023
United States	AAA	Stable	26 June 2023
Uruguay	A−	Stable	22 November 2023

=== China Chengxin ===
China Chengxin Credit Rating Group is a credit rating agency based in China.

Country/Territory	Rating	Outlook	Date
Austria	AAg	Stable	29 December 2023
Bangladesh	BB−g	Stable	29 December 2023
Belgium	A+g	Stable	29 December 2023
Bulgaria	BBB+g	Stable	29 December 2023
Cambodia	Bg	Stable	29 December 2023
Canada	AA+g	Stable	13 September 2023
China	AA+g	Stable	29 December 2023
Egypt	BB−g	Stable	15 November 2023
Estonia	A+g	Stable	29 December 2023
France	AAg	Stable	16 November 2023
Greece	BB+g	Stable	26 October 2023
Ireland	A+g	Stable	29 December 2023
Israel	A+g	Stable	26 October 2023
Italy	BBBg	Stable	29 December 2023
Korea	AA+g	Stable	13 September 2023
Mexico	BBBg	Stable	29 December 2023
Mongolia	B+g	Stable	29 December 2023
Netherlands	AA+g	Stable	29 December 2023
Pakistan	CCCg	Stable	13 September 2023
Romania	BBBg	Stable	29 December 2023
Saudi Arabia	AAg	Stable	13 September 2023
Singapore	AAAg	Stable	6 November 2023
Slovenia	Ag	Stable	29 December 2023
South Africa	BBg	Stable	29 December 2023
Spain	BBBg	Stable	13 September 2023
Switzerland	AAAg	Stable	29 December 2023
Thailand	A−g	Stable	29 December 2023
United Arab Emirates	Ag	Stable	29 December 2023
USA	AA+g	Stable	25 May 2023
Vietnam	BBg	Stable	13 September 2023

=== CareEdge Global Ratings ===
CareEdge Group is an Indian credit rating agency. For CareEdge, a bond is considered investment grade if its credit rating is BBB− or higher. Bonds rated BB+ and below are considered to be speculative grade. A bond is considered in default if its credit rating is D.

Country/Territory	Rating	Outlook	Date
Argentina	CCC	Stable	3 October 2024
Australia	AA+	Stable	3 October 2024
Bangladesh	CCC+	Stable	3 October 2024
Botswana	BBB+	Stable	3 October 2024
Brazil	BB+	Stable	3 October 2024
Canada	AA+	Stable	3 October 2024
Chile	A−	Stable	3 October 2024
China	A	Stable	3 October 2024
Colombia	BB+	Stable	3 October 2024
Ecuador	B−	Stable	3 October 2024
Egypt	B−	Stable	3 October 2024
Ethiopia	D	Stable	3 October 2024
France	AA−	Negative ▼	5 December 2024
Germany	AAA	Stable	30 December 2024
Greece	BB+	Stable	3 February 2025
India	BBB+	Stable	7 February 2025
Indonesia	BBB	Stable	3 October 2024
Italy	BBB	Stable	3 October 2024
Japan	AA−	Stable	5 February 2025
Korea	AA−	Stable	12 December 2024
Malaysia	A−	Stable	29 November 2024
Mauritius	BBB	Stable	31 January 2025
Mexico	BBB−	Stable	3 October 2024
Morocco	BBB−	Stable	3 October 2024
Netherlands	AAA	Stable	3 October 2024
Nigeria	B	Stable	3 October 2024
Peru	BBB−	Stable	3 October 2024
Philippines	BBB+	Stable	3 October 2024
Portugal	A+	Stable	3 February 2025
Singapore	AAA	Stable	29 November 2024
South Africa	BB	Stable	3 October 2024
Spain	A	Stable	3 October 2024
Sweden	AAA	Stable	30 December 2024
Thailand	A−	Stable	3 February 2025
Turkiye	B+	Stable	3 October 2024
UAE	AA−	Stable	3 October 2024
United Kingdom	AA−	Stable	3 October 2024
United States	AA+	Stable	3 October 2024
Vietnam	BB+	Stable	3 October 2024

== Unrated ==
UN member states that have not been assigned a credit rating by any of the eight rating agencies
Country	Details
Afghanistan	
Algeria	
Antigua and Barbuda	
Bhutan	
Brunei Darussalam	
Burundi	
Central African Republic	
Chad	
Comoros	
Djibouti	
Dominica	
Equatorial Guinea	
Eritrea	
Gambia	Fitch suspended Gambia's credit rating after its only traded international bond expired
Guinea	
Guinea-Bissau	
Guyana	
Haiti	
Iran	Fitch has withdrawn all ratings for Iran following the maturity and full repayment of the last outstanding sovereign eurobond on 21 April 2008.
Kiribati	
Liberia	
Libya	Fitch has withdrawn all ratings for Libya because it does not have enough information to maintain coverage of the issuer.
Malawi	
Mali	Mali was given a credit rating in 2004 as part of a UN development initiative, but the rating was later withdrawn.
Marshall Islands	
Mauritania	
Monaco	
Myanmar	
Nauru	
Niger	
North Korea	
Palau	
Saint Kitts and Nevis	
Saint Lucia	
Samoa	
Sao Tome and Principe	
Sierra Leone	
Solomon Islands	
Somalia	
Syria	
Timor Leste	
Tonga	
Tuvalu	
Vanuatu	
Yemen	
Zimbabwe	

== See also ==
- Bond credit rating
- List of U.S. states by credit rating
- United States federal government credit-rating downgrades
- Global debt
