= Labour Market Regulatory Authority (Bahrain) =

Government body of Bahrain

Authority overview
- Formed: 31 May 2006 (20 years ago)
- Type: Governmental Authority
- Headquarters: Sanabis, Manama; 26.230768°N 50.546465°E
- Authority executive: Nibras Mohamed Talib, CEO
- Parent Authority: Ministry of Labour
- Website: lmra.bh

The Labour Market Regulatory Authority (LMRA) is a government body of Bahrain with a corporate identity endowed with full financial and administrative independence under the authority of a board of directors chaired by the Minister of Labour. The Authority was established on 31 May 2006 to regulate and control work permits for foreign workers in Bahrain and the self-employed, in addition to issuing licenses for manpower and recruitment agencies.

Fees are imposed on companies for foreign work permits, as well as a monthly tax for each foreign worker they employ. At 2012, the foreign work permit fee was BD200, and the monthly tax for each foreign worker employed was BD10. There were 600,857 foreign workers in Bahrain at the end of the second quarter of 2018, compared to 158,814 Bahrainis employed.

== See also ==
- Tamkeen (Bahrain)
