= Qatarization =

Qatarization (or Qatarisation) is a governmental initiative devised to increase the number of Qatari citizens employed in public and private sectors. The target is 50% of the workforce in the Industry and Energy sector. Qatarization is one of the focuses of the Qatar National Vision 2030.

While the expatriate population has rapidly grown since the late 20th century, the Qatari population has increased only at a marginal rate. Therefore, as a means to decrease dependence on foreign labor, the Qatari government has heavily prioritized Qatarization in recent years.

== History ==
The first Qatarization scheme was formulated in 1962, with Qatari Labor Law No. 3, which stipulated that Qatari nationals are to be given first priority for filling vacant positions in the workforce. A government census conducted in 1970 revealed that only 16% of the economically active population were Qatari nationals. The only industry with a higher proportion of Qatari citizens to foreigners was the oil industry, which was a result of Qatarization policies.

In the early 1970s, after Qatar gained independence, administrative posts in the public sector were Qatarized. This resulted in 97% of the top administrative positions in the school system being occupied by Qataris by the 1990s. In May 1997, an emiri decree stipulated that at least 20% of the employees of private sector businesses must be Qatari citizens. On 1 June 2000, the most comprehensive Qatarization program went into effect with the aim of reaching a 50% national workforce in the energy sector by 2005. The program fell short of its target, with Qataris comprising only 28% of the labor force in the energy sector by the deadline.

== Challenges ==
A study by the RAND Corporation found that Qatari women are twice as likely to be university-educated as males. However, as a result of gender-exclusionary degrees in public universities, certain sectors are unable to benefit from the more proportionately educated female population.

== See also ==
- Economic nationalism
- Nativism
- Emiratisation
- Omanisation
- Saudization
