= Emiratisation =

United Arab Emirates government initiative

Emiratisation (or Emiratization) is an strategic workforce policy implemented by the government of the United Arab Emirates to employ its citizens in a meaningful and efficient manner in the public and private sectors.

In 2024, the United Arab Emirates had a population of approximately 10 million, with Emirati nationals comprising only about 11% and expatriates accounting for around 88%. The Emiratisation workforce policy is a strategic initiative designed to increase the participation of Emiratis in the private sector, address the demographic imbalance, and reduce dependence on foreign labor.

== Progress ==
While the program has been in place for more than a decade and results can be seen in the public sector, the private sector is still lagging behind with citizens only representing 0.34% of the private sector workforce as of 2009. In the UAE workplace, much better treatment is afforded to Emiratis than immigrants. And due to government social security payments, many locals would rather not go to work in menial jobs. However, unemployment is rising and in Abu Dhabi as many as 11.6 percent of Emiratis are unemployed.

While there is general agreement over the importance of Emiratisation for social, economic and political reasons, there is also some contention as to the impact of localization on organizational efficiency. It is yet unknown whether, and the extent to which, employment of nationals generates returns for MNEs operating in the Middle East. Recent research cautions that localization is not always advantageous for firms operating in the region, and its effectiveness depends on a number of contingent factors.

In December 2009 however, a positive impact of UAE citizens in the workplace was identified in a newspaper article citing a yet unpublished study, this advantage being the use of networks within the evolving power structures.

Overall, uptake in the private sector remains low regardless of significant investments in education, which have reached record levels with education now accounting for 22.5% – or $2.6 billion – of the overall budget planned for 2010. Multiple governmental initiatives are actively promoting Emiratisation by training anyone from high school dropouts to graduates in skills needed for the - essentially Western - work environment of the UAE, these initiatives include Tawteen UAE, ENDP or the Abu Dhabi Tawteen Council.

Beyond directly sponsoring educational initiatives, the Emirates Foundation for Philanthropy is funding major research initiatives into Emiratisation through competitive research grants, allowing universities such as United Arab Emirates University or Dubai School of Government to build and disseminate expertise on the topic.

Academics working on aspects of Emiratisation include, among many others, Ingo Forstenlechner from United Arab Emirates University, Kasim Randeree from the British University of Dubai, Paul Knoglinger from the FHWien, Marie-France Waxin from the American University of Sharjah. More broadly, Sidani and Al Ariss have recently published one of the first studies on Talent Management in the Persian Gulf region, including issues of localization published in Journal of World Business.

In a recent development, the monthly pension contribution structure for Emirati employees in the private sector underwent significant changes, marked by an increase of six percent. The adjustments, outlined in Law No. 57 of 2023, came into effect for Emiratis who entered the workforce after October 31, 2023. This update brings the total contribution salary to 26 percent.

== See also ==
- Economic nationalism
- Nativism (politics)
- Omanization
- Qatarization
- Saudization
