= Tamkeen (Bahrain) =

Bahraini government agency

Tamkeen (Arabic: تمكين, "enablement") is an semi-autonomous government agency in Bahrain. It was founded in 2006 by National Communication Centre to provide assistance and training to private-sector businesses and individuals, and to promote development of that sector. The chairman is Mohammed bin Essa Al Khalifa.

Tamkeen is funded by fees collected from the private sector by the Labour Market Regulatory Authority. At 2012, these fees include a BD200 charge imposed on companies for foreign work permits, as well as a BD10 monthly tax for each foreign worker they employ. However, MP Isa Al Kooheji said it was still unclear exactly where Tamkeen's money was being spent, because a detailed statement had never been presented to the National Assembly. There were 600,857 foreign workers in Bahrain at the end of the second quarter of 2018, compared to 158,814 Bahrainis employed.

The agency has taken steps to improve the employability of, and employment rate for, women in Bahrain, where in 2009–2010 approximately 80% of unemployed people were female. It provided training courses and grants, and organised a training and employment exhibition for women only. By 2011 almost, 12,000 women had been helped by the agency.
