= Saudization =

National policy of Saudi Arabia

Saudization (Arabic: السعودة), officially the Saudi nationalization scheme and also known as Nitaqat (Arabic: النطاقات), is a policy that is implemented in the Kingdom of Saudi Arabia by the Ministry of Labor and Social Development, which requires companies and enterprises to fill their workforce with Saudi nationals up to certain levels.

Prior to its implementation, the private sector was largely dominated by expatriate workers from India, Pakistan, the Philippines, and Arab countries such as Lebanon and Egypt.

The Saudi Government created the policy to reduce unemployment among native Saudis, under the slogan 'Let's Put the Saudi in Saudization'. Under the policy, companies that failed to comply with Saudization regulations will not be awarded government contracts. While the "Saudi political elite" agrees on the importance of Saudization, Saudi businesses have complained about its implementation and found loopholes to dodge Saudization demands.

In 2017, updates to the Saudization policy changed the percentage of Saudi nationals required in each company, depending on industry and company size.

== History ==
While many Saudi native men found employment with the government, there were not enough government jobs as over 65% of the population is of working age. 'Saudization' of the workforce has been a goal of the kingdom since at least the Fourth Development Plan (1985–1989) which called for replacing foreign workers with Saudi natives as one of its objectives. Immigration was tightened and many undocumented foreign workers were deported, but the program was only a marginal success.

A Saudization goal for 2003 mandated Saudis make up at least 30% of the employees in companies with 20 or more workers, and that the employee percentage of Saudis must be increased by 5% annually. However, fewer than 300,000 Saudis were employed in the approximately 10,000 companies of this size.

In June 2006, negotiations between business executives and senior government leaders, including King Abdullah, led to reductions of Saudization targets in some work sectors from 30 percent to 10 percent. In the case of two Chinese companies, they received full waivers from Saudization, according to discussions between US ambassador James C. Oberwetter and Saudi executives.

In 2014 the Saudi Gazette reported that one of the targets of the kingdom's Ninth Development Plan (2010–2015) — to "bring down the unemployment rate to 5.5 percent and revive the Saudization strategy"—had not been realized.

Currently, the plan targets women and Saudi youths to grow the kingdom's economy. The Shura council dictated in 2007 that 70 percent of the workforce must be Saudi. Between 2011 and 2013, the transportation and communication sectors recorded the highest improvement in Saudization rates from 9 percent to 20 percent. Manufacturing also had a notable improvement in Saudization rates from 13 percent to 19.3 percent.

Saudization rates in the retail and construction sectors also improved from 12.9 percent and 7.2 percent to 18.4 percent and 10.3 percent respectively, said the report. Taking average growth for the period between 2011 and 2013, improved Saudization rates in the transportation sector came mainly as a result of a significant 59 percent growth in the employment of Saudis. Average Saudi employment growth in the manufacturing and wholesale and retail sectors was also high, at 25 percent each. Meanwhile, employment growth for non-Saudis averaged just 4 percent and 7 percent respectively.

The construction sector — the most labor-intensive part of the private sector — recorded an impressive 34 percent average growth in employment of Saudis, while employment of non-Saudis in the sector grew by 14 percent. The higher growth in Saudi employment in the construction sector is impressive given the particularly high wage differential from non-Saudis. Saudis in the construction sector earned a monthly average of SR3,330 in 2013, while non-Saudis earned only SR1,029.

== Challenges ==
The main challenge that Saudization faces is that Saudi employees demand better working conditions than expats, as it is expected for expats to work with no weekends and with 10–12 hour shifts. In terms of salary, expats accept a lower salary than their Saudi counterparts, as they send most of their wages to their home country, where the cost of living is lower than in Saudi Arabia. As Saudi businesses became addicted to low cost labor that could live with low working conditions, there was no incentive to automate and improve working conditions. For example, most gas stations do not have self-service fueling stations, and there is also no self-service in shops and supermarkets. Another example is garbage collection and street cleaning, which is done in a primitive way requiring manual labor in low working conditions.

Some observers have called the Saudization efforts "desultory", stating that Saudi businesses find native Saudis unwilling to take service and manual labor jobs. One Saudi employer complained to a Western journalist, Max Rodenbeck: "I want to hire Saudis, but why would I hire someone who I know won't show up, won't care, and can't be fired?" When legislation reserved employment for Saudis in certain designated industries such as taxi driving and selling gold, the laws were quickly rescinded when the targeted industries "degenerated, almost immediately, into chaos" after non-native workers were replaced by Saudis with "no job knowledge and little inclination to work." One effect of the program has been to create a black market for visas for foreign workers estimated at $1500 or more (as of 2008), as Saudization enforcers attempt to limit the issue of work visas and private businesses seek to circumvent that limit. In 2014, Arab News reported that the failure to meet the Saudization target had led to thousands of businesses being shut down, and to others meeting the goals by "cooking the books" by hiring Saudis who do no actual work.

The first phase of Saudization went into effect in September 2018, wherein car dealerships and sellers of clothing, furniture, and household utensils would employ locals in approximately 70% of sales jobs. The reform is expected to create 60,000 jobs for Saudis. However, the demand is for 700,000 positions by 2020. The Saudi private sector is still in a very difficult phase, being dominated mostly by foreigners.

== Nitaqat ==
=== Description ===
Nitaqat system is a Saudization program aiming to increase the employment of Saudi nationals in the private sector. The program classifies the country's private firms into six categories: Platinum, High Green, Mid Green, Low Green, Yellow, and Red. Platinum is the highest percentage category, followed by High Green and so on; with the Yellow and Red categories being the lowest. The classification of other companies is based on the Saudization percentage (% of Saudi employees) and the total number of employees.

Nitaqat requires employers in the private sector with over 9 employees to hire a certain percentage of Saudi nationals, depending on the company's industry and the number of employees in the company. Companies with less than 10 employees are exempt from the program, but still need to employ at least one Saudi citizen. Rapid visa services are available only to businesses that are in the platinum category of the Nitaqat system to improve employment for Saudis.

The initiative was announced in June 2011, when the Ministry of Labor passed Ministerial Resolution no. (4040). The implementation deadline for the program was in 2013. Nearly 90,000 Indians left Saudi by the end of October 2013. About 466,689 Indian workers have renewed their iqamas (resident permit) over the last five months of the grace period, 359,997 workers have transferred their sponsorship and 355,035 workers changed their job titles to legalize their status (e.g.: profession change, sponsorship change, etc.) reports the Financial Express. More than 200,000 private firms were closed down in 2014 for failing to meet the conditions set within the Nitaqat nationalization program aimed at reducing unemployment among Saudis.

The companies receive incentives or penalties depending on the category they belong to: and a full list of percentage breakdown by industry and company size is available.

Saudi Arabia completed the regularization of nearly four million foreign workers in the second quarter of 2013 as part of its Nitaqat program, with 1.18 million ex-pats choosing to change their profession.

On 25 October 2026, King Salman, following a proposal by Crown Prince Mohammed bin Salman, directed that the minimum monthly wage required for a Saudi employee to be counted fully under the Nitaqat program be raised to SAR 5,000 six months after the measures take effect, and to SAR 6,000 twelve months after the first increase.

=== Misuse of Nitaqat ===
Some reports revealed that companies had been hiring Saudis with disabilities in order to boost Saudization rates as disabled employees count as 4 employees, thus saving the company from hiring able-bodied Saudi employees at higher salaries. The number of people with disabilities employed at a facility cannot exceed 10 percent. If employees with disabilities in a firm exceed more than 10 percent of the total number of Saudi employees, then each disabled worker is calculated like any other Saudi.

== See also ==
- Foreign workers in Saudi Arabia
- Emiratisation
- Omanisation
- Qatarization
- Economic nationalism
- Nativism (politics)
