= December 1957 =

Month of 1957

| << | December 1957 | | | | | >> |
| Su | Mo | Tu | We | Th | Fr | Sa |
| 1 | 2 | 3 | 4 | 5 | 6 | 7 |
| 8 | 9 | 10 | 11 | 12 | 13 | 14 |
| 15 | 16 | 17 | 18 | 19 | 20 | 21 |
| 22 | 23 | 24 | 25 | 26 | 27 | 28 |
| 29 | 30 | 31 |

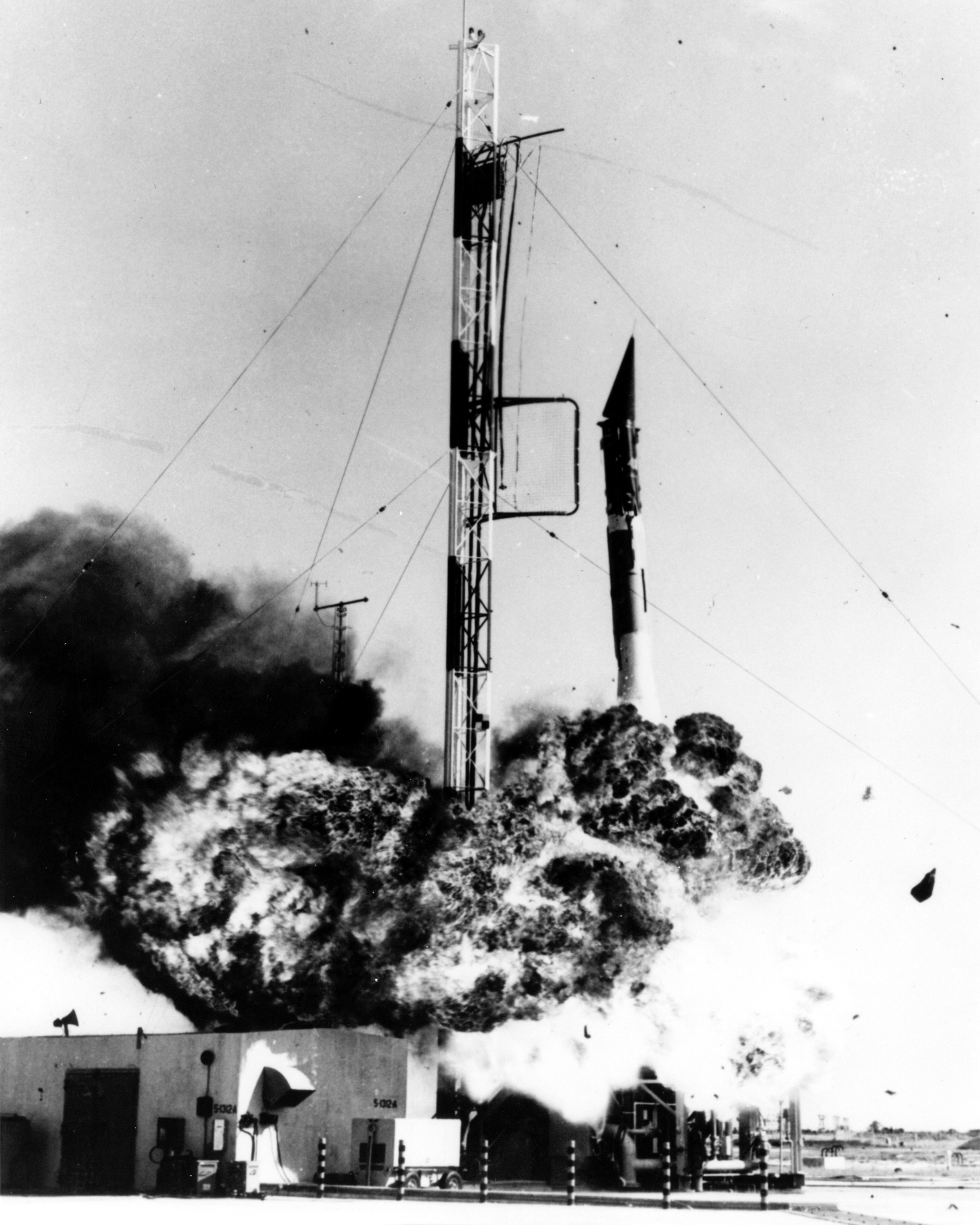
December 6, 1957: Vanguard rocket explodes on launch pad

The following events occurred in December 1957:

== December 1, 1957 (Sunday) ==
- In Indonesia, Sukarno announced the nationalization of 246 Dutch businesses.
- Colombia held a referendum on the constitutional reform program of its military junta. This was the first time women in Colombia were allowed to vote, and the reforms included equal rights for men and women. 95.27% of voters approved of the program.
- Born:
  - Tjahjo Kumolo, Indonesian politician; in Surakarta, Indonesia (d. 2022, multiple organ failure)
  - Deep Roy (born Mohinder Purba), Anglo-Indian actor, stuntman, puppeteer, and comedian; in Nairobi, Kenya Colony
  - Vesta Williams (born Mary Vesta Williams), American singer-songwriter; in Coshocton, Ohio (d. 2011, hypertensive heart disease)

== December 2, 1957 (Monday) ==
- At 4:30 a.m., the reactor at the Shippingport Atomic Power Station in Shippingport, Pennsylvania, reached criticality for the first time. The plant would become fully operational on December 23.
- The United Nations Security Council adopted Resolution 126, concerning the dispute between India and Pakistan over Jammu and Kashmir.
- The first four rounds of the 1958 NFL draft were held in Philadelphia. The Chicago Cardinals selected quarterback King Hill of Rice University with the first overall draft pick.
- Died:
  - Harrison Ford, 73, American silent film actor, died of injuries from a 1951 pedestrian accident.
  - Leslie Henson, 66, English comedian, producer and director
  - Manfred Sakel, 57, Austrian-American psychiatrist, developer of insulin shock therapy, died of a heart attack.

== December 3, 1957 (Tuesday) ==
- Seven-year-old Maria Ridulph disappeared from Sycamore, Illinois. Her body would be found near Woodbine, Illinois, on April 26, 1958. Jack McCullough (formerly known as John Tessier) would be convicted of the murder in 2012, but released from prison in 2016 and declared innocent in 2017 after a post-conviction review of evidence. The case remains unsolved.
- Died:
  - Frank Gannett, 81, American publisher, founder of Gannett, died of complications from a fall.
  - Herbert F. Leary, 72, United States Navy vice admiral

== December 4, 1957 (Wednesday) ==
- A magnitude 8.1 earthquake in southern Mongolia killed 30 people and destroyed the towns of Dzun Bogd, Bayan-leg and Barum Bogd.
- The Lewisham rail crash in London, UK, killed 90 people.
- Speaking before the House of Lords during a debate on the Wolfenden report, Geoffrey Fisher, the Archbishop of Canterbury, expressed support for legislation to decriminalize homosexual relations between consenting adults in the United Kingdom, while also advocating tougher legal measures against the "prostitute's customer".
- The American Rocket Society's proposal for an Astronautical Research and Development Agency, formally presented to U.S. President Dwight D. Eisenhower on October 14, 1957, was publicly announced.

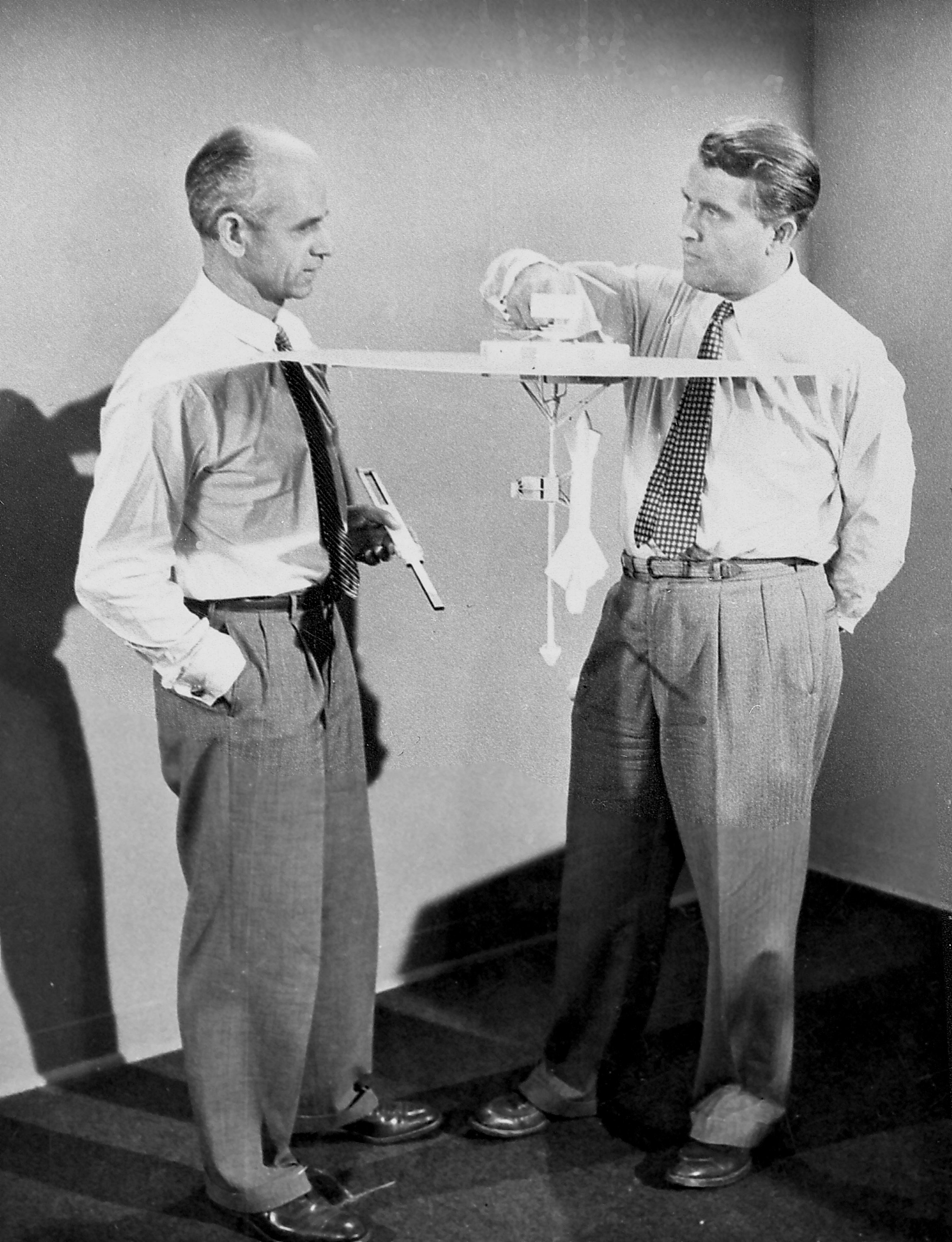
Scientists Ernst Stuhlinger (left) and Wernher von Braun at the Walt Disney Studios

- The American Broadcasting Company (ABC) aired Mars and Beyond, an episode of the Disneyland anthology television series, discussing Wernher von Braun's ideas for a human mission to Mars.
- Born:
  - Dave Brown, British political cartoonist; in Barnehurst, Kent
  - Eric S. Raymond, American open-source software advocate; in Boston, Massachusetts
  - Lee Smith, American baseball player; in Jamestown, Louisiana
- Died:
  - Barclay Acheson, 70, chairman of Reader's Digest International Editions, brother of Lila Acheson Wallace, cerebral hemorrhage
  - Huisheng, 19, Chinese princess and Japanese noblewoman, committed joint suicide by firearm with her lover Takemichi Ōkubo. The event became known as the Amagisan shinjū (天城山心中, Love Suicide at Mount Amagi).
  - Sir John Lavarack, 71, Australian World War II general, Governor of Queensland
  - José Alves Correia da Silva, 85, Portuguese Roman Catholic priest, Bishop of Leiria

== December 5, 1957 (Thursday) ==
- Sally (Thyra) Bowman (43), her daughter Wendy (14), and family friend Thomas Whelan (22) were beaten and shot to death at Sundown Station in South Australia while traveling by car from Alice Springs to Adelaide. 25-year-old Raymond John Bailey would be arrested for the murders in January 1958, convicted, and hanged on 24 June 1958. Investigative journalist Stephen Bishop asked for a posthumous pardon for Bailey in February 2013, but the request was denied.
- All 326,000 Dutch nationals were expelled from Indonesia.
- In Bochum, West Germany, a gas explosion in an apartment house killed at least nine people and injured 15.
- An explosion and fire in Villa Rica, Georgia, killed 12 people and injured 30.
- An announcement was made that an Advanced Research Projects Agency would be created in the United States Department of Defense to direct its space projects.

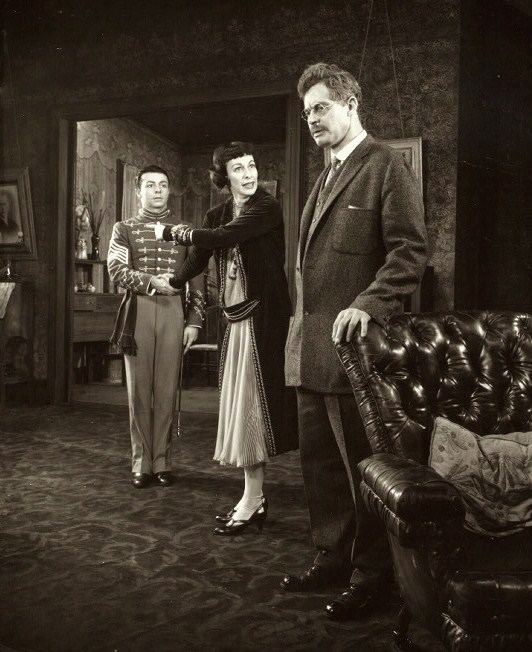
Timmy Everett, Eileen Heckart and Frank Overton in The Dark at the Top of the Stairs

- William Inge's autobiographical play The Dark at the Top of the Stairs, directed by Elia Kazan, opened at the Music Box Theatre in New York City.
- Born: Dave Brown, Australian rugby league prop; in Brisbane, Queensland, Australia
- Died:
  - Guido Schmidt, 56, Austrian diplomat and politician, died of grippe.
  - Thomas J. Spellacy, 77, American politician and lawyer, 47th Mayor of Hartford, Connecticut, died of a heart attack.

== December 6, 1957 (Friday) ==
- The first U.S. attempt to launch a satellite failed, when the IGY Vanguard TV-3 rocket, the first with three live stages, exploded on the launch pad. The Soviet TASS news agency promptly reported the explosion. President Eisenhower requested a full report on the launch failure from the United States Department of Defense. Physicist Joseph Kaplan, chairman of the U.S. National Committee for the International Geophysical Year, cautioned the American public against hysteria over the failure, noting that initial experiments "seldom succeed".

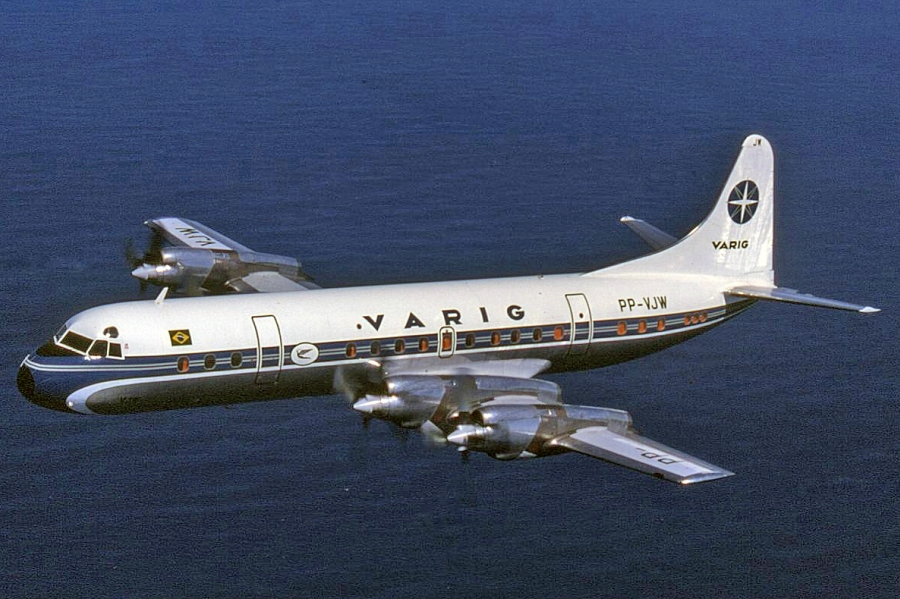
A Lockheed L-188 Electra in 1988

- Test pilots Herman Salmon and Roy Edwin Wimmer and flight engineers Louis Holland and William Spreuer made the first flight of the Lockheed L-188 Electra airliner from the Lockheed Air Terminal in Burbank, California.
- A survey showed that 14 boys had been fatally injured while playing high school football in the United States in 1957.
- Born:
  - Steve Bedrosian, American baseball player; in Methuen, Massachusetts
  - Tom Brinkman, American politician, member of the Ohio House of Representatives; in Cincinnati, Ohio
  - Andrew Cuomo, American politician, 56th Governor of New York; in New York City
- Died:
  - Claude Barnard, 67, Australian politician and government minister, died of cancer.
  - Robert Esnault-Pelterie, 76, French aircraft designer and pioneer rocket theorist
  - Hugh Mackay, 69, Canadian politician

== December 7, 1957 (Saturday) ==
- A collision between two cars 35 miles (56 km) south of Sebring, Florida, killed four adults and two children and injured three other children.
- Born:
  - John Lee Ka-chiu, Hong Kong police officer and politician; in British Hong Kong
  - Tijjani Muhammad-Bande, Nigerian career diplomat, President of the United Nations General Assembly (2019); in Zagga, Northern Region, British Nigeria
- Died:
  - Sir Edmund Wyly Grier RCA DCL, 95, Australian-born Canadian portrait painter
  - William J. P. MacMillan, 76, Canadian politician, 18th Premier of Prince Edward Island

== December 8, 1957 (Sunday) ==
- The crash of Aerolíneas Argentinas Flight 670 in a rainstorm, 180 miles (290 km) southwest of Buenos Aires, killed 61 people. At the time, this was the worst aviation accident in the history of Argentina.
- In Opp, Alabama, five people died in a high speed head-on collision, including four airmen from Eglin Air Force Base.
- Fire destroyed a cottage 3 miles (4.8 km) west of Park Falls, Wisconsin, killing eight children.
- Born:
  - Peter Brown, Australian rules footballer
  - Cai Guo-Qiang, Chinese artist; in Quanzhou, Fujian, China
  - Phil Collen, English rock guitarist (Def Leppard); in Hackney Central, London
  - Slick (ring name of Kenneth Wayne Johnson), American professional wrestling manager; in Fort Worth, Texas
- Died:
  - James A. Gallagher, 88, American banker and businessman, member of the United States House of Representatives from Pennsylvania
  - Reginald Sheffield, 56, English actor

== December 9, 1957 (Monday) ==
- A railway accident in Taiwan caused by children stacking ballast on the rails killed 19 people and injured 116.
- On the same day, the Codogno rail crash killed 15 people and seriously injured at least 30 in Codogno, Italy, when the Milan–Rome express crashed into a truck at a level crossing.
- Born:
  - José Luis Gil, Spanish actor and voice actor; in Zaragoza, Spain
  - Ernesto González, Nicaraguan Olympic lightweight boxer
  - Peter O'Mara, Australian jazz guitarist and composer
  - Donny Osmond, American singer and actor (The Osmonds); in Ogden, Utah
  - Ian Richards, English cricketer; in Stockton-on-Tees, County Durham, England
- Died: Charles Patteson, 66, English field hockey player, cricketer and clergyman

== December 10, 1957 (Tuesday) ==
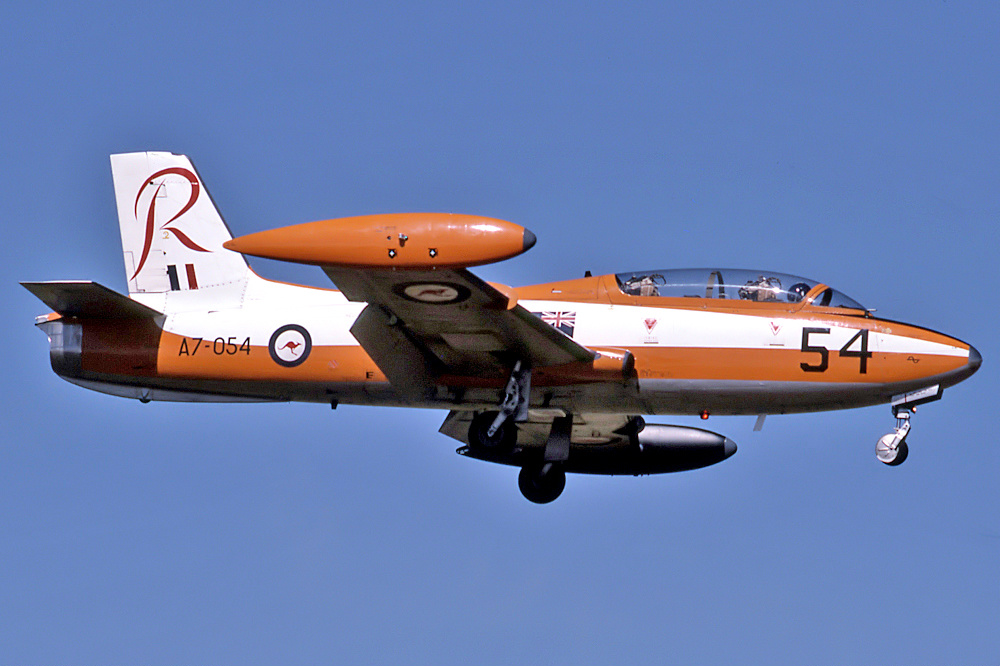
An Aermacchi MB-326H in 1986

- Test pilot Guido Carestiato made the first flight of the Aermacchi MB-326 military jet trainer.
- Canadian diplomat Lester B. Pearson received the Nobel Peace Prize for his peacekeeping efforts in the United Nations.
- The United States Air Force created a Directorate of Astronautics to manage and coordinate astronautical research programs, including work on satellites and antimissile-missile weapons. Brigadier General Homer A. Boushey was named to head the office. James H. Douglas Jr., U.S. Secretary of the Air Force, rescinded the order on December 13, considering the creation of such a group before the activation of the Advanced Research Projects Agency to be premature.
- Born:
  - Michael Clarke Duncan, American actor; in Chicago, Illinois (d. 2012, complications from heart attack)
  - Paul Hardcastle, English musician; in Kensington, London
  - Nancy Karetak-Lindell, Canadian politician; in Eskimo Point, Northwest Territories (now Arviat, Nunavut)
  - José Mário Vaz, 5th President of Guinea-Bissau; in Calequisse, Portuguese Guinea
- Died:
  - Dan Bryant (born Leslie Vickery Bryant), 52, New Zealand mountaineer, died in a traffic collision.
  - Gustav Waldemar Elmen, 80, Swedish-born American metallurgist
  - Maurice McLoughlin, 67, American tennis champion
  - Roland Fairbairn McWilliams KC, 83, Canadian politician, 13th Lieutenant Governor of Manitoba
  - James Stevenson-Hamilton, 90, first warden of South Africa's Kruger National Park
  - Napoleon Zervas, 66, Greek World War II Resistance leader, died of a heart ailment.

== December 11, 1957 (Wednesday) ==
- East Germany introduced a strict new passport law in an attempt to reduce the number of refugees fleeing to West Germany. The effect was that more East Germans would flee to the West from East Berlin. Although there were severe penalties for East Germans caught trying to escape to West Berlin, there were no physical barriers on the boundary between the two cities, and it was still possible to ride a subway train across the border. By 1961, when one-fifth of the East German population had emigrated to the West, the Communist government would erect the Berlin Wall and fortified boundaries along the rest of the nation's border to make escape almost impossible.
- I. I. Chundrigar resigned as Prime Minister of Pakistan after losing a vote of confidence. He was replaced on December 16 by Feroz Khan Noon.
- Ibrahim Ali Didi was forced to resign as Prime Minister of the Maldives by the Sultan Muhammad Fareed Didi. At the time, the Maldive Islands were a British protectorate. Ibrahim Nasir became the new Premier the next day.
- Died:
  - Blue Peter, 21, British Thoroughbred racehorse, was euthanized after a heart attack.
  - Frederick G. Creed, 86, Canadian inventor
  - Marie Suzette de Marigny Hall Dewey, 70, American Red Cross official, wife of Charles S. Dewey
  - John McDowell, 55, American politician, member of the United States House of Representatives from Pennsylvania, shot himself to death.
  - Musidora, 68, French actress

== December 12, 1957 (Thursday) ==
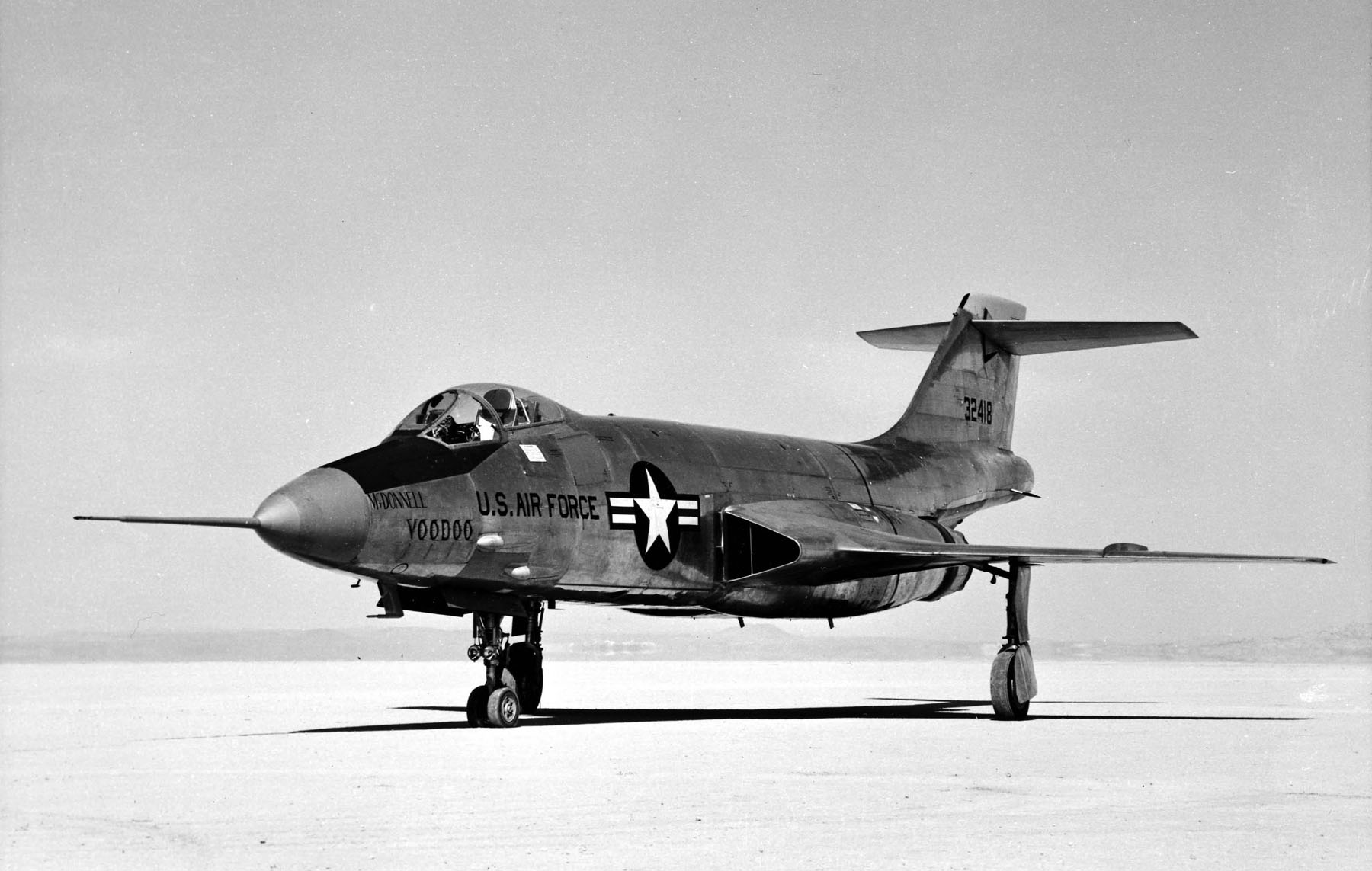
A McDonnell F-101A Voodoo at Edwards in 1954

- Pilot Adrian E. Drew set a new world flight airspeed record of 1,207.63 miles per hour (1,943.49 km/h), flying a United States Air Force McDonnell F-101A Voodoo at Edwards Air Force Base in California.
- A B-52 jet bomber crashed on takeoff from Fairchild Air Force Base in Washington state, killing eight of the plane's nine crew members. The tail gunner, T. Sgt. Gene I. Graye, was the sole survivor. The accident was caused by trim motors that had been connected backwards.
- Born:
  - Robert Lepage, Canadian playwright, actor and film and stage director; in Quebec
  - Sheila E. (born Sheila Cecilia Escovedo), American percussionist, singer, author, and actress; in Oakland, California
  - Aïssata Tall Sall, Senegalese lawyer and politician; in Podor, Senegal
- Died:
  - Pansy E. Black (pseudonym for Pansy Ellen Beach), 67, American stenographer and short story writer
  - W. Langdon Kihn, 59, American portrait painter and illustrator
  - Robert Kurka, 35, American composer, died of leukemia.
  - Emmett Jay Scott, 84, American journalist, government official and educator, advisor to Booker T. Washington
  - Louise Zabriskie, 70, American registered nurse and childcare expert

== December 13, 1957 (Friday) ==
- In Kermanshah Province, Iran, the magnitude 6.5 Farsinaj earthquake killed 1,119 people and injured 900.
- Born: Steve Buscemi, American actor; in Brooklyn, New York City
- Died:
  - Michael Sadleir, 68, English novelist and publisher
  - Harcourt Williams, 77, English actor and director

== December 14, 1957 (Saturday) ==
- During a Scottish Football League match between Clyde F.C. and Celtic F.C. at Shawfield Stadium in Rutherglen, South Lanarkshire, a section of boundary wall collapsed, injuring 50 people, mostly children, and killing a 9-year-old boy.
- The original production of the Broadway musical The Most Happy Fella by Frank Loesser closed after 676 performances.
- Born:
  - Mario Baccini, Italian politician; in Rome
  - Patrick Deville, French writer; in Saint-Brevin-les-Pins, Loire-Atlantique, France

== December 15, 1957 (Sunday) ==
- Abdul-Wahab Mirjan became the new Prime Minister of the Kingdom of Iraq
- The Customs Convention on the Temporary Importation of Private Road Vehicles, signed at the United Nations by members on June 4, 1954, entered into force, allowing foreign tourists and other visitors to bring their own road vehicle without having to pay a duty tax.
- Born:
  - Jan Bosschaert, Belgian comics artist, painter and illustrator; in Borgerhout, Flanders
  - Chō (born Shigeru Nagashima), Japanese actor and narrator; in Kōnosu, Saitama Prefecture, Japan
  - Mario Marois, Canadian professional ice hockey defenceman; in L'Ancienne-Lorette, Quebec
  - Mike McAlary, American Pulitzer Prize-winning journalist (d. 1998, colon cancer)
  - Laura Molina, American artist, musician and actress; in Los Angeles, California
- Died:
  - Alfonso Bedoya, 53, Mexican actor, died of a heart attack.
  - Leonidas C. Dyer, 86, American military officer, attorney and civil rights activist, member of the United States House of Representatives from Missouri, infirmities

== December 16, 1957 (Monday) ==
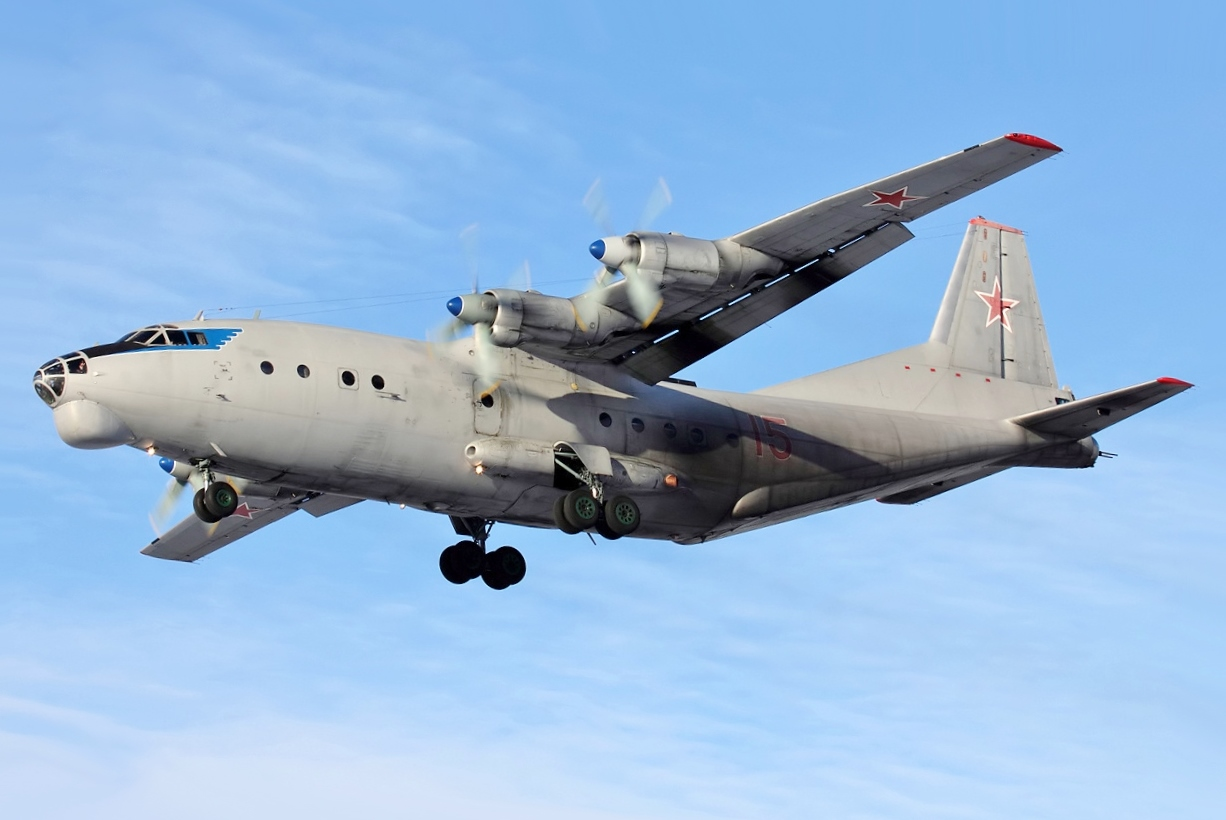
An Antonov An-12 in 2011

- The prototype of the Antonov An-12 transport aircraft made its first flight.
- A summit meeting of the NATO heads of government began in Paris, France, and would conclude on December 19.
- Born: Nikolai Kuimov, Russian test pilot, Hero of the Russian Federation; in Podolsk, Moscow Oblast, Russian Soviet Federative Socialist Republic, Soviet Union (d. 2021, plane crash)
- Died:
  - Heinrich Hoffmann, 72, official photographer of Adolf Hitler
  - Will Morrissey, 70, American actor and theatrical producer
  - Kirby Page, 67, American Disciples of Christ minister, author and peace activist, died of a heart attack.

== December 17, 1957 (Tuesday) ==
- The film Witness for the Prosecution, directed by Billy Wilder and based on the play of the same name by Agatha Christie, opened in Los Angeles. It would go into general release in February 1958.
- Born: Doug Parker, Canadian voice actor and voice director
- Died:
  - Fritz Ostermueller, 50, American Major League Baseball pitcher, died of colon cancer.
  - Dorothy L. Sayers, 64, British crime writer, poet, playwright and essayist, died of coronary thrombosis.

== December 18, 1957 (Wednesday) ==
- A tornado outbreak sequence began in Illinois, Missouri and Indiana. The sequence would continue until December 20, affecting the Midwestern and Southern United States, causing 19 deaths, 291 injuries and $15,855,000 in damage. This included a violent F5 tornado, which wiped out the entire community of Sunfield, Illinois.
- A B-47 Stratojet bomber crashed on the grounds of the Palomar Observatory in San Diego County, California, killing the plane's crew.
- Died:
  - Camillo Castiglioni, 78, Italian-Austrian financier and banker, died of bronchial pneumonia.
  - Jere Cooper, 64, member of the United States House of Representatives from Tennessee
  - John D. Price, 65, United States Navy admiral and aviator
  - James Marion West Jr., 54, Texas oil millionaire, died after a diabetic coma.

== December 19, 1957 (Thursday) ==
- The successful musical The Music Man, with words and music by Meredith Willson, premiered on Broadway at the Majestic Theatre for the first of 1,375 performances. The original cast included Robert Preston as Harold Hill and Barbara Cook as Marian Paroo.
- The first non-stop airline flight from London to Canada was made, as an 18 Bristol Britannia 312 arrived in Canada.
- In the U.S., the first successful test of the Phase II model of the PGM-17 Thor ballistic missile was made.
- Born:
  - Cyril Collard, French author, filmmaker, musician and actor; in Paris (d. 1993, AIDS-related illness)
  - Michael E. Fossum, American engineer and astronaut; in Sioux Falls, South Dakota
  - Kevin McHale, American basketball player; in Hibbing, Minnesota
  - Tracy Pew, Australian musician; in Melbourne, Victoria, Australia (d. 1986, brain haemorrhage)
- Died:
  - John F. Hunter, 61, American lawyer and soldier, member of the United States House of Representatives from Ohio
  - Frans August Larson, 87, Swedish missionary and explorer
  - John Van Druten, 56, English-American playwright and theatre director

== December 20, 1957 (Friday) ==
- American lyricist and librettist Alan Jay Lerner married Parisian lawyer Micheline Muselli Pozzo di Borgo in Manhattan. This was Lerner's fourth marriage and di Borgo's second. The couple would divorce in 1965.
- The Boeing 707 airliner flew for the first time.
- American singer Elvis Presley received his draft notice. He would be sworn in to the United States Army on March 24, 1958.
- Born:
  - Stephen Bicknell, British organ builder; in Chelsea, London (d. 2007)
  - Billy Bragg, British singer; in Barking, Essex, England
  - Pat Fish (born Patrick Huntrods), English musician; in London (d. 2021, heart attack)
  - Joyce Hyser, American actress; in New York City
  - Arturs Maskats, Latvian composer; in Valmiera, Latvia
  - Bruce Stanton, Canadian politician; in Orillia, Ontario
  - Anna Vissi, Greek singer; in Pyla, Larnaca District, Cyprus
  - Mike Watt, American bassist, vocalist and songwriter; in Portsmouth, Virginia
- Died: Walter Page, 57, American jazz instrumentalist and bandleader, died of a kidney ailment and pneumonia.

== December 21, 1957 (Saturday) ==
- In association football, Charlton Athletic F.C. and Huddersfield Town A.F.C. played a classic match at Charlton Athletic's home ground, The Valley, in Charlton, London. Charlton Athletic won, 7–6, in what The Observer would describe in 2001 as one of the 10 greatest comebacks in sports history.
- Born:
  - Tom Henke, American Major League Baseball pitcher; in Kansas City, Missouri
  - Ray Romano, American actor and comedian; in Queens, New York City
- Died:
  - Eric Coates, 71, English composer, died of a stroke.
  - Alfred Conkling Coxe Jr., 77, United States federal judge
  - Sir George Lynskey, 69, English judge, died of coronary thrombosis.

== December 22, 1957 (Sunday) ==
- The Scottish freighter SS Narva sank in the North Sea while going to the aid of a collier in distress. All 28 crewmen aboard the Narva were lost. The crew of the collier were rescued.
- Born: Carole James, Canadian politician; in Dukinfield, England
- Died:
  - Lucille May Grace, 57, American politician
  - Ray Sprigle (born Martin Raymond Sprigle), 71, American Pulitzer Prize-winning journalist, died of injuries from a traffic collision.
  - Tom Sullivan, 38, American professional light heavyweight boxer, was shot to death in Boston. His murder remains unsolved.
  - Robert Zuppke, 78, German-born American football coach, writer and painter

== December 23, 1957 (Monday) ==
- The crash of a U.S. Navy radar plane killed 19 of the 23 crew when it ditched off the coast of the Hawaiian island of Oahu. The Lockheed WV-2 Warning Star had been on a routine training patrol along the Pacific Ocean extension of the Distant Early Warning Line.
- Flames spread by winds in Rankin, Pennsylvania, destroyed or damaged 25 buildings in a three-block area.
- The United States Air Force ordered the North American B-70 Valkyrie to serve as the planned replacement for the Boeing B-52 Stratofortress. The B-70 would be rendered outmoded by the introduction of intercontinental ballistic missiles, and only two were ever built. As of 2023, the B-52 remains in service with the USAF.
- Born:
  - Alan Brown, English cricketer; in Darwen, Lancashire
  - Mike Brown, American professional ice hockey defenceman; in Detroit, Michigan
- Died:
  - Dod Orsborne, 55, British sailor, died of a heart attack.
  - Michael Schaap, 83, American businessman and politician, died in a fall from a 12th-floor suite at the Hotel Chatham in Manhattan.

== December 24, 1957 (Tuesday) ==
- The explosion and sinking of the Brazilian freighter Cisne Branco ("White Swan"), a yacht that had been converted to coastal service, killed all 30 people aboard. According to the Brazilian news agency Asapress, Cisne Branco had been transporting 10 students and their teacher, along with its crew of six and other passengers, when a spark set off a cargo of high powered aviation gasoline being transported from San Salvador to Itacare.
- Born: Hamid Karzai, 4th President of Afghanistan from 2002 to 2014; in Karz, Kandahar, Kingdom of Afghanistan
- Died:
  - Arturo Barea, 60, Spanish writer, died of a heart attack.
  - Stanley Link, 63, American comics artist (Tiny Tim)
  - Shūmei Ōkawa, 71, Japanese nationalist and Pan-Asianist writer, died of a heart ailment.
  - Norma Talmadge, 63, American actress, died of pneumonia.

== December 25, 1957 (Wednesday) ==
- Queen Elizabeth II's Royal Christmas Message was televised for the first time. The Queen broadcast her message from the Long Library at Sandringham House, Norfolk.
- 20th Century Fox released the American war film The Enemy Below, based on a British novel of the same name by Denys Rayner and starring Robert Mitchum and Curt Jurgens.
- Born:
  - Shane MacGowan, Irish singer and songwriter (The Pogues); in Pembury, Kent, England
  - Bill Perry (born William Sanford Perry), American blues musician; in Goshen, New York (d. 2007, heart attack)
- Died:
  - Robert H. Gittins, 88, American lawyer and newspaper publisher, member of the United States House of Representatives from New York
  - Alfred Walton Hinds, 83, 17th Naval Governor of Guam
  - William Murrill, 88, American mycologist
  - Frederick Law Olmsted Jr., 87, American landscape architect and city planner
  - Charles Pathé, 93, French film pioneer
  - Stanley Vestal (born Walter Stanley Vestal, a.k.a. Walter S. Campbell), 70, American author and historian, died of a heart attack.

== December 26, 1957 (Thursday) ==
- The 1957 Sydney to Hobart Yacht Race began in Sydney, New South Wales, Australia. It would conclude on January 3, 1958.
- Born: Mike South, American pornographic actor, director and gossip columnist; in Atlanta, Georgia
- Died: Angelo Motta, 67, Italian entrepreneur, died of a heart attack.

== December 27, 1957 (Friday) ==
- The eighth congress of the Black African Students Federation in France (FEANF) began; it would conclude on December 31. The congress called for Algerian independence, the establishment of a pan-African conference, the creation of an African youth festival, and political independence in Africa.
- Master Sergeant Albert Pensiero of the Connecticut National Guard became the first person to receive the Connecticut Medal of Valor, in recognition of his heroism during Connecticut's severe floods in August 1955. Pensiero had rescued over 24 people from the floods in Unionville and brought urgently needed medical supplies by duck boat to Winsted.
- Born:
  - José Cuevas, Mexican professional welterweight boxer; in Santo Tomás de los Plátanos, Mexico
  - Ali Irsan, Jordanian-American convicted murderer
- Died:
  - Alan Bridge, 66, American character actor
  - Mel Coogan, 61, American lightweight boxer
  - Louis Hasselmans, 79, French cellist and conductor
  - Eugene J. McGuinness, 68, American Roman Catholic bishop
  - Otto Nuschke, 74, German politician, Deputy Prime Minister of East Germany, died of a heart attack.
  - Egon Ranshofen-Wertheimer, 63, Austrian-American diplomat and journalist, died of a heart attack at New York International Airport.

== December 28, 1957 (Saturday) ==
- In the 1957 Gator Bowl, played at Gator Bowl Stadium in Jacksonville, Florida, the Tennessee Volunteers defeated the Texas A&M Aggies by a score of 3–0. Bobby Gordon was named the game's MVP for Tennessee.
- American actors Natalie Wood and Robert Wagner married each other for the first time. They would divorce in 1962 and marry again in 1972.
- Died: Hilda Vaughn, 59, American actress

== December 29, 1957 (Sunday) ==
- In the 1957 DFB-Pokal final, played at the Rosenaustadion in Augsburg, West Germany, FC Bayern Munich defeated Fortuna Düsseldorf by a score of 1–0 to claim the 1956–57 DFB-Pokal association football title.
- In the 1957 NFL Championship Game, played at Briggs Stadium in Detroit, Michigan, the Detroit Lions defeated the Cleveland Browns by a score of 59–14. Browns quarterback Tommy O'Connell disclosed after the game that he had fractured his left leg on December 1. As of 2023 this remains the Detroit Lions' most recent appearance in an NFL championship game.
- Fred Combs, a 36-year-old American racing driver, was killed in a race crash at the Manzanita Speedway in Phoenix, Arizona. He was ejected through the roof opening of his car when a pin in his seat belt buckle assembly failed.
- Born: Juan Perry, Peruvian politician
- Died:
  - Reginald Croom-Johnson, 78, British barrister, judge, and Member of Parliament
  - Ernie Henry, 31, American jazz saxophonist, died of a heroin overdose.
  - Arthur Johnson Mellott, 69, United States federal judge
  - Ezio Selva, 55, Italian Olympic diver, wire manufacturer and powerboat racer, was killed in a boat race crash in Miami Beach, Florida.
  - Sir Humphrey Walwyn, KCSI, KCMG, CB, DSO, 78, Royal Navy Vice-Admiral, Commission Governor of Newfoundland

== December 30, 1957 (Monday) ==
- The government of Ghana declared a state of emergency in the city of Kumasi.
- Anne Noblett disappeared at the age of 17 while returning to her home in Marshalls Heath, Hertfordshire, after attending a dance. Her body would be discovered in woodland near Whitwell, Hertfordshire, on 31 January 1958. Noblett's murder remains unsolved.
- Future Watergate scandal figures John N. Mitchell and Martha Beall Jennings were married.
- Jockey Raul Contreras died of injuries sustained in a two-horse pileup at the Agua Caliente Racetrack.
- Born:
  - Greg Hertz, American businessman and politician, member of the Montana House of Representatives; in Malta, Montana
  - Matt Lauer, American newscaster; in New York City
- Died: James Wentworth Parker, 71, American mechanical engineer, died of a heart attack.

== December 31, 1957 (Tuesday) ==
- Oil began flowing from the Sahara Desert of French Algeria (at the time, politically part of France) as the 150-mile (240 km) underground pipeline opened between the oil fields at Hassi Messaoud for pumping to the railway junction at Touggourt, to be transported by tanker cars to the port of Phillipeville (now Skikda). French officials forecast that, by 1960, the Saharan oil fields would supply 10 million tons of oil per year for half of France's oil needs. Following Algeria's independence in 1959, the North African republic would nationalize all French holdings on February 24, 1971.
- In Tokyo, Japan's Foreign Minister Aiichiro Fujiyama and South Korea's ambassador Kim Yu Taik signed three agreements in order to normalize relations between Japan and her former colony. The agreement cleared the way for the release of fishermen who had been imprisoned for violating claimed territorial waters, with 833 Japanese held in South Korea and 1,743 Koreans held in Japan.
- Died: Óscar Domínguez, 51, Spanish painter, committed suicide by sharp instrument.
