= November 1957 =

Month of 1957

<<	November 1957					>>
Su	Mo	Tu	We	Th	Fr	Sa
					1	2
3	4	5	6	7	8	9
10	11	12	13	14	15	16
17	18	19	20	21	22	23
24	25	26	27	28	29	30

The following events occurred in November 1957:

== November 1, 1957 (Friday) ==
- The Public Health Service in Washington, D.C., announced that manufacturers would soon be producing a more powerful vaccine for the so-called "Asian influenza" and said that many people who had already been vaccinated should receive a second shot.

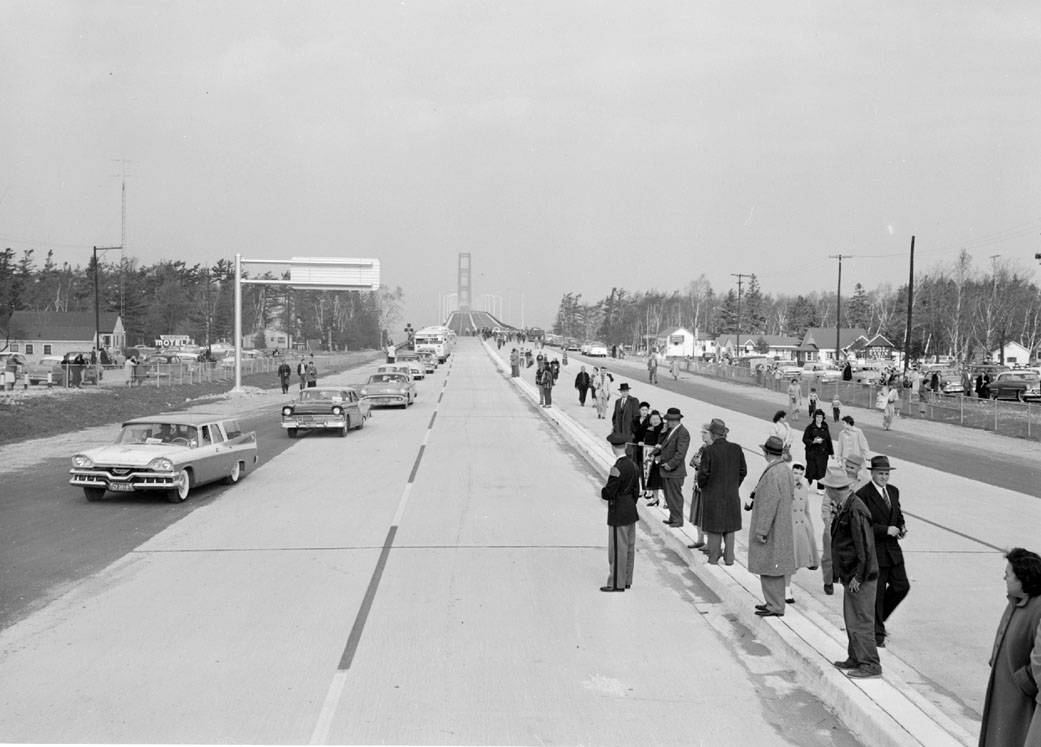
Opening of Mackinac Bridge

- The Mackinac Bridge, the world's longest suspension bridge between anchorages at this time, opened in the United States, to connect Michigan's two peninsulas.
- Yale University commemorated the 100th anniversary year of the birth of former U.S. President William Howard Taft, a Yale alumnus, born on September 15, 1857.
- Died: Charlie Caldwell, 56, American football, basketball and baseball player and coach, died of cancer.

== November 2, 1957 (Saturday) ==
- Marshal Georgy Zhukov, who had been relieved of his position as Soviet Minister of Defence on October 26, was removed from all of his high-level positions in the Communist Party of the Soviet Union.
- A seven-story apartment building in El Manial, Cairo, collapsed, killing 25 people.
- The New Statesman published "Britain and the Nuclear Bombs", an article by J. B. Priestley. Popular response to the article would lead to the foundation of the Campaign for Nuclear Disarmament.
- On the night of November 2–3, a UFO sighting by multiple people occurred west of Levelland, Texas.
- Died:
  - William Coffin Coleman, 87, American businessman and politician, founder of Coleman, died of an acute myocardial infarction.
  - William Haywood, 81, British architect, died of a cerebral haemorrhage.
  - Ted Meredith, 65, American Olympic champion athlete, died after surgery.
  - Tokutomi Sohō (born Tokutomi Iichirō), 94, Japanese journalist and historian
  - Mahonri Young, 80, American sculptor and artist, grandson of Brigham Young, died from bleeding ulcers complicated by pneumonia.

== November 3, 1957 (Sunday) ==
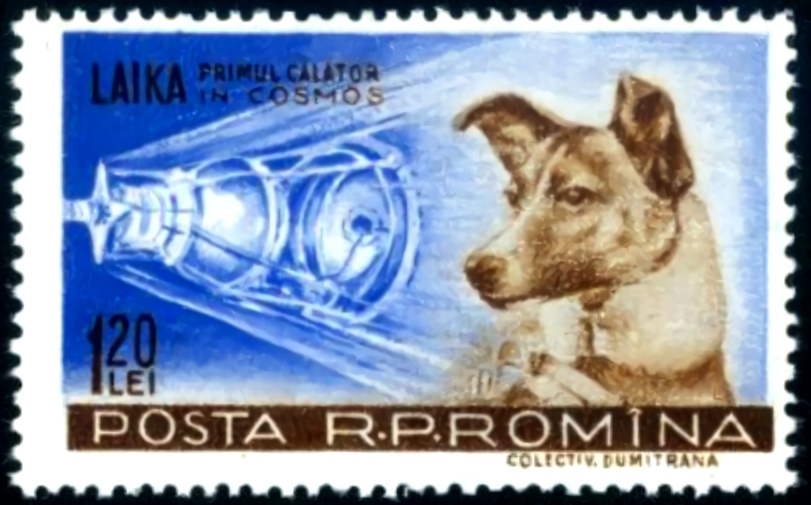
Laika the dog, the first animal to orbit Earth

- The Soviet Union launched Sputnik 2, the second spacecraft in the Sputnik program, with the first animal to orbit the Earth (a dog named Laika) on board. There was no technology available to return her to Earth. The American Society for the Prevention of Cruelty to Animals and other animal rights groups worldwide protested the launching of Laika into space.
- In the 1957 Portuguese legislative election, the ruling National Union won all 120 seats.
- The Roman Catholic Cathedral Basilica of St. Peter in Chains in Cincinnati, Ohio, was rededicated after a $5 million rebuilding project.
- Born: Dolph Lundgren, Swedish actor and martial artist; in Stockholm, Sweden
- Died:
  - Charles Brabin, 75, American director and screenwriter
  - Dick Buek, 27, American Olympic alpine ski racer and stunt pilot, died in an air crash.
  - Linn Enslow, 66, American sanitary engineer and chemist, died of a heart attack.
  - Laika, 2–3, Soviet space dog
  - Wilhelm Reich, 60, Austrian psychoanalyst
  - Giuseppe Di Vittorio, 65, Italian trade union leader and Communist politician, died of a heart attack.

== November 4, 1957 (Monday) ==
- Aeroflot Flight 200, an Ilyushin Il-14 airplane carrying officials of the Romanian Communist Party, crashed at Vnukovo International Airport in Moscow, killing former Foreign Minister Grigore Preoteasa and three crewmembers. Prime Minister Chivu Stoica, future Romanian Communist Party leader and Romanian President Nicolae Ceaușescu, and Party official Leonte Răutu in charge of Agitprop, survived the accident.
- Born:
  - Tony Abbott, 28th Prime Minister of Australia from 2013 to 2015; in Lambeth, London, England
  - Aleksandr Tkachyov, Soviet Olympic champion gymnast; in Semiluki, Voronezh Oblast, Russian Soviet Federative Socialist Republic, Soviet Union
- Died:
  - Joseph Canteloube, 78, French composer and singer
  - Shoghi Effendi, 60, Guardian of the Bahá'í Faith
  - Grigore Preoteasa, 42, Romanian activist, died in an air crash.
  - Thomas Robins, 89, American inventor and manufacturer

== November 5, 1957 (Tuesday) ==
- Two U.S. states, New Jersey and Virginia, voted to elect governors. In the 1957 New Jersey gubernatorial election, incumbent Democrat Robert B. Meyner defeated Republican Malcolm Forbes for the position of Governor of New Jersey. In the 1957 Virginia gubernatorial election, Democrat J. Lindsay Almond, the former Attorney General of Virginia, defeated Republican Virginia State Senator Theodore Roosevelt Dalton for the position of Governor of Virginia.
- Born: Jon-Erik Hexum, American actor; in Englewood, New Jersey (d. 1984, accidental shooting)

== November 6, 1957 (Wednesday) ==
- The Downend air crash in Downend, South Gloucestershire, killed all 15 crewmembers and technicians aboard a prototype Bristol Britannia aircraft and caused injuries to two people on the ground.

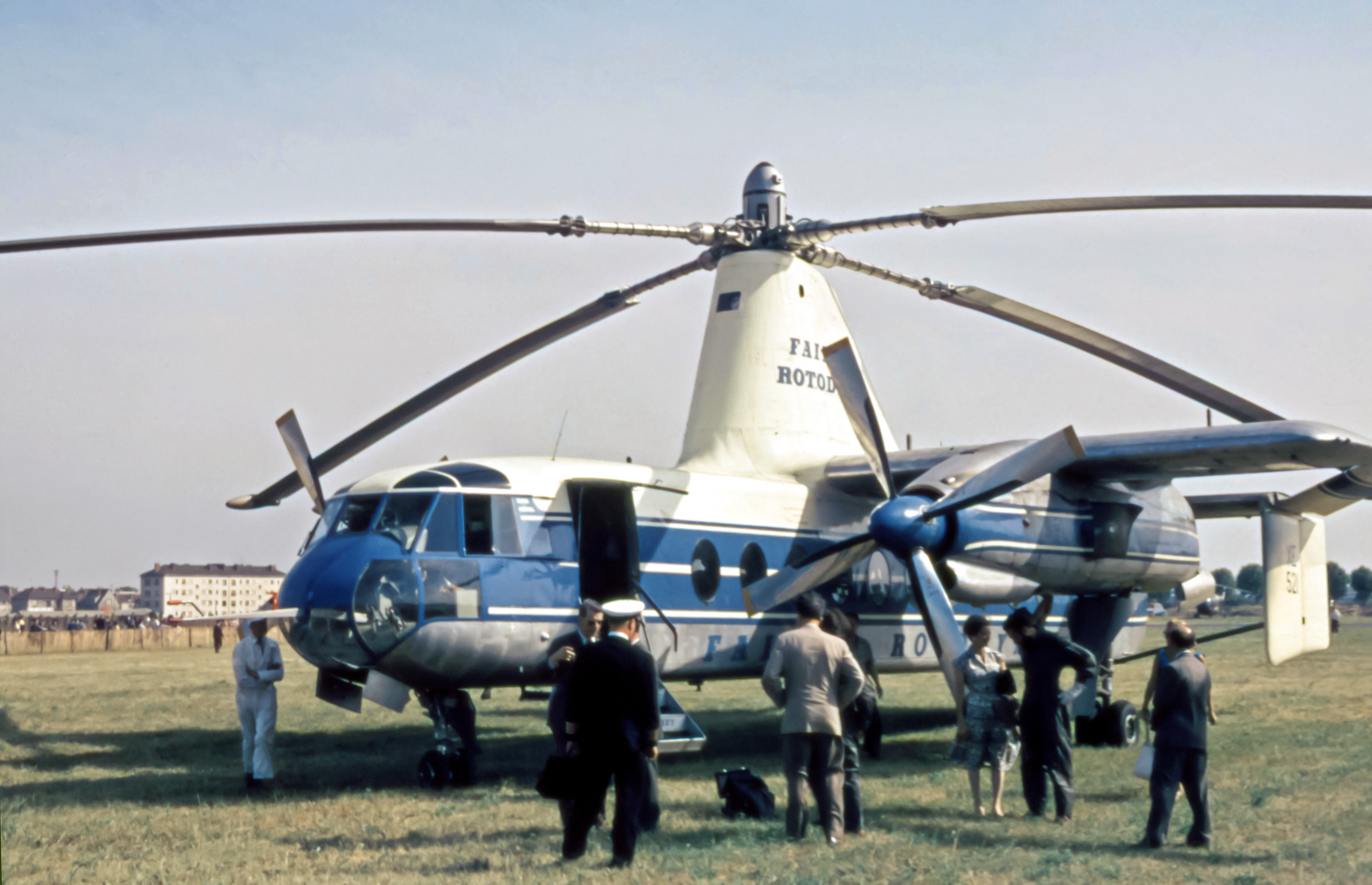
Fairey Rotodyne prototype, c. 1959

- The Fairey Rotodyne compound gyroplane made its first flight, piloted by Squadron Leader W. Ron Gellatly and Lieutenant Commander John G.P. Morton.
- Born:
  - Cam Clarke, American voice actor and singer; in Burbank, California
  - Ciro Gomes, Brazilian lawyer and politician; in Pindamonhangaba, São Paulo, Brazil
  - Klaus Kleinfeld, German business executive; in Bremen, West Germany
  - Lori Singer, American actress and musician; in Corpus Christi, Texas

== November 7, 1957 (Thursday) ==
- The Security Resources Panel of the Office of Defense Mobilization (ODM) Science Advisory Committee submitted the Gaither Report to U.S. President Dwight D. Eisenhower.
- A total lunar eclipse took place.
- Born: Christopher Knight, American actor; in New York City
- Died:
  - Hasui Kawase, 74, Japanese painter and printmaker, died of cancer.
  - Roy Worters, 57, Canadian National Hockey League goaltender, died of throat cancer.

== November 8, 1957 (Friday) ==
- Harold Macmillan, Prime Minister of the United Kingdom, told the House of Commons that the release of radioactive material due to the Windscale fire on October 10 had caused no significant harm to human or animal life or property.
- United States Secretary of Defense Neil McElroy directed the U.S. Army to proceed with the launching of the Explorer earth satellites. This order, in effect, resumed the Orbiter project that had been eliminated from the International Geophysical Year (IGY) satellite planning program on September 9, 1955.
- Warner Bros. released The Story of Mankind, a film adaptation of Hendrik Willem van Loon's book of the same name, directed by Irwin Allen. The New York Times called the film "a protracted and tedious lesson in history that is lacking in punch, sophistication and a consistent point of view."
- Pan Am Flight 7 crashed in the Pacific Ocean en route from San Francisco to Honolulu, killing all 44 people aboard.
- Died: Fred Anderson, 71, American Major League Baseball pitcher, died by suicide.

== November 9, 1957 (Saturday) ==
- Two major opera singers, bass Ezio Flagello and baritone Mario Sereni, both made their debut for the Metropolitan Opera, with Flagello appearing as the jailer in Tosca, and Sereni as Gerard in Andrea Chénier.
- Died:
  - John Bartlet Brebner, 62, Canadian-born American historian
  - Ulric Ellerhusen, 78, German-American sculptor
  - George W. Merck, 63, American chemist and businessman, died of a cerebral hemorrhage.
  - Peter O'Connor, 85, English-born Irish Olympic champion athlete and solicitor
  - Alan Wace, 78, English archaeologist, died of a heart ailment.

== November 10, 1957 (Sunday) ==
- A bus accident killed 27 people in Saint-Paul, Réunion.
- Born: George Lowe, American voice actor and comedian; in Dunedin, Florida
- Died:
  - Louise Carter, 82, American actress
  - Henderson Lovelace Lanham, 69, member of the United States House of Representatives from Georgia, died in a traffic collision.
  - Frank Weil, 63, American lawyer

== November 11, 1957 (Monday) ==
- West Berlin awarded the Freiheitsglocke (Freedom Bell), its highest cultural honor, to singer and actress Lotte Lenya.
- Border campaign (Irish Republican Army): In County Louth, Ireland, four members of the Irish Republican Army and a civilian were killed in a premature land mine explosion.
- Born: Ana Pastor, Spanish politician; in Cubillos, Province of Zamora, Spain
- Died:
  - Masao Maruyama, 68, Japanese general
  - Howard R. Reiter, 86, American football player, coach and athletic director
  - Gerald Burton Winrod, 57, American antisemitic evangelist, author and activist, died of pneumonia.

== November 12, 1957 (Tuesday) ==
- At a meeting of the NACA Subcommittee on Fluid Mechanics on November 12 and 13, it was stated that many aspects of space flight and astronautics would depend heavily on research advances in the field that had been broadly termed fluid mechanics. Research in this area involved internal and external gas flows associated with high-speed flights within the atmosphere and reentry into the atmosphere of spacecraft vehicles. The subcommittee recommended to the NACA that research in these matters be intensified.
- Born: Cécilia Attias (born Cécilia María Sara Isabel Ciganer-Albéniz), wife of French Prime Minister Nicolas Sarkozy; in Boulogne-Billancourt, France
- Died:
  - Ella Bradna, 78, Bohemian-born equestrian circus performer
  - Maxwell M. Hamilton, 60, American diplomat, United States Ambassador to Finland
  - Arthur Asahel Shurcliff (born Arthur Asahel Shurtleff), 87, American landscape architect

== November 13, 1957 (Wednesday) ==
- Flooding in the Po Valley of Italy led to flooding in Venice as well.
- American physicist Gordon Gould, then a graduate student at Columbia University, had a page of his notebook notarized at a candy store. The page contained notes headed, "Some rough calculations on the feasibility of a LASER: Light Amplification by Stimulated Emission of Radiation".
- Paramount Pictures released the aviation drama film Zero Hour!, directed by Hall Bartlett. According to New York Times film critic Bosley Crowther, "This isn't the sort of picture you'd want to see before embarking on a flight, but it is an exciting contemplation of a frightening adventure in the skies." It would be remade in 1980 as the parody film Airplane!
- Born:
  - Greg Abbott, American attorney and politician, 48th Governor of Texas; in Wichita Falls, Texas
  - Stephen Baxter, English science fiction author; in Liverpool, England
  - Roger Ingram, American jazz musician, author, educator and trumpet designer; in Pasadena, California
- Died:
  - Rosamond Marshall, 55, American novelist
  - E. Alexander Powell, 78, American war correspondent, author and explorer, died of coronary thrombosis.
  - Claude U. Stone, 78, American newspaper editor and politician, member of the United States House of Representatives from Illinois
  - Antonín Zápotocký, 72, 6th President and 15th Prime Minister of Czechoslovakia, died of a heart attack.

== November 14, 1957 (Thursday) ==
- State and federal police raided the Apalachin meeting, a summit conference of the American Mafia in Apalachin, New York, arresting 58 organized crime figures.
- Born: Gregg Burge, American tap dancer and choreographer; in Merrick, New York (d. 1998, brain tumor)
- Died:
  - Hettie Gray Baker, 77, American film editor
  - Willie Parau Browne, 73, Cook Islands businessman and politician
  - William Grant Edens, 93, American banker and road advocate
  - Jay McLean, 67, American surgeon, discoverer of heparin

== November 15, 1957 (Friday) ==
- Yugoslavia announced the end of an economic boycott of Francoist Spain (although it did not reinstitute diplomatic relations).
- At the age of 21, Yves Saint Laurent was officially designated to succeed Christian Dior, who had died on October 24, as the head designer of Dior.
- 1957 Aquila Airways Solent crash: A flying boat crash on the Isle of Wight left 45 people dead.
- James Rhyne Killian, president of the Massachusetts Institute of Technology, was sworn in as chairman of the President's Science Advisory Committee.
- A U.S. Air Force Boeing B-29 Superfortress crashed into a mountain about 70 miles (110 km) northeast of Anchorage, Alaska, killing six of the ten people aboard.
- Born:
  - Kevin Eubanks, American jazz guitarist; in Philadelphia, Pennsylvania
  - Jon Grunde Vegard, Norwegian Olympic diver; in Tønsberg, Norway
- Died:
  - John Burnham, 40, designer of USS Nautilus (SSN-571)
  - Andrzej Bursa, 25, Polish poet, died from congenital heart disease.

== November 16, 1957 (Saturday) ==
- American serial killer Ed Gein was arrested at a grocery store near West Plainfield, Wisconsin, after Waushara County sheriff's deputies had discovered the decapitated body of Plainfield hardware store owner Bernice Worden, who had been kidnapped earlier in the day. After a finding that Gein had schizophrenia and was not competent to stand trial, he was committed to the Central State Hospital for the Criminally Insane. Eleven years later, in 1968, following improvement be competent for trial, he would be tried for Mrs. Worden's murder and found to have killed her, but adjudged in a second hearing regarding his mental state at the time as not guilty by reason of insanity. He would spend the rest of his life at Central State Hospital until his death on July 26, 1984.
- A tenement fire in Niagara Falls, New York, killed 17 people, of whom 14 were children, and injured nine others.
- Turkey's Prime Minister Adnan Menderes of the Democrat Party formed a new government of Turkey following the 1957 elections for the Grand National Assembly.
- Born:
  - Jacques Gamblin, French actor; in Granville, Manche, France
  - Cam Clarke, American voice actor
- Died: Seán Moylan, 67, Irish Republican Army officer, Fianna Fáil politician and Senator

== November 17, 1957 (Sunday) ==
- Track and field athlete Zheng Fengrong became the first Chinese woman to hold a world record in sport, as she broke the women's record for the high jump, clearing 1.77 metres (5 ft 10 in) at a meeting in Beijing.
- Died:
  - George M. Fay, 48, American lawyer, United States Attorney for the District of Columbia, died of cancer.
  - Wilson P. Foss Jr., 66, American art collector and businessman, died of cancer.
  - Wooden Joe Nicholas, 74, American jazz trumpeter and cornetist
  - Cora Witherspoon, 67, American actress, died of a heart ailment.

== November 18, 1957 (Monday) ==
- The State Council of the People's Republic of China published new regulations decentralizing the Communist nation's control of most industries, transferring factories to the control of individual provinces.
- At a speech in Moscow at the Meeting of Representatives of Communist and Workers' Parties, during the month of the 40th anniversary of the Russian Revolution of November 7, 1917, Mao Zedong, the Chairman of the Chinese Communist Party, declared that China would overtake the United Kingdom in steel production by 1982.
- The parliaments of Egypt and Syria voted to approve a plan to work towards merging the two nations into a single United Arab Republic (UAR), with the prospect of bringing other Arab nations into the merger. Egypt and Syria would formally create the UAR three months later on February 22, 1958.
- Born: Olivia Heussler, Swiss photojournalist; in Zürich, Switzerland
- Died:
  - Rudolf Diels, 56, German Nazi civil servant and Gestapo chief, died in a hunting accident.
  - Edward Dudley Metcalfe MVO MC, 70, Indian Army officer, equerry of the Duke of Windsor

== November 19, 1957 (Tuesday) ==
- A riot broke out at a professional wrestling match at Madison Square Garden when the team of Dr. Jerry Graham and Dick the Bruiser (William Afflis Jr.) attacked the team of Antonio Rocca and Edouard Carpentier after Graham and Afflis had been disqualified by the referee, Danny Bartfield. During the spontaneous brawl, Rocca and Carpentier were "bloodied up" and "the more violent of the crowd of 12,987 fought their way past the special police" to climb into the ring to attack Afflis, who threw at least two rioters out of the ring. "Rocca, with blood streaming down his face, grabbed the platinum blond-tressed Graham and twice rammed his head on the brass ring post," then was followed by fans who charged at Graham and attacked him before a detail of 30 police restored order.
- Preston R. Bassett of the NACA Committee on Aerodynamics presented a resolution urging the NACA to adopt an aggressive program in space research technology.
- Born:
  - Ofra Haza, Israeli singer; in Hatikva Quarter, Tel Aviv, Israel (d. 2000, complications from AIDS)
  - Tom Virtue, American actor; in Sherman, Texas

== November 20, 1957 (Wednesday) ==
- The University of North Sumatra (Universitas Sumatera Utara), which would have more than 50,000 students by 2017, was founded in Indonesia in the city of Medan.
- The first musical to be based on Mark Twain's novel Adventures of Huckleberry Finn was broadcast on American television as a feature on The United States Steel Hour on the CBS network. Reviews of the one-hour feature (which was based on a portion of the book where Finn encountered two bums who called themselves "the Duke and the Dauphin") were mixed, with critic Harriet Van Horne commenting that "the spirit of what Twain called his 'hymn in prose form' was there intact. And it was heightened by a musical score that was sheer delight." Another critic praised it as "the greatest single hour of television so far this season", while New York Times critic Jack Gould said that the show "was a wildly improbable and totally inept version of an episode in the Mark Twain classic."
- Born:
  - Stefan Bellof, German racing driver; in Giessen, West Germany (d. 1985, race crash)
  - John Eriksen, Danish footballer; in Assens, Denmark (d. 2002, accidental fall)
  - Goodluck Jonathan, 14th President of Nigeria; in Otueke, Ogbia, Eastern Region, British Nigeria
  - Sophie Lorain, Canadian actress, director and producer; in Montreal, Quebec
- Died:
  - Mstislav Dobuzhinsky, 82, Russian and Lithuanian artist and scenic designer
  - Augustine B. Kelley, 74, member of the United States House of Representatives from Pennsylvania
  - Gerard Swope, 84, American electronics businessman, president of General Electric

== November 21, 1957 (Thursday) ==
- French troops killed 42 Algerian rebels and captured 10. Six French soldiers were killed.
- The National Advisory Committee for Aeronautics (NACA) established a Special Committee on Space Technology to study and delineate problem areas that must be solved to make space flight a practical reality and to consider and recommend means for attacking these problems. Dr. H. Guyford Stever of the Massachusetts Institute of Technology was named chairman.
- The Rocket and Satellite Research Panel recommended the creation of a National Space Establishment in the Executive Branch of the U.S. Government. According to the proposal, activities of this agency would be under civilian leadership, and the organization would be charged with formulating and supervising a space research program. An annual budget of $1 billion for a period of 10 years was recommended.
- Over one-half of the NACA Propulsion Conference on November 21 and 22 was devoted to the discussion of possible space propulsion systems. Three particular systems appeared to afford excellent choices for such purposes. These were: the chemical rocket, the nuclear rocket, and the nuclear electric rocket. It was the considered opinion of the conference members that the chemical rocket would be quite adequate for a round trip to the Moon.
- Died:
  - James C. Crumlish, 63, judge of the Pennsylvania Court of Common Pleas
  - Cary A. Hardee, 81, American educator, lawyer and banker, 23rd Governor of Florida
  - Francis Burton Harrison, 83, American statesman, member of the United States House of Representatives from New York, Governor-General of the Philippines, died of a heart ailment.
  - Arthur A. Koscinski, 70, Polish-born United States federal judge

== November 22, 1957 (Friday) ==
- Nikita Khrushchev, the leader of the Soviet Union as First Secretary of the Soviet Communist Party, gave a rare interview to Western journalists, allowing three American reporters, (William Randolph Hearst Jr., Bob Considine and Frank Conniff) to ask questions. Khrushchev used the opportunity to accuse the U.S. defense forces of having "military psychosis", noting that the U.S. had its strategic bomber forces, armed with thermonuclear weapons, with shifts of bombers airborne at all hours. Khrushchev noted that "This is very dangerous. There is always the possibility of a mental blackout when the pilot may take the slightest signal as a signal for action and fly to the target he had been instructed to fly to," and that "Does this not go to show that in such a case a war may start as a result of a sheer misunderstanding, a derangement in the normal psychic state of a person, which may happen to anybody?"
- For the first time in ice hockey history, a Soviet Russian team came to Canada to play against a Canadian team. A sellout crowd of 14,327 packed the Maple Leaf Gardens in Toronto to see the Whitby Dunlops, an amateur team, defeat the "Moscow Selects", 7 to 2. While the Soviet and Canadian national teams had played against each other in the 1956 Winter Olympics in Italy, and humbled the Canadian team on the way to winning the gold medal, no Soviet team had ever come to Canada. The Moscow team, playing their first of seven games on their tour of Canada, included six of their 1956 gold medalists and, as one observer noted, "thousands" of the spectators "wondered how the Soviets beat Canada in the 1956 Olympics."
- Born:
  - Glen Clark, Canadian politician, 31st Premier of British Columbia; in Nanaimo, British Columbia
  - Franco Lovignana, bishop of the Roman Catholic Diocese of Aosta; in Aosta, Italy
  - Don Newman, American basketball coach and player; in New Orleans, Louisiana (d. 2018, brain cancer)
  - Alan Stern, American engineer and planetary scientist, principal investigator of NASA's New Horizons mission to Pluto; in New Orleans, Louisiana
- Died:
  - Henry Moore, 10th Earl of Drogheda KCMG PC, 73, British Army officer and barrister
  - Francis Henry Taylor, 54, American museum director and curator, died after surgery.

== November 23, 1957 (Saturday) ==
- A group of several hundred guerrillas from the Moroccan Army of Liberation, a group of militias seeking to liberate the North African nation of Morocco from Spanish and French control, began the Ifni War with an attack on border posts at Ifni, a Spanish-territorial enclave in south Morocco. The war would last until June 30, 1958.
- Born: William Kaelin Jr., American cellular biologist, Nobel Prize laureate; in New York City
- Died:
  - William W. Arnold, 80, American politician and jurist, member of the United States House of Representatives from Illinois
  - Ethel Jackson, 80, American actress
  - Elia Abu Madi, 67, Lebanese-born American poet, died of coronary thrombosis.

== November 24, 1957 (Sunday) ==
- Speaking in Boston, U.S. Senator John F. Kennedy said that there was no reason a Roman Catholic could not abide by the oath of office of the president of the United States. Kennedy would be elected as the first Catholic U.S. President in November 1960.
- Born: Denise Crosby (Star Trek: The Next Generation, Pet Sematary), American actress; in Hollywood, Los Angeles, California
- Died:
  - Sir Godfrey Baring, 1st Baronet KBE, DL, JP, 86, former Member of Parliament
  - George T. Bye (born George Thurman Bindbeutel), 70, American literary agent, died of cancer.
  - Wilford Conrow, 77, American portraitist
  - Prince George of Greece and Denmark, 88, high commissioner of the Cretan State
  - Diego Rivera, 70, Mexican painter, died of cancer.
  - Sir Alfred Eckhard Zimmern, 78, English classical scholar and historian, died of uremia following cerebral thrombosis.

== November 25, 1957 (Monday) ==
- U.S. President Dwight D. Eisenhower suffered a mild stroke during a Cabinet meeting.
- Died:
  - George Davis, 51, American editor and novelist, husband of Lotte Lenya, died of a heart attack.
  - Raymond Griffith, 62, American actor, died of asphyxia.
  - Peter B. Kyne, 77, American novelist
  - Sir Ernest Oppenheimer, 77, KStJ, German-born South African mining entrepreneur
  - William V. Pratt, 88, American admiral

== November 26, 1957 (Tuesday) ==
- For almost eight hours, U.S. Vice-President Richard Nixon participated in White House discussions about issues arising from President Eisenhower's illness. The stock market dropped in the wake of Eisenhower's stroke.
- 2,000 people attended the burial of artist Diego Rivera in the Rotunda of Illustrious Sons at the Panteón de Dolores in Mexico City.
- Members of the United States Congress were present for a failed test of a Jupiter missile at Cape Canaveral, Florida.
- Born:
  - Kevin Kamenetz, American politician; in Lochearn, Maryland (d. 2018, cardiac arrest)
  - Matthias Reim, German singer-songwriter; in Korbach, West Germany
- Died:
  - Billy Bevan, 70, Australian actor
  - Aleksey Remizov, 80, Russian author and calligrapher
  - Petros Voulgaris, 74, former Prime Minister of Greece, died of a heart ailment.

== November 27, 1957 (Wednesday) ==
- The United Kingdom and the United States finalized an agreement with the Soviet Union for mutual inspection of the UK-U.S. ZETA (Zero Energy Thermonuclear Assembly) fusion reactor at the British Atomic Energy Research Establishment (AERE), located in Harwell, Oxfordshire.
- De Kuip, the 64,000-seat stadium for the Netherlands soccer football club Feyenoord, hosted its first night game after becoming one of the first European stadiums to install permanent floodlights. A crowd of 46,000 watched as Feyenoord lost, 3 to 0, to the visiting British team, Bolton Wanderers.
- The McDonnell F-101 Voodoo supersonic U.S. jet fighter set a record by flying from Los Angeles to New York in 3 hours and 7 minutes, after having flown from New York to L.A. in 3 hours, 36 minutes.
- The "Chirping" Crickets, the first, and only album for Buddy Holly and The Crickets, was released.
- Born:
  - Kenny Acheson, Irish race car driver; in Cookstown, Northern Ireland
  - Edda Heiðrún Backman, Icelandic actress, singer, director and artist; in Akranes, Iceland (d. 2016, ALS)
  - Caroline Kennedy, American author, attorney and daughter of 35th President John F. Kennedy; in New York City

== November 28, 1957 (Thursday) ==
- The British Government announced that the naval dockyard in Hong Kong would close by November 30, 1959.
- The second of two Rolls-Royce Thrust Measuring Rigs, pioneering VTOL aircraft, crashed during a tethered test flight in Hucknall, Nottinghamshire, killing the pilot, 41-year-old Wing Commander H. G. F. Larsen.
- Died: Pinkhos Churgin, 63, Israeli scholar, president of Bar-Ilan University, died of a stomach ailment.

== November 29, 1957 (Friday) ==
- A fire started by a clothes iron in the tailor's shop of Oakwood Hospital in Maidstone, Kent, England, caused the central tower of the hospital to collapse after the fire was under control, killing three firefighters, a patient, and two hospital staff members. 15 people were injured.
- The U.S. Air Force unveiled the pressure suit to be used for its X-15 flight program.
- Born: Janet Napolitano, American politician, lawyer and university administrator, 21st Governor of Arizona, 3rd United States Secretary of Homeland Security; in New York City
- Died:
  - Willard C. Brinton, 76, American consulting engineer, died of a heart attack.
  - John P. Frey, 86, American labor leader
  - Erich Wolfgang Korngold, 60, Austrian composer
  - Adeodato Giovanni Piazza, O.C.D., 73, Italian Roman Catholic friar and cardinal
  - Michael Dov Weissmandl, 54, Hungarian-born Orthodox rabbi

== November 30, 1957 (Saturday) ==
- Indonesian president Sukarno survived a grenade attack at the Cikini School in Jakarta, but several children were killed.
- 1957 New Zealand general election: The Labour Party defeated the governing National Party, with Walter Nash succeeding Keith Holyoake as prime minister.
- In Norwalk, Connecticut, Governor Abraham Ribicoff dedicated the 1,000-foot (300 m) Yankee Doodle Bridge over the Norwalk River.
- In what The New York Times called a "freakish mishap", 32-year-old Patrolman Joseph L. Rauchut of the New York City Police Department died during a traffic stop on the Queens side of the Kosciusko Bridge when a truck struck his parked patrol car, which struck and killed him.
- At Varsity Stadium in Toronto, the Hamilton Tiger-Cats defeated the Winnipeg Blue Bombers by a score of 32–7 to win the 45th Grey Cup. During the game, a Winnipeg fan tripped Hamilton safety Bibbles Bawel while he was returning an interception. Winnipeg received a penalty of half the distance to the goal line.
- Born:
  - Djibril Bassolé, Burkinabé politician and diplomat; in Nouna, French Upper Volta
  - Joël Champetier, French-Canadian science fiction and fantasy author; in La Corne, Quebec (d. 2015, cancer)
  - Colin Mochrie, Scottish-born Canadian comedian; in Kilmarnock, Ayrshire, Scotland
  - Margaret Spellings (born Margaret M. Dudar), American government and non-profit executive, 8th United States Secretary of Education; in Ann Arbor, Michigan
- Died:
  - Beniamino Gigli, 67, Italian operatic tenor, died of pneumonia.
  - Simone Silva, 29, Egyptian-born French actress, died of a stroke.
  - Laurence Todd, 74, American journalist, correspondent for TASS
