= Sanitary engineer =

A sanitary engineer may be either:

- a highly trained professional in the field of sanitary engineering
- a humorous euphemism for a waste collector, a field of work that requires less specialized education
