= John Burnham =

John Burnham may refer to:

- John Burnham (cricketer) (1839–1914), English cricketer
- John Burnham (submarine designer) (1917–1957), designer of USS Nautilus
- John Chynoweth Burnham (1929–2017), American historian
- John Fremont Burnham (1856–?), member of the Wisconsin State Assembly
- John Burnham (Canadian politician) (1842–1897), Canadian physician and politician from Ontario
- John Hampden Burnham (1860–1940), Canadian politician and lawyer
- John de Burnham (died 1363), English born judge and official in Ireland
- Jack Burnham (footballer) (John Robert Burnham, 1896–1973), English footballer

== See also ==
- John Brunham, merchant and mayor of King's Lynn
