= Abel Wolman =

American engineer and academic (1892–1989)

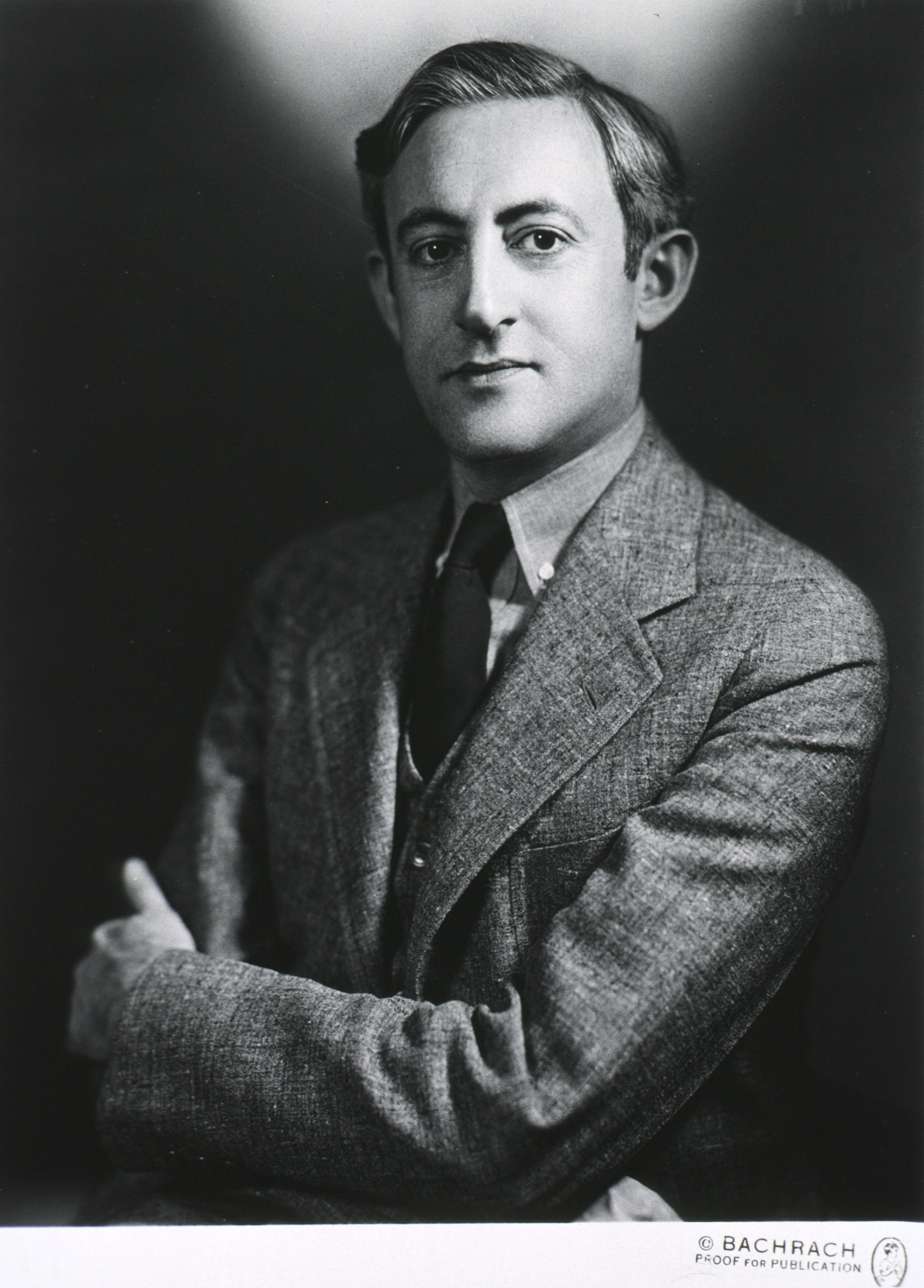
- Portrait of Abel Wolman
- Born: June 10, 1892; Baltimore, Maryland, US
- Died: February 22, 1989 (aged 96); Baltimore, Maryland, US
- Education: Johns Hopkins University
- Known for: Research to standardize the methods used to chlorinate drinking-water.
- Awards: National Medal of Science (1974); Tyler Prize for Environmental Achievement (1976); Robert E. Horton Medal (1986)
- Scientific career
- Fields: Sanitary engineering
- Workplaces: Johns Hopkins University

Abel Wolman (June 10, 1892 – February 22, 1989) was an American engineer, educator and pioneer of modern sanitary engineering. His professional career left impacts in academia, sanitary engineering research, environmental and public health services, engineering professional societies, and journal publications. Wolman is best known for his research with Linn Enslow in the chlorination of Baltimore's municipal water supply, which has contributed to the distribution of safe municipal water supplies globally.

== Biography ==
=== Early life and education ===
Abel Wolman was born to Louis and Rose Wachsman Wolman on June 10, 1892 in Baltimore, Maryland. He was the fourth eldest child of Polish-Jewish immigrants. Wolman received his high school education from the Baltimore City College in 1909. Following his high school education, Wolman received his Bachelor of Arts in 1913 as a pre-med major. Although Wolman was interested in becoming a doctor, his mother's insistence on studying engineering led him to pursue a degree in engineering. He then went on to complete a Bachelor of Science in Engineering at the Johns Hopkins University, graduating in 1915 as the fourth person to receive a degree at the newly-established Whiting School of Engineering. Although Wolman did not complete a doctorate degree, his work in the field of sanitary engineering led to him being awarded an honorary Doctor of Engineering in 1937. Wolman was also awarded a Doctor of Humane Letters from the Maryland Institute College of Arts and a Doctor of Law by the Johns Hopkins University in 1969.

=== Career ===
==== Public health ====
Wolman served an extensive career in sanitary engineering, working in both environmental and public health services as well as in academics. In 1914, he started his long career in public health as an assistant engineer working for the United States Public Health Service. In 1922, Wolman became the Chief Engineer of the Maryland State Department of Health, where he served for 18 years until 1939. He also held various consultancy positions as an consulting engineer for public health organizations, including but not limited to the United States Public Health Service and the United States Army Corps of Engineers from 1927 to 1944 and the United States delegate to the International Health Conference from 1946 to 1950.

While working in the public health sector, Wolman conducted research related to sanitation and public health. He is best known for his 1919 contribution, with chemist Linn Enslow, in the standardization of chlorinating Baltimore's drinking-water supply. His efforts there helped develop the plan for Baltimore's water supply so thoroughly and effectively that it remains well-provided for growth through the 21st century. His work also benefited water systems in New York, Detroit and Columbus, Ohio.

==== Academia ====
In 1937, Wolman started his official academic career at Johns Hopkins University when he was made Professor of Sanitary Engineering at the Whiting School of Engineering and the Johns Hopkins School of Hygiene and Public Health, and his academic career did not end until his death in 1989 at the age of 96. At that same time, he served as the Department of Sanitary Engineering's chairman until his official retirement in 1962. During his time as a sanitary engineering lecturer, he was asked to lecture at many prestigious universities, including Harvard University, Princeton University, University of Southern California, and University of Chicago. He was appointed Professor Emeritus in 1962, but had no desire to retire from professional life, so he continued his teaching and research in addition to serving as a consultant to the many governments and municipalities that requested his advice and assistance.

==== Professional societies ====
Supplementing his professional life, Wolman also held many important positions in the committees of professional societies and journal publications. In 1916, he joined the American Public Health Association as an associate editor of the organization's monthly publication, American Journal of Public Health, where he eventually became the editor in 1955 until 1957. Within the American Public Health Association, Wolman served as Chairman of the Public Health Engineering Section and Chairman of the Committee on Research and Standards. He was also involved heavily with the American Water Works Association, a close affiliate with the American Public Health Association, where Wolman served as the editor of the organization's journal, the Journal of the American Water Works Association, from 1921 to 1937 and eventually became the President of the organization in 1942.

=== Personal life and death ===
Wolman married Anna Gordon in 1919. Through their marriage, Wolman had one son, named Markley (M.) Gordon Wolman. Maintaining a lively and witty personality, Wolman was favorable amongst many of the students he interacted with as a professor. From colleagues and family members that knew Wolman well, he has been described as being very well-organized and always perceptive towards his problems and analyses related to work. Wolman's wife Anna died December 31, 1983. Wolman died at his home in Baltimore, Maryland on February 22, 1989, aged 96 years old.

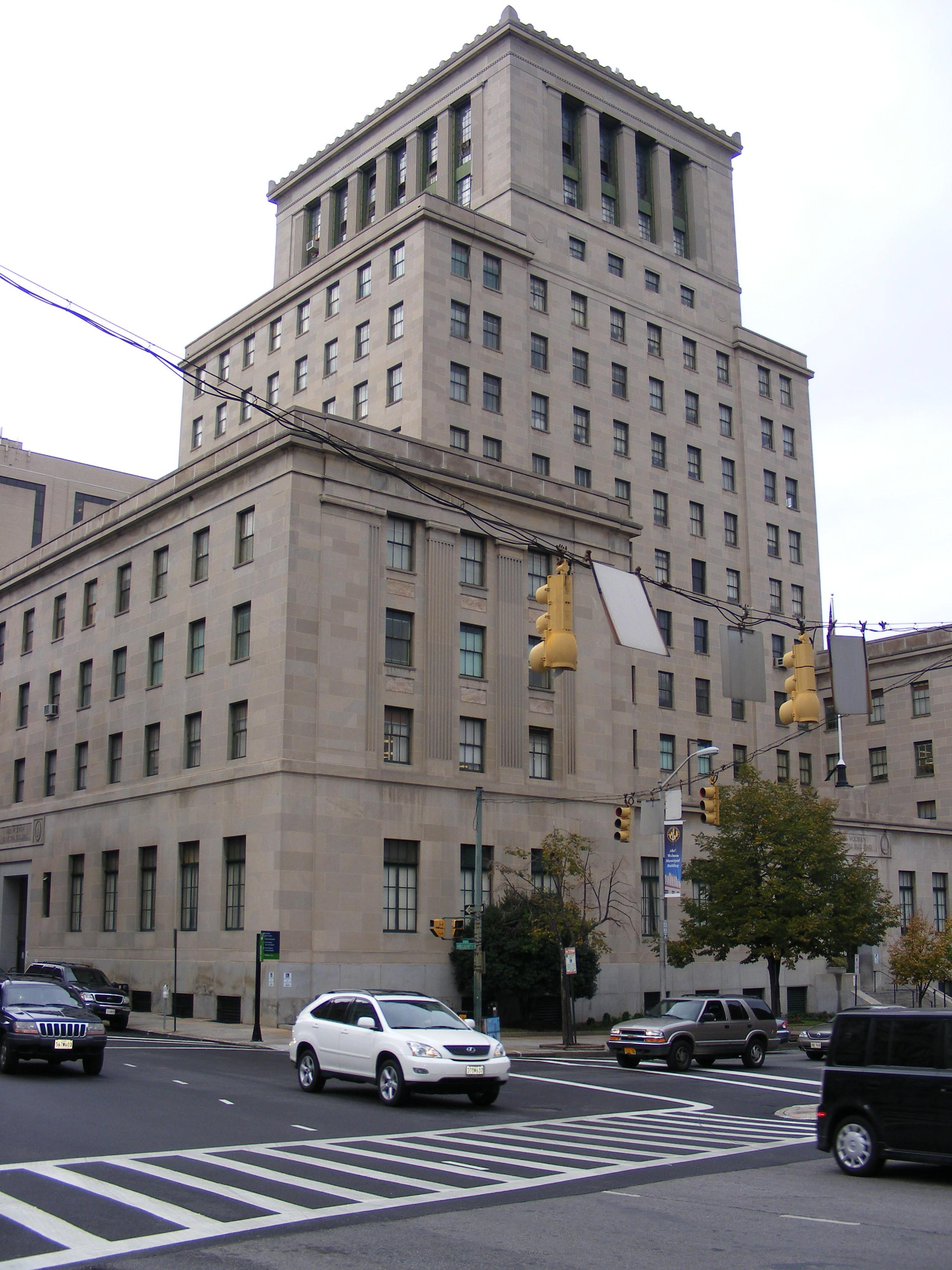
The Abel Wolman Municipal Building, Baltimore, Maryland 39.328925°N 76.617°W

== Major accomplishments ==
=== Research publications ===
==== "Chlorine Absorption and the Chlorination of Water" (September 1918) ====
In collaboration with Linn Enslow, Wolman wanted to standardize a chlorination method to purify municipal water supplies. At the time, the purification of water with chlorine was known and employed in cities, but the problem that Wolman and Enslow highlighted in this publication was that the dosage of chlorine used by cities were unreliable and unscientific. As a result, municipal water supplies were often incorrectly purified, leading to failures in performance marked by diseases.

Wolman and Enslow began their experiment by describing their observations on the rate of chlorine absorption in different water samples that varied in bacteria, color, turbidity, oxidizable compounds, and other purity factors. After performing thorough statistical analyses on their observed rates of chlorine absorption, Wolman and Enslow proposed a chemical technique to determine the effective disinfection dosage to eliminate bacterial life in the water, which continues to be used in many of today's municipal water supplies.

==== "The Metabolism of Cities" (September 1965) ====
In "The Metabolism of Cities", Wolman highlighted three major "metabolic" problems that plagued major cities in the United States and offered his insight on the reality of those problems and possible solutions. He defined the metabolic requirements of a city as all materials and commodities needed to sustain its population, including all processes related to the proper removal and disposal of waste products produced in daily life. However, he pointed out that many major US cities share three metabolic problems: (1) lack of an adequate water supply, (2) ineffective disposal of sewage, and (3) poor control of air pollution. Throughout most of the paper, Wolman provided relevant statistics and figures to underscore the proposed metabolic problems and analyzed historical municipal proposals designed to alleviate those metabolic problems. He concluded the article on a somewhat optimistic note, mentioning that the future of water sanitation, sewage disposal, and eliminating air pollutants is hopeful. However, in order to reach that future, Wolman called for immediate action and planning of policies and programs needed to combat the three metabolic problems.

Since the publication of this paper, there have been many studies performed to develop viable solutions to tackle the water shortages, waste disposal, and air pollution issues proposed by Wolman. For example, in 1999, civil and environmental engineers at the University of California, Berkeley published a research paper that confirmed the presence of water shortages in the United States and advocated for cities to take water recycling and reuse measures.

=== Honors and awards ===
For his efforts in public health practices and engineering skills on a local and global level, Wolman was granted multiple awards. In 1948, Wolman was awarded the Sedgwick Memorial Medal by the American Public Health Association for his contributions in the field of public health. In 1960, he was awarded the Albert Lasker Special Award in Public Health, which is an award "for outstanding contributions in research related to diseases which are the main causes of death and disability and for distinguished service in the field of public health administration. In 1967, Wolman was awarded the William Procter Prize for Scientific Achievement for his contributions in the field of science. In 1968, Wolman was awarded the first Lewis L. Dollinger Pure Environment Award. In 1973, Wolman was awarded the Milton Stover Eisenhower Medal. In 1974, Wolman was awarded the National Medal of Science. In 1976, Wolman was awarded the Tyler Prize for Environmental Achievement and the Ben Gurion Award. Both in 1973 and 1977, Wolman was awarded the American Water Works Association Award. In 1986, Wolman was awarded the Robert E. Horton Medal and the John Wesley Powell Award. Finally, in 1999, The Baltimore Sun named Wolman "Marylander of the Century". In regards to professional societies, Wolman was awarded with honorary memberships in the American Society of Civil Engineers, the American Academy of Environmental Engineers, the Water Pollution Control Federation, the American Water Resources Association, the American Academy of Environmental Engineers, the Franklin Institute, and the Technion of Haifa Board of Directors.

== Legacy ==
=== Academic and social tributes ===
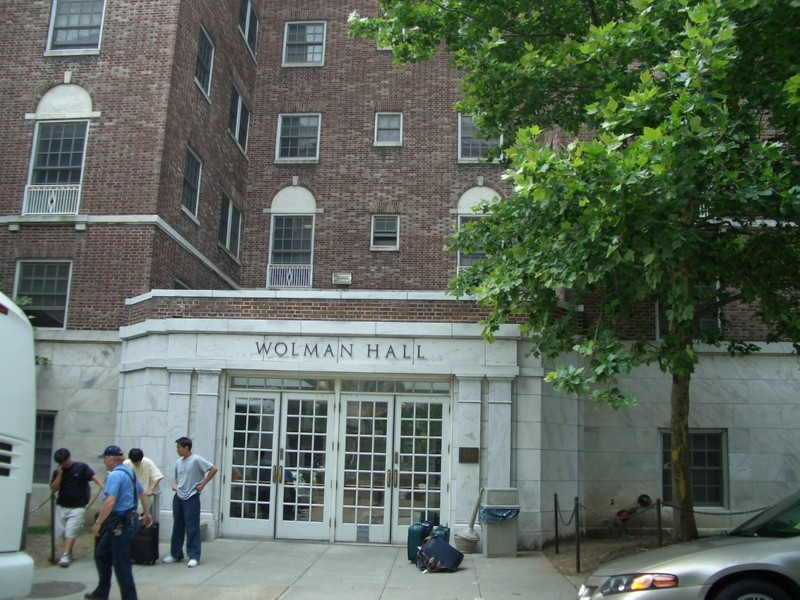
Wolman Hall is a dormitory building for first-year students at The Johns Hopkins University.

Following the death of Wolman, multiple tributes were created in his honor. For individuals that work in the water industry, the American Water Works Association annually presents the Abel Wolman Award of Excellence since 1985. In May 1966, the Johns Hopkins University named a newly acquired dormitory Wolman Hall, which continues to house first year students. In 1986, the City of Baltimore renamed its public works building to the Abel Wolman Municipal Building, honoring his years of service to the city. Today, the Abel Wolman Municipal Building is where citizens of Baltimore come to pay their property taxes, parking fines and metered water bills.[1]

== Bibliography ==
- Chlorine absorption and chlorination of water. With L. H. Enslow (J. Ind. Eng. Chem. 11:206-13. 1919)
