= Linn Enslow =

- Born: Linn Harrison Enslow; February 26, 1891; Richmond, Virginia, US
- Died: November 3, 1957 (aged 66); Dublin, Virginia, US
- Education: Johns Hopkins University
- Known for: with Abel Wolman, standardized the methods used to chlorinate drinking water
- Scientific career
- Fields: sanitary engineering, chemistry

Linn Harrison Enslow (February 26, 1891 – November 3, 1957) was an American sanitary engineer and chemist, most famous for his work with Abel Wolman developing chlorination systems in Baltimore.

== Life ==
Enslow was born in Richmond, Virginia, to Linn Bliss Enslow and Marie (née Harrison) Enslow, the eldest of six children.

He died of a heart attack on his farm in Dublin, Virginia in 1957; at the time, he resided in Queens, New York, and was working as editor of the magazine Water and Sewage Works. He was buried in New Dublin Presbyterian Church Cemetery in Dublin, Virginia.

== Work ==
While studying chemistry at Johns Hopkins, he met Abel Wolman; together, the two devised a formula to appropriately chlorinate drinking water, depending on factors such as acidity. Between the time of discovery in 1919 and 1941, eighty-five percent of American water systems were using chlorination.
