= Codogno rail crash =

1957 railway incident in Italy

Coordinates: 45°09′36″N 09°41′44″E

Details
- Date: 9 December 1957
- Location: Codogno
- Country: Italy
- Line: Milano–Bologna
- Operator: Ferrovie dello Stato
- Incident type: Level crossing collision

Statistics
- Trains: 1
- Deaths: 15
- Injured: 30

The Codogno rail crash happened at Codogno, Italy, in the early evening of 9 December 1957. Fifteen people were killed, and at least 30 were seriously injured.

At 18:19 on 9 December 1957, the Milan–Rome express, while travelling through Codogno at a speed of 130 km/h (81 mph), struck a truck loaded with bran, which had become stuck at a level crossing. The train then derailed and brought down a cast iron pylon.

Fifteen people, including several truck drivers, were killed, and more than 30 other people were injured.
