= Louise Zabriskie =

Founder and director of Maternity Consultation Service

Louise Zabriskie (1887 – 12 December 1957) was a registered nurse and the founder and director of Maternity Consultation Service, which offered free health services to expectant mothers in Manhattan. She authored textbooks on nursing and obstetrics, including the well regarded Nurses Handbook of Obstetrics, as well as the popular pre-natal and early parenting manual Mother and Baby Care in Pictures.

== Career ==
Louise Zabriskie was born in Preston City, Connecticut. She attended Northfield Seminary and Columbia University, and received her nursing degree from the New York Hospital Training School for Nurses, now the Cornell University - New York Hospital School of Nursing. In 1913 she began working at the New York Lying-In Hospital, where she was as a public health nurse and later night supervisor until 1916. In 1922 Zabriskie was seriously injured in a car accident, breaking her neck, and was subsequently paralyzed from the neck down. Despite this accident she continued teaching, first by conducting lectures at her bedside, and later returning to lectures at New York University School of Nursing, which is now the New York University Rory Meyers College of Nursing. In 1939 Zabriskie became the founder and director of Maternity Consultation Service, where she worked for 18 years.

== Publications ==
Zabriskie, Louise; Eastman, Nicholson J; McManus, Rachel Louise (Metcalfe) (1929). Nurses handbook of obstetrics. Philadelphia: Lippincott. OCLC 10956550.

Zabriskie, Louise (1935). Mother and baby care in pictures. Philadelphia; Montreal: J.B. Lippincott Co.

Zabriskie, Louise; Trabb. I (1944). Los signos neurológicos en pediatría (in Spanish). Buenos aires: Guillermo Kraft.

Zabriskie, Louise (1946). Common sense in training baby. New York, N.Y.: Chicopee Sales Corp. OCLC 214329980.
