= Peter Brown (Australian footballer, born 1957) =

Australian rules footballer

Personal information
- Full name: Peter Brown
- Born: 8 December 1957 (age 68)
- Original team: Scotch College

Playing career^{1}
Years	Club	Games (Goals)
1977–80	Fitzroy	44 (16)
- ^{1} Playing statistics correct to the end of 1980.

Peter Brown (born 8 December 1957) is a former Australian rules footballer who played for Fitzroy in the Victorian Football League (VFL) between 1977 and 1980. He then played with Glenelg in the South Australian National Football League in 1981, playing 14 games and kicking 16 goals, before he returned to Melbourne and played for Old Scotch in the Victorian Amateur Football Association.
