= Mike South =

American pornographer (born 1957)

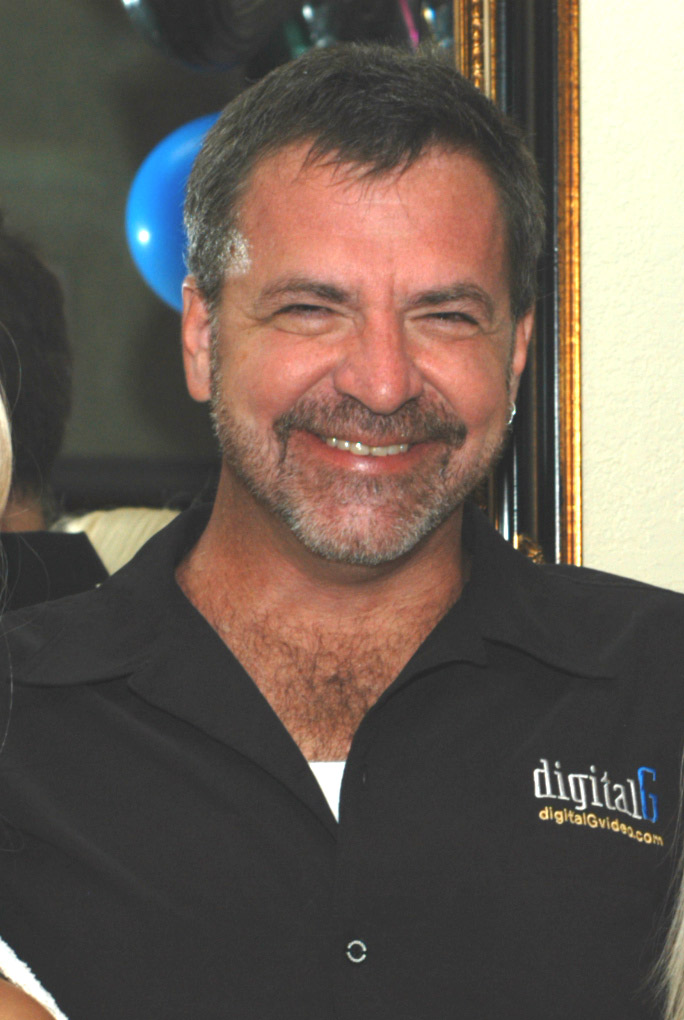
- Born: Mike Strother; December 26, 1957 (age 68); Atlanta, Georgia, U.S.
- Height: 6 ft 1 in (185 cm)
- Website: MikeSouth.com

Mike South (born December 26, 1957, in Atlanta, Georgia) is an American pornographic actor, director, blogger and pornography gossip columnist.

Prior to entering the adult industry he worked for NASA at Kennedy Space Center in Florida.

He was an AVN Award winning Producer/Director but became best known for his eponymous blog and his outspoken activism in the adult Industry. In 2013, CNBC listed him as "one of porn's ten most powerful people", stating "His style is unique, but he is also a leading agent of change within the industry."

Two of the films he directed have won AVN Awards for Best Amateur Release - Southern Belles 4 in 1997 and Southern Belles 8 in 1998.

In May 2007 South underwent surgery to remove a nerve-sheath tumor.
