= 1957 Sydney to Hobart Yacht Race =

Annual yacht race in Australia

13th Sydney to Hobart Yacht Race
Date	26 December 1957 – 3 January 1958
Number of yachts	20
Winner	Kurrewa IV
Official website	https://web.archive.org/web/20091030152304/http://rolexsydneyhobart.com/default.asp

The 1957 Sydney to Hobart Yacht Race, was the 13th annual running of the "blue water classic" Sydney to Hobart Yacht Race.

Hosted by the Cruising Yacht Club of Australia based in Sydney, New South Wales, the 1957 edition began on Sydney Harbour, at noon on Boxing Day (26 December), before heading south for 630 nautical miles (1,170 km) through the Tasman Sea, past Bass Strait, into Storm Bay and up the River Derwent, to cross the finish line in Hobart, Tasmania.

The 1957 Sydney to Hobart Yacht Race comprised a fleet of 20 competitors, a decrease of 8 yachts from the number in the 1956 race. Line-honours were awarded to Kurrewa IV, which raced out of New South Wales and was owned and skippered by brother's J. & F. Livingston.

== 1957 fleet ==
20 yachts registered to begin the 1956 Sydney to Hobart Yacht race. They are:

Yacht	Owner
Kurrewa IV	J. & F.Livingston
Bintang	
Caprice of Huon	
Catriona	D.M. Brown
Defiance	
Eos	
Four Winds	
Janzoon	
Kismet	
Anitra V	Trgyve & Magnus Halvorsen
Lolita	
Metung	
Nirvana	
Patience	
Samuel Pepys	
Solo	
Southern Myth	
Tahuna	
Trade Winds	
Winston Churchill	

== Results ==
Line Honours	LH (elapsed) time d:hh:mm:ss	Handicap winner	HW (corrected) time d:hh:mm:ss
Kurrewa IV	3:18:30	Anitra	3:00:55:37

== See also ==
- Sydney to Hobart Yacht Race
