= Ian Richards (English cricketer) =

English cricketer

Personal information
- Full name: Ian Michael Richards
- Born: 9 December 1957 (age 68); Stockton-on-Tees, County Durham, England
- Batting: Left-handed
- Bowling: Right-arm medium

Domestic team information
- Years: Team
- 1981–1982: Durham
- 1976–1979: Northamptonshire

Career statistics
Competition	First-class	List A
Matches	23	11
Runs scored	467	53
Batting average	22.23	8.83
100s/50s	–/1	–/–
Top score	50	18
Balls bowled	372	150
Wickets	7	2
Bowling average	28.71	76.00
5 wickets in innings	–	–
10 wickets in match	–	–
Best bowling	4/57	1/22
Catches/stumpings	5/–	2/–
- Source: Cricinfo, 31 August 2011

Ian Michael Richards (born 9 December 1957) is a former English cricketer. Richards was a left-handed batsman who bowled right-arm medium pace. He was born in Stockton-on-Tees, County Durham.

Richards made his first-class debut for Northamptonshire against Oxford University in 1976. He played first-class cricket for Northamptonshire from 1976 to 1979, making 23 first-class appearances. In his first-class career for the county, he scored 467 runs at an average of 22.23, with a high score of 50. This score, his only first-class fifty, came against Nottinghamshire in 1976. With the ball, he took 7 wickets at a bowling average of 28.71, with best figures of 4/57. His List A debut also came in 1976, when Northamptonshire played Nottinghamshire in the John Player League. Richards made nine further List A appearances for the county, the last of which came against Yorkshire in the 1979 John Player League. In his ten List A matches for Northamptonshire, he scored 44 runs at an average of 8.80, with a high score of 18. With the ball, he took 2 wickets at an average of 76.00, with best figures of 1/22.

He later joined Durham, making his debut for the county in the 1981 Minor Counties Championship, playing a match each against Shropshire. He played Minor counties cricket for Durham in 1981 and 1982, making six appearances. He made a single List A appearance for the county in the 1982 NatWest Trophy against Surrey. In this match, he scored 9 runs before being dismissed by Kevin Mackintosh, with Surrey winning by 111 runs.
