= Willie Parau Browne =

Cook Islands businessman and politician

Member of the Legislative Council

Member of Rarotonga Island Council

Personal details
- Born: 17 February 1884
- Died: 14 November 1957 (aged 73)
- Profession: Businessman

William Parau Browne (17 February 1884 – 14 November 1957) was a Cook Islands businessman and politician. He served as a member of the Legislative Council during the 1950s.

== Biography ==
The son of a European trader, Browne was one of the most prominent businessmen in the Cook Islands. He owned the Royal Hall, which for many year was the only cinema in Rarotonga. Prior to films being screened, he would drive around the island handing out flyers, and would give running commentaries on the films in Māori. He frequently hosted parties at his home in the village of Nikao.

Browne was also involved in politics was elected to Rarotonga Island Council during World War I. He remained a member until 1947. When he was re-elected in 1950, he also became a member of the Legislative Council covering the whole Cook Islands.

Browne was married twice, remarrying after his first wife Tuvaine Tamarua died. He died in November 1957 at the age of 73.
