= James Wentworth Parker =

American engineer and executive

James Wentworth Parker (November 28, 1886 – December 30, 1957) was an American mechanical engineer, president and general manager of the Detroit Edison Company, and 61st president of the American Society of Mechanical Engineers in 1942-1943.

Parker was born in Auburn, New York, to Charles A. Parker and Sara (Cole) Parker. He graduated from Cornell University in 1908, and started his lifelong career at Detroit Edison as apprentice in the boiler design group. He became chief assistant of engineer at the power plants in 1915, vice president in 1917, and chief engineer in 1924, and president and general manager from 1943 until his retirement in 1951. From 1947 to 1951 he chaired the Industrial Advisory Group of the United States Atomic Energy Commission, and assisted in 1949 in Germany to reorganize the German utility system.

Parker was awarded honorary degrees from the New York University Polytechnic School of Engineering, the Rensselaer Polytechnic, the Stevens Institute of Technology, and the Wayne State University.
