= John Burnham (submarine designer) =

American artist (1917 - 1957)

John M. Burnham (September 11, 1917 – November 15, 1957) was the designer of USS Nautilus (SSN-571), the world's first operational nuclear-powered submarine.

He was a 1941 graduate of the United States Naval Academy. In 1947, he joined the Electric Boat Division of the General Dynamics Corporation at Groton, Connecticut. He became design manager at Electric Boat in 1952 and was responsible for the design of Nautilus and two other nuclear-powered submarines, USS Seawolf (SSN-575) and USS Skate (SSN-578).
