= Sanitary engineering =

Application of engineering methods to sanitation of human communities

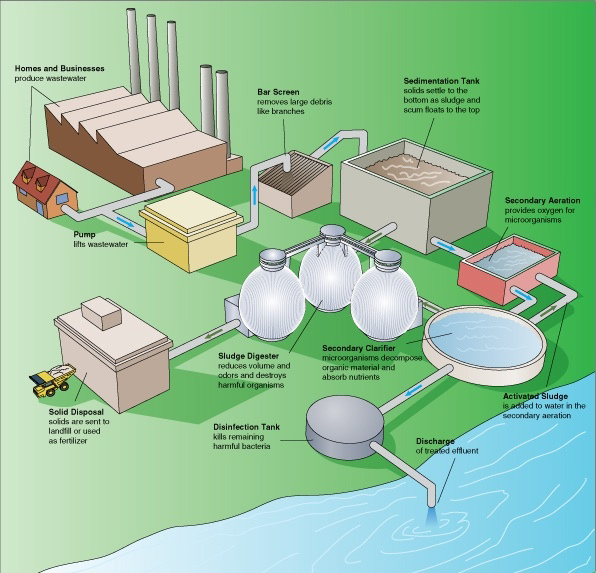
An example of a wastewater treatment system.

Sanitary engineering or sanitation engineering, also known as public health engineering or wastewater engineering, is the application of engineering methods to improve sanitation of human communities, primarily by providing the removal and disposal of human waste, and in addition to the supply of safe potable water. Traditionally a branch of civil engineering and now a subset of building services engineering and environmental engineering, in the mid-19th century, the discipline concentrated on the reduction of disease, then thought to be caused by miasma. This was accomplished mainly by the collection and segregation of sewerage flow in London specifically, and Great Britain generally. These and later regulatory improvements were reported in the United States as early as 1865.

It is also concerned with environmental factors that do not have an immediate and clearly understood effect on public health. Areas outside the purview of sanitary engineering include aesthetic concerns such as landscaping, and environmental conservation as it pertains to plants and animals.

Skills within this field are usually employed for the primary goal of disease prevention within human beings by assuring a supply of healthy drinking water, treatment of waste water, and removal of garbage from inhabited areas.

Compared to (for example) electrical engineering or mechanical engineering which are concerned primarily with closed systems, sanitary engineering is a very interdisciplinary field which may involve such elements as plumbing, fire protection, hydraulics, life safety, constructive modelling, information technology, project design, microbiology, pathology and the many divisions within environmental science and environmental technology. In some cases, considerations that fall within the field of social sciences and urban planning must be factored in as well.

Although sanitary engineering may be most associated with the design of sewers, sewage treatment and wastewater treatment facilities, recycling centers, public landfills and other things which are constructed, the term applies equally to a plan of action to reverse the effects of water pollution or soil contamination in a specific area.

== History ==
Irrigation systems were invented five to seven thousand years ago as a means of supplying water to agriculture-based societies. Aqueducts and irrigation systems were among the first forms of wastewater engineering. As population centers became more dense, they were used to remove sewage from settlements. The Romans were among the first to demonstrate the effectiveness of the aqueduct. The Dark Ages marked a period where progress in water management came to a halt.

As populations grew, the management of human waste became a growing concern and a public health threat. By the 1850s in London, more than 400,000 tons of sewage were flushed into the River Thames each day - around 150 million tons per year. Diseases such as smallpox, diphtheria, measles, scarlet fever, typhus, cholera, and typhoid were spread via the contaminated water supply. During the 19th century, major cities started building sewage systems to remove human waste out of cities and into rivers.

=== Sanitation in the 1900s ===
During the 1900s, the activated sludge process was invented. The activated sludge process is a form of water purification that uses bacteria to consume human feces. Chlorine is used later in the process to kill off the bacteria. In the 1950s, the public health reports provided plans for supplying clean water for the public by first looking at potential hazards. The organization looked carefully at water contamination as well as how drinking water was being treated. They also prioritized finding methods that were effective, yet not too costly. Sanitation cost is the main issue for many foreign (not the United States) countries. The average cost of home water and sanitation systems start at $50 a month, when many citizens don't make enough money to use on non-necessities.

Over the centuries, much has changed in the field of wastewater engineering. Advancements in microbiology, chemistry, and engineering have drastically changed the field. Today, wastewater engineers also work on the collection of clean water for drinking, chemically treating it, and using UV light to kill off micro-organisms. They also treat water pollution in wastewater (blackwater and greywater) so that this water may be made safe for use without endangering the population and environment around it. Wastewater treatment and water reclamation are areas of concern in this field.

==== Harm Huizenga ====
Prior to modern forms of sanitation in neighborhoods and cities, people would simply leave their trash on the street. In 1892, it was such an issue, that a man named Harm Huizenga volunteered to clean up the mess by himself. The Dutch man went around the streets in his wagon, picking up the garbage of the city of Chicago. Little efforts like that were present throughout the early 1900s, until around 1968. Huizenga's grandson, Wayne Huizenga, made his grandfather's idea into a business, Waste Management. By the seventies, waste management as a whole was seen as a necessary practice by the public.

== Sanitation in the United States ==
=== California/Counties ===
In the early 1940s, many counties in the state had problems with their disposal of waste, especially in the Lake Tahoe area. Citizens of these towns feared that their city's poor sewage systems would cause outbreaks in illnesses, like poliomyelitis, cholera, and hepatitis, to name a few. Cholera in particular is the biggest health risk attached to waste management. The illness is caused by bacteria, especially when a person ingests food or water that contain the bacteria. In poorer areas, this is extremely likely due to the cross contamination of waste and drinking water.

==== Counties ====
- El Dorado county has numerous garbage collection facilities, some private companies. In residential areas, the main source of waste is oil. Since then, many waste management facilities have been built in El Dorado county, reducing the risk of these illnesses. Since the fifties, the county has been utilizing the contacts from the companies to provide a low-cost and successful method of keeping the towns clean. Today, there are 7 franchises assigned to the county with different areas of pickup, such as El Dorado Disposal and American River Disposal.
- San Joaquin valley is very recycling focused. The website for the San Joaquin county's waste management shows many tips for how to recycle all recyclable items, in hopes that their county will comply. One of the tips is to verify that all items in the recycling bins are recyclable, because the load might not get recycled at all. The website is very helpful for the public for to help with waste management in residential areas.

== Education ==
=== Engineering ===
Wastewater engineering is not usually its own degree course, but a specialization from degrees such as environmental and sanitary engineering, sanitary engineering, civil engineering, environmental engineering, bio-chemical engineering, or chemical engineering. Formal education for wastewater engineers begins in high school with students taking classes such as chemistry, biology, physics, and higher mathematics including calculus. After high school most jobs require certification from a state agency. Those wanting to advance in the industry should pursue a sanitary engineering, environmental and sanitary engineering, civil engineering, mechanical engineering, environmental engineering, or a facilities engineering degree. Gaining experience through internships and working while in college is a common pathway toward advancement.

Education about waste treatment requires course work in systems design, machinery design principles, water chemistry, and similar coursework. Other classes may include Chemistry of Plant Processes, and various plant operations courses.

Wastewater engineers may advance in their careers through additional education and experience. With additional knowledge and experience one can become the manager of an entire plant. The accreditation body certifying the education for the degree and license is the Accreditation Board for Engineering and Technology (ABET). Over time, some companies may require the wastewater engineer to continue their education to keep up with any changes in technology.

Obtaining one's master's degree is encouraged since many companies list it as a preference in selection.

In this field 76 percent of those employed have a bachelor's degree, 17 percent have a master's degree and three percent have a post-doctoral degree as of 2013. The average annual salary is approximately $83,360.

=== Plant Operations ===
Initial employment in wastewater engineering can be obtained by those with and without advanced formal education. The California State Water Resources Control Board (SWRCB), for example, shows how individuals can advance through a progression of certifications as Waste Water Treatment Operators. The Board uses a five level classification system to classify water treatment facilities into categories I-V according to the population served and the complexity of the treatment system.

The Operator Certification requirements for water treatment operators and waste water treatment operators are described in detail by State law. To meet certification requirements, operators must submit an application to SWRCB, have the necessary work experience, meet the educational requirements, and pass an examination based on the knowledge, skill, and abilities described in the regulations. Operators are required to renew their certificates every three years. To be eligible for renewal, certified operators must complete a specified number of continuing education hours after the previous issuance of a certificate.

== Job description and typical tasks ==
Important job types working in sanitary engineering include sanitation workers, waste collectors and wastewater engineers.

Wastewater engineers use a variety of skills and must have knowledge of mechanical and environmental engineering. They are required to perform tasks and demonstrate knowledge in design, mathematics, English, construction, physics, chemistry, biology, management, and personnel. Wastewater engineers must have skills in complex problem solving, critical thinking, mathematics, active listening, judgement, reading comprehension, speaking, writing, science, and system analysis. Typical work activities include problem solving, communication with management and staff, gathering information, analyzing data, evaluating standards and complying with them, and communicating with others in the field.

Wastewater engineers perform these activities by combining their knowledge and skills to perform tasks. These tasks are to understand computer-aided design programs, and to conduct studies for the construction of facilities, water supply systems and collection systems. They may design systems for wastewater collection machinery, as well as system components. They may perform water flow analysis, then select designs and equipment based on government and industry standards. Some are involved with a specific area of concern such as waste collection or the maintenance of waste water facilities and stormwater drainage systems within an area. Others cover a broader scope of activities that might include maintenance of the public water supply, collection of residential yard waste program, disposal of hazardous waste, recycling strategies and even community programs where individuals or businesses "adopt" an area and either maintain it themselves or donate funds for doing so.

Wastewater engineers may also map out topographical and geographical features of Earth to determine the best means of collection, design pipe and pumped collection systems, and design treatment processes for collected wastewater.

=== Typical employers ===
Wastewater engineers work for private companies, state and local governments, and special districts.

== Modern challenges ==
=== Water scarcity ===
Water managers confront new challenges and the need for new technology as water levels decrease due to increasingly frequent and extended droughts. Technologies such as sonar mapping are being used in wells to determine the volume of water that they can hold. For example, the United States Geological Survey and the State of New York worked together to map underground aquifers since the 1980s. Today they have thorough maps of these aquifers to assist in water management.

Desalination plants may be required in the future for those regions hardest hit by water scarcity. Desalination is a process of cleaning water by means of evaporation. Water is evaporated and it passes through membranes. The water is then cooled and condenses allowing it to flow either back into the main water line or out to sea.

=== Smart Sanitation ===
Smart Sanitation: Advances in sensor technology, data analytics, and automation are enabling the development of smart sanitation systems that can monitor water quality, detect leaks, optimize treatment processes, and improve overall efficiency. Sanitary engineers need to leverage these technologies to enhance the performance and reliability of sanitation infrastructure.

=== Climate change ===
Wastewater treatment contributes to global warming in many ways. One of the factors that contributes to global warming is wastewater treatment facilities and their emissions of greenhouse gases. Some of those gases are carbon dioxide, methane, and nitrous oxide. These gases occur because of the decomposition of organic material from the anaerobic bacteria. These bacteria clean the leftover waste. Even if the anaerobic bacteria decomposition produces these gases, the percentage of greenhouse gases that other equipment produce is still greater than the contribution of the anaerobic bacteria. Also, the power usage from those machinery is very high. That is why many facilities are undergoing renovation to use higher levels of anaerobic bacteria compared to other types of equipment.

Impacts of climate change on sanitary engineering vary based on region and the sanitation solutions employed there. In the Arctic, permafrost melting has caused damage to pipes and other infrastructure. In the Northeastern United States, increased precipitation has overwhelmed aging infrastructure not equipped to handle the massive volume of water from heavy precipitation. In the Western United States, prolonged drought has decreased water availability. This has led some wastewater facilities to expand recycled and reclaimed water programs. Climate change has also affected water distribution pipes. Physical stress from climate change-related conditions such as extreme rainfall or drought increases the rate of pipe corrosion, adding to facility cost.
