= List of University of Chicago alumni =

This list of University of Chicago alumni consists of notable people who graduated or attended the University of Chicago. The alumni of the university include graduates and attendees. Graduates are defined as those who hold bachelor's, master's, or Ph.D. degrees from the university, while attendees are those who studied at the university but did not complete the program or obtain a degree. Honorary degree holders and auditors of the university are excluded. Summer session attendees are also excluded from the list since summer terms are not part of the university's formal academic years.

== Academia ==
=== Presidents ===
- Eric Ashby, Baron Ashby – former master of Clare College, Cambridge and Vice-Chancellor of University of Cambridge
- Richard C. Atkinson (Ph.B. 1948) – president of the University of California (1995–2003)
- Marguerite Ross Barnett (A.M. 1966, Ph.D. 1972) – first African-American and female president of the University of Houston (1990–92); first African-American chancellor of the University of Missouri (1986–90)
- M. Craig Barnes (Ph.D. 1992) – president of Princeton Theological Seminary
- Werner A. Baum (Ph.D.) – second chancellor of University of Wisconsin–Milwaukee (1973–1979) and the 7th president of University of Rhode Island (1968–1973)
- Aaron Ben-Ze'ev (born 1949) –president of the University of Haifa
- Henry Bienen (A.M. 1962, Ph.D. 1966) – president of Northwestern University (1995–2009)
- George W. Bond (M.A. 1923) – president of Louisiana Tech University, 1928–1936
- Leon Botstein (A.B. 1967) – president of Bard College (1975–2026); principal conductor of American Symphony Orchestra
- Frances R. Brown (M.A. English) – president of Chevy Chase Junior College and dean of Radcliffe College
- Albert Chan (Ph.D. 1979) – president of Hong Kong Baptist University
- King Virgil Cheek (J.D. 1969) – president of Shaw University (1969–1971); president of Morgan State University (1971–1974)
- Rebecca S. Chopp (Ph.D. 1983) – former chancellor, University of Denver; former president of Swarthmore College; president of Colgate University (2002–2009); former dean of Yale Divinity School; former provost of Emory University; feminist theologian
- John Royston Coleman (Ph.D. 1950) –president of Haverford College; former dean of Carnegie-Mellon University; host of CBS program Money Talks
- Jesse Lee Cuninggim – President of Scarritt College for Christian Workers, head of the Department of Religious Education at Southern Methodist University
- Peter Dorman (Ph.D. 1985) – president, American University of Beirut (2008–present)
- Christopher L. Eisgruber (J.D. 1988) – 20th president of Princeton University
- Paul Finkelman (Ph.D. 1976) – president of Gratz College (2017–present)
- Edgar Godbold (Ph.D. 1907) – president of Howard Payne University in Brownwood, Texas (1923–1929), and Louisiana College in Pineville, Louisiana (1942–1951)
- Marvin L. Goldberger (Ph.D. 1948) – president of California Institute of Technology (1978–1987)
- Clifton Daggett Gray (Ph.D.) – president of Bates College (1920–1944)
- Susan Henking (Ph.D. 1988) – president of Shimer College (2012–present)
- Leo I. Higdon Jr. (M.B.A. 1972) – president of Connecticut College, the College of Charleston, and Babson College
- William E. Holmes – former president of Central City College; faculty of the Atlanta Baptist Institute, now called Morehouse College, for 25 years
- Howard Wesley Johnson (A.M. 1947) – president of Massachusetts Institute of Technology (1966–1971)
- Robert Kibbee (masters 1947, doctorate 1957) – chancellor of the City University of New York
- Thomas W. Krise (Ph.D. 1995) – 13th president of Pacific Lutheran University (2012–2017)
- Benjamin E. Mays (A.M. 1925, Ph.D. 1935) – president of Morehouse College (1940–1967)
- William Parker McKee (B.Div., 1887) – second president of Shimer College
- Jacob (Kobi) Metzer – eighth president of the Open University of Israel, economic historian, and professor
- Dallin H. Oaks (J.D. 1957) – former president of Brigham Young University
- Edison E. Oberholtzer (A.M. 1915) – founder and first president of the University of Houston
- G. Dennis O'Brien (Ph.D., 1961) – former president of Bucknell University and the University of Rochester
- Leo J. O'Donovan (postdoctoral fellow at University of Chicago) – 47th president of Georgetown University
- Santa J. Ono (A.B. 1984) – 15th president of University of Michigan; 15th president and Vice-Chancellor of University of British Columbia; 28th president of University of Cincinnati
- Don Patinkin (1922–1995)) – president of the Hebrew University of Jerusalem
- William L. Pollard (Ph.D. 1976) – president of Medgar Evers College
- Clayton Rose (B.A. 1980, M.B.A. 1981) – president of Bowdoin College
- Thomas Sakmar (A.B. Chemistry 1978, M.D. Medicine 1982) – professor and former acting president of The Rockefeller University
- Vivian Blanche Small (M.A. 1905) – president, Lake Erie College
- Barbara Snyder (J.D.) – president of Case Western Reserve University
- Gerhard Spiegler – former president of Elizabethtown College
- Samuel L. Stanley (A.B. 1976) – president of Stony Brook University (2009–2019) and Michigan State University
- Teresa A. Sullivan (Ph.D.) – sociologist and university administrator, 8th president of the University of Virginia
- David Truman (A.M. 1936, Ph.D. 1939) – president of Mount Holyoke College (1969–1978); president of Russell Sage Foundation (1978–1979)
- Sidney David Williams – president of Elizabeth City State Teachers College
- Richard R. Wright Jr. – sociologist; president of Wilberforce University

=== Provosts and vice chancellors ===
- Pabitra Sarkar (A.M., Ph.D) – Indian Bengali linguist, writer and academician; vice chancellor of Rabindra Bharati University

=== Deans ===
- Sophonisba Breckinridge (JD, 1904) – dean of the College of Arts, Literature, and Science, University of Chicago
- John W. Boyer (A.M. 1969, Ph.D. 1975) – dean of the college at the University of Chicago
- Tom Campbell (A.B. 1973, A.M. 1973, Ph.D. 1980) – dean of Haas School of Business at the University of California, Berkeley
- Margaret S. Collins (Ph.D. 1950) – invertebrate zoologist, professor and dean of the zoology department at Florida A&M University
- Ward Farnsworth (J.D. 1994) – dean of University of Texas School of Law
- Eliza Atkins Gleason (Ph.D. 1940) – founding dean of the Atlanta University School of Library Service; first African-American to earn a Ph.D in Library Science
- David Aaron Kessler (J.D. 1978) – dean of the University of California at San Francisco School of Medicine; former dean of Yale School of Medicine; former Food and Drug Administration Commissioner
- Ovid R. Sellers (A.B. 1904) – Professor of the Old Testament and Dean of McCormick Theological Seminary in Chicago, Illinois

=== Professors ===
- Janet L. Abu-Lughod (A.B. 1947, A.M. 1950) – professor emerita of Sociology at the New School for Social Research
- Guillermo Algaze (A.M. 1979, Ph.D. 1986) – MacArthur Fellow (2003); professor of Anthropology at the University of California, San Diego
- Anne Allison (A.M. 1979, Ph.D. 1986) – Robert O. Keohane Professor of Cultural Anthropology, Duke University
- John Alroy (Ph.D. 1994) – paleobiologist and researcher at the National Center for Ecological Analysis and Synthesis, UCSB, 2007 Charles Schuchert Award from the Paleontological Society
- Alfred C. Aman Jr. (J.D. 1970) – professor of administrative law; author; dean of Indiana University Maurer School of Law – Bloomington and Suffolk University Law School
- Elijah Anderson (A.M. 1972) – William K. Lanman Jr. Professor of Sociology, Yale University
- Arjun Appadurai (A.M. 1973, Ph.D. 1976) – Goddard Professor of Media, Culture, and Communication, New York University
- Solange Ashby (PhD 2016) – assistant professor in the Department of Near Eastern Languages and Cultures at the University of California, Los Angeles
- Robert Axelrod (A.B. 1964) – MacArthur Fellow (1990); professor of Public Policy, University of Michigan
- Asish Basu (M.Sc. 1969) – professor emeritus of Earth and Environmental Sciences at the University of Texas at Arlington
- Howard S. Becker (Ph.B. 1946, A.M. 1949, Ph.D. 1951) – former professor of Sociology at Northwestern University and the University of California, Santa Barbara
- Walter Berns (A.M. 1951, Ph.D. 1953) – John M. Olin University Professor Emeritus at Georgetown University
- Richard J. Bernstein (A.B.) – philosopher, professor of philosophy at the New School for Social Research
- George Ricker Berry (Ph.D. 1895) – Semitic scholar, author, archaeologist, and Professor Emeritus of Colgate-Rochester Divinity School
- Nigel Biggar (A.M. 1980, Ph.D. 1986) – Regius Professor of Moral and Pastoral Theology at the University of Oxford
- Leonard Bloomfield –professor, linguist who led the development of structural linguistics
- Larry Bourne (Ph.D. 1966) – professor emeritus of Urban Geography and Planning, University of Toronto
- Michael Burawoy (Ph.D. 1976) – professor of Sociology, University of California, Berkeley
- J. Peter Burkholder (Ph.D. 1983) – Distinguished Professor Emeritus of Musicology, Indiana University Jacobs School of Music
- Antoinette Burton (A.M. 1984, Ph.D. 1990) – Catherine A. and Bruce C. Bastian Professor of Global and Transnational Studies and Professor of History at the University of Illinois at Urbana-Champaign
- Lynton K. Caldwell (A.B. 1934, Ph.D. 1943) – Arthur F. Bentley Professor Emeritus of Political Science at Indiana University Bloomington
- Stephen Cameron (Ph.D. 1996) – financial analyst, economist and Adjunct Associate Professor of International and Public Affairs at Columbia University
- Donald Eric Capps (M.A. 1966, Ph.D. 1970) – scholar and Professor of Pastoral Theology
- Jane C. Charlton (M.S. 1984) – professor of astronomy and astrophysics
- Marvin Chirelstein (J.D. 1953) – professor at Columbia Law School and Yale Law School
- Gregory Chow (A.M. 1952, Ph.D. 1955) – professor of Economics, Emeritus, and Class of 1913 Professor of Political Economy, Emeritus, at Princeton University
- Henry Steele Commager (Ph.B. 1923, A.M. 1924, Ph.D. 1928) – historian at New York University, Columbia University, and at Amherst College
- May Louise Cowles – economist; researcher, member of the faculty at the University of Wisconsin–Madison
- Avery Craven (Ph.D. 1923) – professor of History; Civil War expert
- Herrlee G. Creel (Ph.B. 1926, A.M. 1927, Ph.D. 1929) – professor of Chinese at the University of Chicago
- Mihály Csíkszentmihályi (A.B. 1960, Ph.D. 1965) – C.S. and D.J. Davidson Professor of Psychology and Management, Claremont Graduate University; pioneer of the concept of "flow"
- James Dahlberg (Ph.D. 1966) – professor emeritus of biomolecular chemistry, University of Wisconsin–Madison
- Werner J. Dannhauser (Ph.D. 1971) – professor of Government at Cornell University and Michigan State University, expert on Nietzsche and on Judaism and politics
- Nicholas de Genova (A.B. 1982, Ph.D. 1989) – Assistant Professor of Anthropology, Columbia University
- Stefanie DeLuca (A.B. 1998) – professor of Sociology at Johns Hopkins University; author of Coming of Age in the Other America
- Savas Dimopoulos (Ph.D. 1978) – theoretical physicist at Stanford; with Howard Georgi, he formulated the supersymmetric extension to the Standard Model, the leading theory for particle physics beyond the Standard Model
- Nicholas Dirks (A.M. 1974, Ph.D. 1981) – Franz Boas Professor of History and Anthropology; vice-president for Arts and Sciences at Columbia University
- Herman Dreer (Ph.D. 1955) – professor at Stowe Teachers College (now Harris–Stowe State University) and MacMurray College
- Kristina Durante – chaired professor at Rutgers Business School – Newark and New Brunswick
- Eleftherios Economou (Ph.D. 1969) – theoretical physicist at Univ. of Crete, Greece; known for his contributions in the field of surface plasmons; founder and chairman of the Foundation for Research & Technology - Hellas (1983–2004)
- Paul Ekman – professor emeritus at the University of California, San Francisco, pioneer in the study of emotions and their relation to facial expressions
- Norman Ericson (Ph.D.) – Bible scholar, faculty at Trinity International University
- Eve Ewing (BA) – sociologist, author, poet, and visual artist; associate professor at the University of Chicago
- Eugene Fama (Ph.D. 1964) – father of efficient market theory. Robert R. McCormick Distinguished Service Professor of Finance at the University of Chicago
- Marianne Ferber (Ph.D.) – professor emeritus of Economics at University of Illinois at Urbana-Champaign
- Paul Finkelman (M.A. 1972, Ph.D. 1976) – President William McKinley Distinguished Professor of Law Emeritus, Albany Law School and president of Gratz College; legal historian and author of Supreme Injustice: Slavery in the Nation's Highest Court (2018)
- James L. Fitzgerald (B.A. 1971, M.A. 1974, Ph.D. 1980) – Purandara Das Distinguished Professor of Sanskrit in the Department of Classics, Brown University
- George P. Fletcher (J.D. 1964) – professor at Columbia Law School
- Lawrence M. Friedman (A.B. 1948, J.D. 1951, LL.M. 1953) – Marion Rice Kirkwood Professor of Law at Stanford Law School; legal historian and author of Crime and Punishment in American History
- David Fromkin (A.B. 1950, J.D. 1953) – University Professor of International Relations, History, and Law at Boston University
- Roland G. Fryer Jr. – Henry Lee Professor of Economics at Harvard University
- Gerald Gabrielse (Ph.D. 1980) – professor of Physics at Harvard, known for his techniques of creating antimatter
- Marc Galanter (J.D.) – professor emeritus at University of Wisconsin School of Law
- Alexander L. George (A.M. 1941, Ph.D. 1958) – MacArthur Fellow (1983); Graham H. Stuart Professor of International Relations, Emeritus, Stanford University; pioneering scholar in political psychology and foreign policy
- Michael Gerhardt (J.D. 1982) – constitutional law professor at UNC School of Law; Special Counsel to the Senate Judiciary Committee for the nominations of Sonia Sotomayor (2009), Elena Kagan (2010), and Neil Gorsuch (2017) to the U.S. Supreme Court
- Zvi Griliches (A.M. 1955, Ph.D. 1957) – John Bates Clark medalist (1965); economist at Harvard University
- Benjamin Ginsberg (B.A. 1968, A.M. 1970, Ph.D. 1973) – professor of political science at Johns Hopkins University
- Erving Goffman (A.M. 1949, Ph.D. 1953) – former professor of Sociology at the University of California, Berkeley and the University of Pennsylvania
- Jonathan Gold (Ph.D. 2003) – D. T. Suzuki Professor in Buddhist Studies at Princeton University
- Claudia Goldin (Ph.D. 1972) – winner of the 2023 Nobel Memorial Prize in Economics, Henry Lee Professor of Economics at Harvard University
- Anthony Grafton (A.B. 1971, A.M. 1972, Ph.D. 1975) – prominent Renaissance historian and Henry Putnam University Professor at Princeton University
- Sanford J. Grossman (A.B. 1973, A.M. 1974, Ph.D. 1975) – John Bates Clark medalist (1987); professor and economist
- Daniel S. Hamermesh (B.A. 1965) – professor emeritus of Economics at the University of Texas at Austin
- Charles V. Hamilton (A.M. 1957, Ph.D. 1964) – civil rights leader and Professor in Political Science, Columbia University
- Robin Hanson (A.M. 1984, M.S. 1984) – associate professor of economics at George Mason University, research associate at the Future of Humanity Institute of Oxford University
- W. G. Hardy (Ph.D. 1922) – professor of Classics of University of Alberta
- Edward C. Hayes (Ph.D. 1902) – professor of the American Sociological Association
- Susanna Hecht (A.B. 1972) – professor of Urban Planning, UCLA; a founder of "Political Ecology" approach to forestry; Guggenheim Fellow (2008)
- Carolyn Heinrich (Ph.D. 1995) – Sid Richardson Professor and economist at University of Texas at Austin
- Charles Richmond Henderson (Old University A.B. 1870) – assistant professor of sociology at the University of Chicago
- Gertrude Himmelfarb (Ph.D. 1950) – National Humanities Medal (2004); Professor Emeritus of History at the City University of New York
- Marie Agnes Hinrichs (Ph.D. 1923) – professor at the Southern Illinois University and University of Illinois.
- Brian M. Hoffman (S.B. 1962) – bioinorganic chemist at Northwestern University
- Ukshin Hoti (1943–1999?) – professor of international law at the University of Pristina
- Michael Hudson (born 1939) – economics professor
- Marian E. Hubbard (S.B. 1894) – zoology professor at Wellesley College
- Samuel P. Huntington (A.M. 1948) – Albert J. Weatherhead Professor of Government at Harvard University; author of The Clash of Civilizations (1998)
- Harold Innis – professor of political economy at the University of Toronto
- Kenneth T. Jackson (A.M. 1963, Ph.D. 1966) – Jacques Barzun Professor of History and the Social Sciences at Columbia University
- Russell Jacoby (S.M. 1978) – professor in residence at Department of History, University of California, Los Angeles; author of The Last Intellectuals (1987 [2000])
- Sheila Miyoshi Jager (PhD 1994) – professor of East Asian Studies at Oberlin College
- KC Johnson (M.A. 1989) – professor of History at Brooklyn College and the City University of New York, known for his work exposing the facts about the Duke lacrosse case
- Jeffrey Kaplan (Ph.D. 1993) – associate professor of Religion at the University of Wisconsin–Oshkosh
- Robert Kates (A.M. 1960, Ph.D. 1962) – MacArthur Fellow (1981); Professor Emeritus of Geography and Director Emeritus of the World Hunger Program at Brown University
- Vytautas Kavolis – department head and Professor of Comparative Civilizations and Professor of Sociology at Dickinson College
- William Tinsley Keeton (B.A. 1952, B.S. 1954) – zoologist known for work in animal navigation; professor at Cornell University
- Annie Kennedy – first member of the faculty elected at the Alabama Girls' Industrial School (now, University of Montevallo)
- V. O. Key Jr. (Ph.D. 1934) – taught at UCLA, professor at Johns Hopkins University, Alfred Cowles Professor of Government at Yale University, Jonathan Trumbull Professor of American History and Government at Harvard University
- Bruce M. King (Ph.D. 1978) – psychologist and professor at Clemson University
- Keiichiro Kobayashi (Ph.D. 1998) – professor of Faculty of Economics, Keio University
- John Komlos (Ph.D. 1978) – professor emeritus, LMU Munich economic historian and founder of the journal Economics and Human Biology
- Douglas Laycock (J.D.) – professor at the University of Virginia School of Law, expert of religious liberties
- Judith Walzer Leavitt (Ph.D. 1966) – professor Eemerita, History of Medicine Department, University of Wisconsin, Madison, author of Typhoid Mary
- Rose Hum Lee (Ph.D. 1947) – first woman and first Chinese American to head a US university sociology department, appointed such at Roosevelt University, 1956
- Charles Miller Leslie – professor and anthropologist
- H. Gregg Lewis (A.B. 1936, Ph.D. 1947) – professor and labor economist
- Mark Edward Lewis (A.B. 1977, A.M. 1979, Ph.D. 1985) – Kwoh-Ting Li Professor in Chinese Culture, Department of History, Stanford University
- Julie Beth Lovins (Ph.D. 1973) – linguist-at-large at a University of Tokyo language research institute
- Muhsin Mahdi (A.M., Ph.D.) – Iraqi-American islamologist and Arabist, James Richard Jewett Professor of Arabic at Harvard University
- Guy A. Marco (M.A. 1952, Ph.D. 1956) – musicologist, professor, and librarian
- Lynn Margulis (A.B. 1957) – distinguished professor at the University of Massachusetts Amherst; National Medal of Science 1999 for Endosymbiotic Hypothesis; developed Gaia theory with James Lovelock
- George Willard Martin – mycologist and professor at the University of Iowa
- Antonio Martino (Ph.D. 1968) – professor of Economics at LUISS Guido Carli University in Rome, former Italian Ministry of Defense
- Adeline Masquelier (Ph.D. 1993) – cultural anthropologist at Tulane University
- Kirtley F. Mather (Ph.D. 1915) – professor of Geology at Harvard University; president, American Association for the Advancement of Science; civil libertarian
- Ingrid Mattson (Ph.D. 1999) – professor of religion at Hartford Seminary
- Nolan McCarty (A.B. 1990) – Susan Dod Brown Professor of Politics and Public Affairs at Princeton University
- Walter A. McDougall (A.M. 1971, Ph.D. 1974) – professor of History and Alloy-Ansin Professor of International Relations, University of Pennsylvania; Pulitzer Prize Winner (1986)
- William Hardy McNeill (A.B. 1938, A.M. 1939) – professor emeritus of History at the University of Chicago; author of The Rise of the West: A History of the Human Community (1963)
- Zoila S. Mendoza (M.A. 1987, PhD 1993) – professor and chair of Native American Studies, University of California, Davis
- Thomas W. Merrill (J.D. 1977) – Charles Evans Hughes professor at Columbia Law School
- Clara Worst Miller (1876–1970) (M.A.) – Ashland College professor of Latin and writer
- Richard Thacker Morris (Ph.D.) – professor of Sociology at the University of Chicago and the UCLA
- Kevin M. Murphy (Ph.D. 1986) – John Bates Clark medalist (1997); George J. Stigler Professor of Economics, University of Chicago
- John V. Murra (A.M. 1942, Ph.D. 1956) – professor of anthropology and a researcher of the Inca Empire
- Marc Leon Nerlove (A.B. 1952) – distinguished university professor emeritus in agricultural and resource economics at the University of Maryland John Bates Clark medalist (1969)
- Esther Newton (A.M. 1964, Ph.D. 1968) – Kempner Distinguished Research Professor of Anthropology at SUNY; pioneer in gender and sexuality studies; author of Mother Camp
- Harold L. Nieburg (Ph.B. 1947, A.M. 1952, Ph.D. 1960) – professor of Political Science at SUNY; author of In the Name of Science
- Herman Clarence Nixon – professor, member of the Southern Agrarians
- Anne Norton (A.B. 1977, A.M. 1979, Ph.D. 1982) – Alfred L. Cass Term Chair and Professor of Political Science, University of Pennsylvania; author of Leo Strauss and the Politics of American Empire (2004)
- David Novak (A.B. 1961) – Jewish legal theorist at the University of Toronto; a founder of the Institute of Traditional Judaism; author of Covenantal Rights
- Daniel Nugent (Ph.D. 1988) – professor of Anthropology, University of Arizona
- Walter Oi (Ph.D. 1961) – Elmer B. Milliman Professor of Economics at the University of Rochester
- Sherry Ortner (A.M. 1966, Ph.D. 1970) – MacArthur Fellow (1990); Distinguished Professor of Anthropology, University of California, Los Angeles
- Saundra Herndon Oyewole (M.S.) – microbiologist, professor at Trinity Washington University, and Program Director of Undergraduate Education at the National Science Foundation
- Saul K. Padover (Ph.D. 1932) – historian and political scientist at the New School for Social Research in New York City
- William Padula (M.Sc. 2015) – professor of Pharmaceutical & Health Economics, University of Southern California
- Vivian Paley (Ph.B. 1947) – resarcher and teacher at the University of Chicago Laboratory Schools
- Richard Anthony Parker (Ph.D. 1938) – Charles Edwin Wilbour Professor of Egyptology at Brown University; director of the University of Chicago's epigraphic survey studying the mortuary temple of Ramses III
- Jaroslav Pelikan (Ph.D. 1946) – historian of Christian thought; Sterling Professor of History at Yale University; winner of Library of Congress' Kluge Prize in the Human Sciences; author of The Christian Tradition: A History of the Development of Doctrine
- Tom Philpott (Ph.D.) – professor of history at the University of Texas, researcher into child prostitution
- Vijay Prashad (A.M. 1990, Ph.D. 1994) – George and Martha Kellner Chair in South Asian History and Professor of International Studies, Trinity College; author of The Darker Nations: A People's History of the Third World (2007)
- George L. Priest (J.D.) – John M. Olin Professor of Law and Economics and director of the John M. Olin Center for Law, Economics, and Public Policy at Yale Law School
- Enrico Quarantelli (Ph.D. 1959) – professor of sociology at the Ohio State University; founder of disaster science
- Paul Rabinow (A.B. 1965, A.M. 1967, Ph.D. 1970) – Robert H. Lowie Distinguished Chair in Anthropology, University of California, Berkeley
- Renee Rabinowitz (A.M. 1969, Ph.D. 1974) – taught psychology at Indiana University, and later served as in-house legal counsel at Colorado College
- Jonathan Rapping (A.B.) – professor of law at Atlanta's John Marshall Law School and Harvard Law School, criminal defense attorney, founder and president of Gideon's Promise, MacArthur Fellow (2014)
- Nicolas Rasmussen (A.M. 1986) – professor of History at the University of New South Wales
- James M. Redfield (A.B. 1954, Ph.D. 1961) – Edward Olson Distinguished Service Professor and Professor of the Committee on Social Thought at the University of Chicago (1976–present)
- Albert Rees (Ph.D. 1950) – former University of Chicago and Princeton economics professor, Provost at Princeton, advisor to President Gerald Ford
- Harriet Lange Rheingold (Ph.D. 1955) – developmental psychologist and professor at University of North Carolina at Chapel Hill
- Philip Rieff (A.B. 1946, A.M. 1947, Ph.D. 1954) – Benjamin Franklin Professor of Sociology at the University of Pennsylvania; author of Freud: The Mind of the Moralist (1959); sociologist
- Mario J. Rizzo (Ph.D. 1977) – professor of economics at New York University
- Francesca Rochberg (Ph.D. 1980) – Catherine and William L. Magistretti Distinguished Professor of Near Eastern Studies, University of California, Berkeley; MacArthur Fellow (1982)
- Raymond R. Rogers (Ph.D. 1995) – geology professor
- Richard Rorty (A.B. 1949, A.M. 1952) – professor of Philosophy and Comparative Literature at Stanford University; MacArthur Fellow
- Lawrence Rosen (Ph.D. 1968, J.D. 1974) – William Nelson Cromwell Professor of Anthropology at Princeton University; Adjunct Professor of Law at Columbia University
- Arthur H. Rosenfeld (Ph.D. 1954) – physicist; professor at University of California, Berkeley; energy efficiency pioneer
- Joel T. Rosenthal (PhD 1963) – Distinguished Professor and Emeritus at SUNY
- Philip Carl Salzman (Ph.D. 1972) – professor of Anthropology, McGill University
- Paul Samuelson (A.B. 1935) – institute professor, MIT; Bank of Sweden Prize in Economics in Memory of Alfred Nobel, 1970
- Ritch Savin-Williams (A.M. 1973, Ph.D. 1977) – professor of developmental psychology at Cornell University; prolific sexual orientation researcher
- Thomas Sebeok (A.B. 1941, A.M. 1943) – professor at t Indiana University in Bloomington; semiotician and linguist
- Richard Sennett (A.B. 1964) – Centennial Professor of Sociology at the London School of Economics, Bemis Adjunct Professor of Sociology at MIT, and Professor of Humanities at New York University
- Kong, Shenzhen, former chair of the Department of Political Science at the University of Iowa and head of the Division of Social Science at the Hong Kong University of Science and Technology
- Gertrude Smith (BA 1916, MA 1917, PhD 1921) – Edwin Olson Professor of Greek (1933–1961) and chair of the Department of Classics (1934–1961)
- Eileen Southern (A.B. 1940, A.M. 1941) – National Humanities Medal (2001); first African-American female professor at Harvard University
- Thomas Sowell (Ph.D. 1968) – winner of the National Humanities Medal (2003); economist and senior fellow at Hoover Institution, Stanford University
- Orin Starn (A.B. 1982) – Sally Dalton Robinson Professor of Cultural Anthropology, Duke University
- Daniel Stokols (A.B. 1969) – Chancellor's Professor Emeritus of Social Ecology, University of California, Irvine
- Alan Stone (M.S., Ph.D.) – distinguished professor of political science at the University of Houston
- Verner E. Suomi (Ph.D. 1953) – educator, inventor, and scientist and professor at the University of Wisconsin–Madison; considered the father of satellite meteorology
- Edwin Sutherland (Ph.D. 1913) – former professor of sociology at Indiana University
- Wenfang Tang (Ph.D. 1990) – Presidential Chair Professor and the dean of the School of Humanities and Social Science at the Chinese University of Hong
- David Tannor (born 1958) – theoretical chemist, Hermann Mayer Professorial Chair in the Department of Chemical Physics at the Weizmann Institute of Science
- Shiro Tashiro (B.S. 1909, Ph.D. 1912) – Japanese-American biochemist and professor
- Robert Thompson (A.B. 1981) – director of Syracuse University's Center for the Study of Popular Television
- Richard H. Timberlake (Ph.D. 1957) – Professor of Economics at the University of Georgia
- Vince Tinto – Distinguished University Professor of sociology at Syracuse University's School of Education
- Reeta Chowdhari Tremblay (Ph.D. 1990) – professor of political science and former provost, University of Victoria
- Jeffrey K. Tulis (Ph.D. 1982) – professor of Government and Law, The University of Texas at Austin
- Sherry Turkle (attended Committee on Social Thought, 1971) – Abby Rockefeller Mauze Professor of the Social Studies of Science and Technology at Massachusetts Institute of Technology
- Jonathan Turley (A.B. 1983) – professor of law at The George Washington University Law School
- Sudhir Venkatesh (A.M. 1992, Ph.D. 1997) – William B. Ransford Professor of Sociology, Columbia University
- Loïc Wacquant (A.M. 1986, Ph.D. 1994) – MacArthur Fellow (1997); Professor of Sociology, University of California, Berkeley
- David H. Waldeck (Ph.D. 1983) – chemist, distinguished professor at the University of Pittsburgh
- John M. Wallace Jr. (A.M. 1987) – professor of Sociology, University of Pittsburgh
- Chi Che Wang (M.S. 1916, Ph.D. 1918) – biochemist, professor at Northwestern University and University of Cincinnati
- Gerald J. Wasserburg (B.S. 1951, M.S. 1952, Ph.D. 1954) – John D. MacArthur Professor of Geology and Geophysics, Emeritus at California Institute of Technology
- Richard Wassersug (Ph.D. 1973) – professor of anatomy at Dalhousie University
- Gerhard Weinberg (A.M. 1949, Ph.D. 1951) – historian, World War II expert; William R. Kenan Jr. Professor Emeritus of History, University of North Carolina, Chapel Hill
- James Q. Wilson (A.M. 1957, Ph.D. 1959) – Ronald Reagan Professor of Public Policy at Pepperdine University; Presidential Medal of Freedom recipient (2003)
- Erik Winfree (B.S.) – computer scientist, bioengineer, and professor at California Institute of Technology; MacArthur fellow in 2000
- Irene J. Winter (M.A. 1967) – Ancient Near East Art historian, professor at Harvard and chair of the department of Fine Arts from 1993 to 1996; MacArthur Fellow (1983), Radcliffe Fellow (2003–04), Mellon Lecturer (2005)
- Henry Tutwiler Wright (A.M. 1965, Ph.D. 1967) – MacArthur Fellow (1983); Professor of Anthropology and Curator of Archaeology, University of Michigan
- Theodore O. Yntema (Ph.D. 1929) – economist, director of the Cowles Commission; professor at the University of Chicago

=== Other ===
- Laird Bell (J.D.) – lawyer, chairman of the Chicago Council on Foreign Relations
- Laurin L. Henry – researcher at the Brookings Institution
- William Niskanen (A.M. 1955, Ph.D. 1962) – chairman of the Cato Institute in Washington, D.C.
- Mildred Mott Wedel (M.A. 1938) – scholar of Great Plains archaeology and ethnohistory

== Activism and social reform ==
- Saul Alinsky (Ph.B. 1930) – labor organizer and political activist
- Allan Berube (X. 1968) – founder of the San Francisco Gay and Lesbian History Project, now the Gay and Lesbian Historical Society; author of Coming Out Under Fire (1990) [Lambda Literary Award]; MacArthur Fellow (1996)
- Jo Freeman (Ph.D. 1972) – feminist
- Vernon Johns – civil rights activist, pastor of Dexter Avenue Baptist Church
- Frances Kellor – social reformer and sociologist, specializing in immigrants' rights
- Vivian Carter Mason (A.B. 1925) – gender and civil rights advocate
- Richard B. Spencer (A.M. 2003) – white supremacist, alt-right leader
- Carter G. Woodson (A.B. 1908, A.M. 1908) – founder of Negro History Week (1926), which evolved into Black History Month; civil rights activist

== Art ==
- Jessica Abel (A.B. 1991) – comic book artist
- Lester Beall (A.B. 1926) – modernist graphic designer
- JoAnne Carson – painter and sculptor, Guggenheim Fellow (2016)
- Alyce Frank (1950) – artist
- Leon Golub (A.B. 1942) – artist
- Wolf Kahn (A.B. 1950) – artist
- Peter Marzio – former director of Museum of Fine Arts, Houston
- Amy Meyers (A.B. 1977) – art historian and museum director
- Dan Peterman – artist

== Business ==
- Andrew Alper (A.B. 1980, M.B.A., 1981) – president of the New York City Economic Development Corporation, youngest Goldman Sachs partner in company history, university trustee
- Roger Altman (M.B.A. 1969) – founder and senior chairman of Evercore, United States deputy secretary of the treasury
- Victor J. Andrew (M.S. 1928, Ph.D. 1932) – founder of Andrew Corporation
- José Antonio Álvarez (M.B.A. 1996) – vice chairman and CEO of Santander Group, the largest Eurozone banking group by market value
- Cliff Asness (M.B.A, Ph.D.) – billionaire founder of AQR Capital
- Edward M. Baker (A.B. 1898) – investment broker
- Robert Barnett (J.D. 1971) – partner at the law firm Williams & Connolly LLP
- Bart Becht (M.B.A. 1982) – CEO of Reckitt Benckiser
- Paul G. Blazer (A.A. 1915) – founder of Ashland Oil & Refining Company (Ashland, Inc.)
- David G. Booth (M.B.A. 1971) – billionaire philanthropist, co-CEO and co-founder of Dimensional Fund Advisors
- Bill Browder (A.B. 1985) – CEO of Hermitage Capital Management and human rights activist
- Patrick O. Brown (AB 1976, PhD 1980, MD 1982) – CEO and founder of Impossible Foods
- Debra Cafaro (JD 1982) – chairman of the board and chief executive officer of Ventas, minority owner of the Pittsburgh Penguins
- Agustín Carstens (Ph.D. 1985) – head of the Bank for International Settlements known as "The Bank for Central Banks"; former governor of Bank of Mexico; current member of Group of Thirty (G-30)
- Tae-won Chey (Ph.D. 1989) – billionaire chairman of the SK Group, son-in-law of Korean president Roh Tae-woo
- Norton Clapp (Ph.B. 1928, J.D. 1929) – an original owner of Space Needle; university trustee
- William E. Conway Jr. (MBA) – billionaire co-founder of The Carlyle Group
- L. Gordon Crovitz (A.B. 1980) – publisher of The Wall Street Journal
- Daniel Doctoroff (J.D. 1984) – president of Bloomberg L.P.; former deputy mayor of New York City under Mayor Michael Bloomberg
- Arnold W. Donald (M.B.A. 1980) – CEO of Carnival Corporation & plc
- Brady Dougan (A.B. 1981, M.B.A., 1982) – CEO of Credit Suisse First Boston; CEO-elect of Credit Suisse Group in Zurich (beginning May 2007); youngest CEO on Wall Street (2004)
- J. Patrick Doyle (M.B.A. 1988) – president and CEO of Domino's Pizza
- Larry Ellison (did not graduate) – billionaire founder of Oracle; reportedly wealthiest person in California, third-richest in United States
- Marcel Erni (M.B.A. 1991) – billionaire co-founder of Partners Group
- Eugene Fama (Ph.D. 1964) – "father of modern finance"; 2013 Nobel laureate in Economics
- Jacob A. Frenkel (M.A., Ph.D.) – chairman of JPMorgan Chase International; chairman of the board of trustees of the Group of Thirty (G-30); former David Rockefeller Professor of International Economics at the University of Chicago; former governor of the Bank of Israel
- Diane Garnick (M.B.A. 2012) – chief income strategist of TIAA (2016–present)
- Gerald Gidwitz (Ph.B. 1927) – co-founder of Helene Curtis Industries, Inc.
- Scott Griffith (M.B.A. 1990) – CEO of Zipcar (2003–present)
- Timothy E. Hoeksema (M.B.A. 1977) – founder of Midwest Airlines
- Gary Hoover – founder of Bookstop and Hoover's
- Mark Hoplamazian (M.B.A. 1989) – CEO, Global Hyatt Corporation (2006–present)
- Daniel Ivascyn (M.B.A. 1998) – CIO of PIMCO
- Kenneth M. Jacobs (B.A. 1980) – chairman and CEO of Lazard; university trustee
- Stephen A. Jarislowsky (M.A. 1946) – billionaire founder of Jarislowsky Fraser Limited, one of Canada's largest investment management firms
- Porter Jarvis (M.B.A. 1932) – president, then chairman of Swift & Co., 1955–1967
- John H. Johnson (X. 1942) – founder of Johnson Publishing Company, publisher of Ebony and Jet magazines
- Karen Katen (B.A. Political science, M.B.A.) – pharmaceutical executive
- James M. Kilts (M.B.A. 1974) – chairman, president, and CEO of Gillette Company; founding partner of Centerview Partners
- Bon-Joon Koo (M.B.A.) – billionaire vice chairman of LG Electronics Corporation
- Martin Kruskal (S.B. 1945) – professor emeritus at Princeton University, started the soliton revolution in mathematics;
- Clark R. Landis (Ph.D. 1983) – chemist and professor of chemistry at the University of Wisconsin–Madison
- Carlos Langoni (PhD) – former president of the Central Bank of Brazil
- Sherry Lansing (Lab 1962) – chairman and CEO of Paramount Pictures
- Michael Larson (M.B.A. 1981) – chief investment officer of Cascade Investment, the investment vehicle for Bill Gates and his foundation
- Stephen Lee (Ph.D. 1986) – professor of Chemistry at Cornell University; MacArthur Fellow
- John Liew (BA 1989, MBA 1994, PhD 1995) – billionaire co-founder of AQR Capital
- Dave MacLennan (M.B.A.) – CEO of Cargill, the largest privately held corporation in the US
- Dennis Malamatinas (M.B.A. 1979) – former CEO of Burger King, Priceline Europe and Smirnoff
- Matt Maloney (M.B.A. 2010) – co-founder and former CEO of Grubhub
- Joe Mansueto (A.B. 1978, M.B.A. 1980) – billionaire chairman and CEO of Morningstar, Inc.
- Harry Markowitz (A.B. 1947, A.M. 1950, Ph.D. 1955) – "father of modern portfolio theory"; 1990 Nobel laureate in Economics
- Howard Marks (M.B.A. 1969) – billionaire founder of Oaktree Capital Management
- James O. McKinsey (B.Phil 1917, M.A. in Commerce 1919) – founder of McKinsey & Company; also served on the faculty of University of Chicago
- Peter Mensch (X, 1975, Masters in Marketing) – rock impresario
- John Meriwether (M.B.A. 1973) – CEO and principal of JWM Partners; former CEO of Long Term Capital Management
- Satya Nadella (M.B.A. 1997) – CEO of Microsoft
- Martin Nesbitt (M.B.A. 1991) – CEO of The Parking Spot, Treasurer of Barack Obama's 2008 presidential campaign
- Joseph Neubauer (M.B.A. 1965) – chairman and CEO of Aramark
- Brian Niccol (M.B.A. 2003) – CEO of Starbucks
- Victor Niederhoffer (Ph.D. 1969) – hedge fund manager, U.S. Squash Champion and Paddleball Champion, bestselling author, and statistician.
- Merle Norman – founder of Merle Norman Cosmetics
- John Opel (M.B.A. 1949) – president of IBM (1974–1983); CEO of IBM (1981–1985); chairman of IBM (1983–1986)
- Ferdinand Peck – businessman and philanthropist, best known for financing Chicago's Auditorium Building
- Peter Peterson (M.B.A. 1951) – billionaire co-founder and former chairman of Blackstone Group; 20th United States secretary of commerce
- Renaud de Planta (M.B.A. 1987) – the sole senior partner of the Pictet Group, a 215-year-old Swiss bank catering to the world's wealthiest individuals
- Michael Polsky (M.B.A. 1987) – billionaire founder of Invenergy, a multinational power generation development firm
- Matthew Prince (J.D. 2000) – billionaire co-founder and CEO of Cloudflare
- Anthony Pritzker (M.B.A. 1987) – billionaire member of the Pritzker family; founder and managing partner of the Pritzker Group
- Donald Pritzker (J.D. 1959) – member of the Pritzker family; former president of Hyatt Corporation
- Nicholas Pritzker (J.D. 1975) – billionaire member of the Pritzker family; former president of Hyatt Corporation and co-founder of Tao Capital
- Thomas Pritzker (J.D./M.B.A. 1976) – billionaire member of the Pritzker family; chairman and CEO of The Pritzker Organization and Executive Chairman of Hyatt Corporation
- Philip J. Purcell (M.B.A. 1967) – former chairman and CEO of Morgan Stanley Dean Witter
- Roberta Cooper Ramo (J.D.) – private practice lawyer, president of the American Law Institute
- Jay Rasulo (M.B.A. 1984) (AM 1982) – senior executive vice president and CFO of The Walt Disney Company
- Samuel Reshevsky (A.B. 1934) – accountant and chess grandmaster
- Laura Ricketts (A.B. 1994) – co-owner of Chicago Cubs, board member of Lambda Legal, gay rights activist
- Thomas S. Ricketts (A.B. 1988, M.B.A. 1993) – CEO of Incapital LLC; Director of TD Ameritrade; chairman of the Chicago Cubs
- David Rockefeller (Ph.D. 1940) – billionaire chairman of Chase Manhattan Bank (1969–81); former trustee of the University of Chicago
- Emmanuel Roman (M.B.A. 1987) – CEO of PIMCO
- David Rubenstein (J.D. 1973) – billionaire co-founder of The Carlyle Group
- David O. Sacks (J.D. 1998) – entrepreneur and venture capitalist; former COO of PayPal; former CEO of Zenefits and Yammer; co-founder and CEO of Craft Ventures
- Álvaro Saieh (AM’76, PhD’80) – billionaire chairman of the CorpGroup; seventh richest man in Chile
- Nassef Sawiris (A.B. 1982) – billionaire member of the Sawiris family; CEO of Orascom Construction; sixth richest man in Africa
- Evan Sharp (A.B. 2005) – billionaire co-founder and Chief Creative Officer of Pinterest
- Masaaki Shirakawa (M.A. 1977) – former governor of the Bank of Japan; current member of the Group of Thirty (G-30)
- Rex Sinquefield (MBA) – billionaire co-founder of Dimensional Fund Advisors
- Patrick Spain (A.B. 1974) – founder of Hoover's and HighBeam Research
- Robert Steel (M.B.A. 1984) – CEO of Wachovia Bank (2008–present); former vice-chairman of Goldman Sachs; former under secretary for Domestic Finance within the United States Department of the Treasury
- Dick Stoken (M.B.A., 1958) – founding partner in Lind-Waldock, head of Strategic Capital Management
- John Studzinski (M.B.A., 1980) – vice chairman of PIMCO, former vice chairman of The Blackstone Group, former head of the European investment banking division and deputy chairman of Morgan Stanley
- Anthony Tan (B.A. 2004) – co-founder and chief executive officer of Grab, a Nasdaq-listed e-hailing turned superapp technology company and first unicorn in Southeast Asia
- Marion A. Trozzolo (PhB 1947, M.B.A. 1950) – first United States manufacturer to apply teflon to cookware
- Vivian Tu (B.A. 2016) – founder and CEO of Your Rich BFF, a multi-media company that provides financial education
- Susan Wagner (M.B.A. 1984) – co-founder, former vice-chairman, and COO of BlackRock
- John S. Watson (M.B.A. 1980) – chairman and CEO of Chevron Corporation
- Jon Winkelried (A.B. & M.B.A. 1982) – CEO of TPG Capital and former COO of Goldman Sachs
- Changhong Zhu (Ph.D. 1998) – CIO of State Administration of Foreign Exchange manages China's $3.8 trillion reserves

== Crime ==
- William Cottrell (A.B. 2002) – former Ph.D. candidate at the California Institute of Technology, described by scientists as a "genius", convicted in April 2005 of conspiracy to arson of 8 sport utility vehicles and a Hummer dealership in the name of the Earth Liberation Front (ELF)
- Leopold and Loeb (attended) – murderers
- Eric Muenter (A.B. 1899) – German-American political terrorist, activist, spy, and would-be assassin

== Education ==
- Eleanor Churchill Gibbs – educator, writer
- Mari Ruef Hofer – pioneer in the kindergarten movement
- Deborah Meier (A.M. 1955) – founder of small schools in New York and Boston; recipient of MacArthur Fellowship

== Entertainment ==
- Ed Asner (X. 1948) – Emmy Award-winning actor, The Mary Tyler Moore Show, Lou Grant, Up, Elf
- David Auburn (A.B. 1991) – playwright; winner of the Pulitzer Prize and Tony Award for Proof
- Elvin Bishop (X, 1972) – rock musician; blues icon
- Eric Bogosian (X, 1971) – actor; playwright
- Anna Chlumsky (A.B. 2002) – actress; film My Girl and TV series Veep
- Misha Collins (A.B. 1997) – actor; star of TV series Supernatural
- Kahane Cooperman (A.B. 1980) – documentary filmmaker and television producer
- Jan Crull Jr. (A.M. 1984) – documentary filmmaker
- Roger De Koven (1930) – actor on stage, radio, film and TV; star of Peabody Award-winning radio drama Against the Storm
- Katherine Dunham (Ph.B. 1936) – dancer and choreographer, National Medal of Arts winner
- Roger Ebert (X. 1970) – film critic and Pulitzer Prize winner
- Kurt Elling (X. 1992) – jazz singer and nine-time Grammy Award nominee
- Jonathan Elliott (Ph.D. 1988) – classical composer
- George R. Ellis (A.B. 1959, M.F.A. 1962) – author, art historian and director of the Honolulu Museum of Art
- David B. Eskind (X. 1934) – radio scriptwriter, producer
- Irwin Leroy Fischer (A.B. 1924) – classical composer, former dean of faculty American Conservatory of Music and former principal organist Chicago Symphony Orchestra
- Melvin Frank (A.B. 1935) – Academy Award-nominated filmmaker and screenwriter, A Touch of Class
- Philip Glass (A.B. 1956) – Academy Award-nominated composer and musician
- John Grierson (A.M. 1927) – coined the word "documentary"; founder of the British documentary film movement; founded and headed Canada's National Film Board during World War II; director of mass communications for UNESCO, 1948–50
- Sessue Hayakawa (A.B. 1913) – Academy Award-nominated film actor; starred in Cecil B. DeMille's The Cheat and Bridge on the River Kwai
- Marilu Henner (X. 1974) – actress; starred in TV series Taxi
- Mark Hollmann (A.B. 1985) – Tony Award-winning composer
- Celeste Holm (X. 1934) – Academy Award-winning actress, Gentleman's Agreement, All About Eve, High Society
- Irene Whitfield Holmes (Ph.D. 1924) – ethnomusicologist and collector of French language American folk songs
- Rebecca Jarvis (A.B. 2003) – runner-up on the fourth season of The Apprentice
- Philip Kaufman (A.B. 1958) – film director, The Right Stuff, The Unbearable Lightness of Being
- Rose Kaufman (X. 1959) – screenwriter, The Wanderers and Henry & June
- Greg Kotis (A.B. 1988) – Tony Award-winning playwright
- Gerald Levinson (A.M. 1974, PhD 1977) – classical composer
- Brian Liesegang (A.B. 1992) – guitarist, former member of Nine Inch Nails and Filter
- T. D. A. Lingo (S.B., S.M.) – folk singer, radio personality, and brain researcher
- Aaron Lipstadt (A.B. 1974) – director
- Joshua Marston (A.M. 1994) – film director, Maria Full of Grace
- Tucker Max (A.B. 1998) – Internet celebrity and New York Times bestselling author
- Elaine May (audited) – screenwriter, actress, and director, comedian with Nichols and May, Oscar-nominated writer of Heaven Can Wait and Primary Colors, director of A New Leaf and The Heartbreak Kid
- Harry Morgan (X. 1937) – actor
- Mike Nichols (X. 1953) – film and stage director; winner of a Tony Award and an Academy Award; directed The Graduate, Who's Afraid of Virginia Woolf?, Catch-22, Silkwood; co-founder of the Second City comedy troupe
- Sheldon Patinkin (A.B. 1953) – theater director
- Kimberly Peirce (A.B. 1990) – film director, Boys Don't Cry (Academy Award for Best Actress, Hilary Swank) and Stop-Loss
- Gordon Quinn (A.B. 1965) – filmmaker, founder of Kartemquin Films
- Bernard Sahlins (A.B. 1943) – co-founder of the Second City comedy troupe
- Hayden Schlossberg (A.B. 2000) – screenwriter, Harold & Kumar Go to White Castle
- Eddie Shin (A.B. 1998) – actor
- Paul Sills (A.B. 1951) – co-founder of the Second City comedy troupe
- Arieh Smith (A.B. 2012) – polyglot and creator of Youtube Channel Xiaomanyc
- David Steinberg – comedian, actor, writer, director, and author
- Michael Stevens (A.B. 2008) – creator of educational YouTube channel Vsauce
- Fritz Weaver (A.B. 1951) – actor, Holocaust, Fail-Safe, Black Sunday
- Gavin Williamson – harpsichordist
- Arthur Zegart – documentary film producer

== Journalism ==
- Rick Atkinson (A.M. 1976) – reporter and author, four-time Pulitzer Prize winner
- David Blum (A.B. 1977) – editor-in-chief of the Village Voice (2006–present)
- David Broder (A.B. 1947, A.M. 1951) – Pulitzer Prize winner for commentary (1973); political correspondent and columnist for The Washington Post
- David Brooks (A.B. 1983) – political commentator; columnist for The New York Times; senior editor of The Weekly Standard; regular commentator on The NewsHour with Jim Lehrer
- Ana Marie Cox (A.B. 1994) – liberal columnist, founding editor of the Wonkette blog, correspondent for Air America Media
- Roger Ebert (X. 1970) – Pulitzer Prize winner for film criticism (1975); columnist for the Chicago Sun-Times
- Zilfa Estcourt (A.M. 1905) – newspaper columnist and editor at the Tacoma Tribune and San Francisco Chronicle
- Janet Flanner – writer and journalist who served as the Paris correspondent of The New Yorker magazine from 1925 until she retired in 1975
- Thomas Frank (A.M. 1989, Ph.D. 1994) – editor-in-chief of The Baffler; author of The Conquest of Cool (1997) and What's the Matter with Kansas? (2004)
- Martin Gardner (A.B. 1936) – author and columnist of "Mathematical Games" in Scientific American
- Jarlath J. Graham (A. B. 1949) – editor of Advertising Age, and executive at Crain Communications
- Katharine Graham (A.B. 1938) – publisher of The Washington Post for over two decades; Pulitzer Prize winner for her memoir Personal History (1998)
- Virginia Graham (A.S. 1934) – television news correspondent; prosecution witness in the Tate-LaBianca murders trial
- Jan Crawford Greenburg (J.D. 1993) – chief legal correspondent for CBS News
- Nathan Hare (A.M. 1957, Ph.D. 1962) – author, activist, and sociologist; founding publisher of The Black Scholar, later cited as "the most important journal devoted to black issues since the Crisis" by The New York Times
- Seymour Hersh (A.B. 1958) – Pulitzer Prize-winning investigative journalist and author, most famous for exposing the My Lai Massacre, which greatly changed public opinion of the Vietnam War; frequent contributor to The New Yorker
- Daniel Hertzberg (A.B. 1968) – Pulitzer Prize winner 1988; managing editor of The Wall Street Journal
- DeWitt John (A.M. 1937) – journalist and editor
- Richard Lloyd Jones (LL.B. 1897, LL.M. 1898) – longtime publisher of the Tulsa Tribune
- Raymond A. Joseph (M.A. 1963, Social Anthropology) The Wall Street Journal (1971–1984), Co-founded in 1971 with his brother Leopold, the Haiti-Observateur, a trilingual weekly (French, Haitian Creole and English), for which he still writes, more than 50 years later.
- Dave Kehr (A.B. 1975) – film critic for The New York Times
- Sarah Koenig (A.B. 1990) – creator of the award-winning Serial podcast
- Tal Kopan (A.B.) – political reporter for CNN
- Sarah Langs (A.B. 2015) – reporter and statistician for MLB.com and ESPN
- Harvey Levin (J.D. 1975) – managing editor of TMZ.com
- Roderick MacLeish (A.B. 1947) – National Public Radio political commentator; journalist and author
- John G. Morris (A.B. 1937) – photo editor for Life, Ladies' Home Journal, The Washington Post, The New York Times, National Geographic
- Greg Palast (A.B. 1974, M.B.A. 1976) – progressive investigative journalist
- John Podhoretz (A.B. 1982) – conservative commentator for the National Review, the New York Post, and The Weekly Standard
- Joshua Cooper Ramo (A.B. 1992) – former foreign editor, Time Magazine; managing director, Kissinger Associates
- David E. Reed (A.B. 1946) – roving editor, Reader's Digest; author, 111 Days in Stanleyville (1965); Up Front in Vietnam (1967); Save the Hostages (1988)
- Emmett Rensin – contributor to the Los Angeles Times' "Opinion Blog", USA Today, Salon, New Republic, and the Los Angeles Review of Books
- Edward Rothstein (Ph.D. 1994) – cultural critic at The New York Times; former music critic at the New Republic and The New York Times
- Nate Silver (A.B. 2000) – sabermetrician and inventor of PECOTA; writer for Baseball Prospectus; and founder of FiveThirtyEight.com
- Robert B. Silvers (A.B. 1947) – co-founding editor of The New York Review of Books
- Brent Staples (A.M. 1976, Ph.D. 1982) – editorial writer for The New York Times (1990–present); winner of the Anisfield-Wolf Book Award for his memoir Parallel Time: Growing Up in Black and White (1994)
- Bret Stephens (A.B. 1995) – foreign-affairs columnist and deputy editorial page editor of The Wall Street Journal; winner of the 2013 Pulitzer Prize for Commentary
- Ray Suarez (A.M. 1993) – host of Inside Story on Al Jazeera America, former senior correspondent on The NewsHour with Jim Lehrer
- Ken Taylor (Ph.D. 1984) – co-host of radio program Philosophy Talk; Professor of Philosophy, Stanford University
- Neda Ulaby (A.M. 1996) – National Public Radio reporter
- Mickey Waldman (A.B. 1965) – WBAI radio host and producer

== Law ==
- Shimon Agranat (J.D. 1929) – president of the Supreme Court of Israel (1965–1976)
- John Ashcroft (J.D. 1967) – attorney general of the United States (2001–2005)
- Kwamena Bentsi-Enchill (J.S.D.) – judge and academic; justice of the Supreme Court of Ghana (1971–1972)
- Paul Bloom (1939–2009) – lawyer who recovered $6 billion for the United States Department of Energy
- Robert H. Bork (A.B. 1948, J.D. 1953) – attorney general of the United States (1973–1974); United States Court of Appeals judge (1982–1988)
- Ramsey Clark (A.M. 1950, J.D. 1951) – attorney general of the United States (1967–1969)
- Frank H. Easterbrook (J.D. 1973) – circuit judge, United States Seventh Circuit Court of Appeals
- Allison H. Eid (J.D. 1991) – 95th justice of the Colorado Supreme Court
- Troy Eid (J.D. 1991) – United States attorney for the District of Colorado (2006–2009)
- Noel Francisco (A.B. 1991, J.D. 1996) – 47th solicitor general of the United States
- Jerome Frank (A.B. 1909, J.D. 1912) – legal philosopher, judge of United States Court of Appeals for the Second Circuit, chairman of the Securities and Exchange Commission
- Douglas H. Ginsburg (J.D. 1973) – chief judge, United States Court of Appeals for the District of Columbia Circuit
- Peter Jambrek (Ph.D. 1971) – president of the Constitutional Court (1991–1993) and Minister of the Interior of Slovenia (2000), member of the European Court for Human Rights (1993–1999)
- Larry Krasner (A.B. 1983) – district attorney of Philadelphia since 2018 and former federal public defender
- Rex E. Lee (J.D. 1963) – 37th solicitor general of the United States
- Thomas Rex Lee (J.D. 1991) – associate justice of the Utah Supreme Court (2010–2022)
- Edward Levi (A.B. 1932, J.D. 1935) – attorney general of the United States (1975–1977)
- Paul Alan Levy (J.D. 1976) – attorney at Public Citizen specializing in Internet-related free speech issues
- Michael W. McConnell (J.D. 1979) – circuit judge, United States Tenth Circuit Court of Appeals
- James B. Parsons (A.M. 1946, J.D. 1949) – first African-American Federal District Court Judge (1991–1992)
- Kyle Sampson (J.D. 1996) – chief of staff and counselor of United States Attorney General Alberto Gonzales
- David Schuman (Ph.D. 1974) – Oregon Court of Appeals judge
- Ed Siskel (J.D. 1997) – White House Counsel (2023-2025)
- John Paul Stevens (A.B. 1941) – United States Supreme Court Justice (1975–2010)
- John Thomas (J.D. 1970) – Lord Chief Justice of England and Wales

== Librarianship ==
- L. Zenobia Coleman (1898–1999) – librarian
- Mary Elizabeth Downey – librarian; director of the Chautauqua School for Librarians
- Jeannette Howard Foster (Ph.D. 1935) – librarian, professor, and researcher
- Carla Hayden (Ph.D. 1977) – 14th Librarian of Congress
- Alice Rebecca Brooks McGuire (Ph.D. 1958) – professor of library science, president of the American Association of School Librarians (1953–1954)
- Passie Fenton Ottley (Honorary D. Litt. 1926) – chair of the Georgia State Library Commission
- Althea Warren – president of the American Library Association 1943–1944

== Literature ==
- David Axelrod (A.B. 1977) – author and former senior advisor to President Barack Obama
- Saul Bellow (X. 1939) – author, Pulitzer Prize winner and Nobel Prize winner
- Allan Bloom (Ph.B. 1949, A.M. 1953, Ph.D. 1955) – author
- Paul C. Borgman (Ph.D. 1973) – religious author and professor
- Dmitri Borgmann (Ph.B.) – writer
- Alice C. Browning (Ph.B. 1931) – writer, editor of Negro Story (1944–1946)
- Ernest Callenbach (Ph.B. 1949, A.M. 1953) – writer
- Bonnie Jo Campbell (A.B. 1984) – novelist and short story writer
- Paul Carroll (A.M. 1952) – poet
- Hayden Carruth (A.M. 1947) – winner of National Book Award in poetry
- Robert Coover (A.M. 1965) – novelist and short story writer
- Will Cuppy (Ph.B. 1907, A.M. 1914) – humorist
- Mu Dan (A.M. 1951) – Chinese poet and literary translator
- Frances Gardiner Davenport (Ph.D. 1904) – writer, editor of the series European Treaties Bearing on the History of the United States and its Dependencies
- Sebastian de Grazia (A.B. 1944, Ph.D. 1948) – Pulitzer Prize winner
- Angie Debo (A.M. 1924, international relations) –author of And the Waters Still Run: The Betrayal of the Five Civilized Tribes (1940)
- Caitlin Doughty – mortician, author, and promoter of death acceptance
- Phyllis Eisenstein – author of science fiction and fantasy short stories and novels
- Joseph Epstein (A.B. 1959) – essayist, literary critic, and short story writer
- James T. Farrell (X. 1929) – novelist, short story writer, journalist, travel writer, poet and literary critic
- Richard Garfinkle (X. 1980) – science fiction and fantasy author, author of Celestial Matters
- Paul Goodman (Ph.D. 1954) – social critic
- Gerald Graff (A.B. 1959) – president-elect of the Modern Language Association (2008)
- Katharine Graham (A.B. 1938) – author, Pulitzer Prize winner
- Sam Greenlee (1954–57) – writer, author of The Spook Who Sat by the Door
- Chen Hengzhe (M.A) – writer of modern vernacular Chinese literature
- Daryl Hine (Ph.D. 1967) – poet and translator
- Bette Howland (A.B. 1955) – writer, literary critic, MacArthur Fellow
- Tyehimba Jess (A.B. 1991) – Pulitzer Prize-winning poet
- Fenton Johnson – poet
- Cyril M. Kornbluth – science fiction author
- Patrick Larkin (A.B. 1982) – author of espionage, military, and historical thrillers
- Stephen Leacock (Ph.D. 1903) – humourist
- Luis Leal (A.B. 1941, Ph.D. 1950) – literary scholar and winner of National Humanities Medal
- Seth Lerer (Ph.D. 1981) – former Stanford professor; dean of arts and humanities at the University of California, San Diego (2009–2014)
- Jackson Mac Low (A.A. 1943) – poet, winner of Wallace Stevens award
- Norman Maclean (Ph.D. 1940) – author of A River Runs Through It
- Tom Mandel – contemporary poet whose work is often associated with the language poets
- Campbell McGrath (A.B. 1984) – poet, MacArthur Fellow
- Susan Murphy-Milano (B.A. 1981) – non-fiction author and victims' advocate
- Sterling North (A.B. 1929) – children's author
- Norman Panama (A.B. 1936) – screenwriter and film director
- Sara Paretsky (A.M. 1969, M.B.A. 1977, Ph.D. 1977) – crime novelist
- Rick Perlstein (B.A. 1992) – author of Nixonland: The Rise of a President and the Fracturing of America and Before the Storm: Barry Goldwater and the Unmaking of the American Consensus
- Elizabeth Peters (Ph.B. 1947, A.M. 1950, Ph.D. 1952) – mystery author
- Joseph G. Peterson (A.B. 1988) – author and poet
- Robert Pirsig (attended but did not graduate) – philosopher, author of Zen and the Art of Motorcycle Maintenance and Lila: An Inquiry into Morals
- Edouard Roditi – writer and translator
- Leo Rosten (Ph.B. 1930, Ph.D. 1937) – humorist
- Philip Roth (A.M. 1955) – author, Pulitzer Prize and National Medal of Arts winner
- Aram Saroyan (X c.1965) – writer, poet, and dramatist, author of famous minimalist poems such as "lighght"
- John Scalzi (B.A. 1991) – novelist
- Susan Fromberg Schaeffer (B.A. 1961, M.A. 1963, Ph.D. 1966) – novelist, poet and professor
- Susan Sontag (A.B. 1951) – author, filmmaker and activist, MacArthur Fellow
- George Steiner (A.B. 1948) – literary critic
- Nancy Tilly (M.A.) – children’s author
- Studs Terkel (Ph.B. 1932, J.D. 1934) – writer and radio host; Pulitzer Prize winner for the Good War: An Oral History of World War II (1985); National Humanities Medal (1997)
- Carl Van Vechten (1903) – writer of novels such as Nigger Heaven and prolific portrait photographer
- Herman Voaden (X) – playwright and social activist
- Kurt Vonnegut Jr. (A.M. 1971) – author of Cat's Cradle, Slaughterhouse-Five, Breakfast of Champions
- Cecelia Watson (A.M. 2005, Ph.D. 2011) – nonfiction author and academic
- Edward F. Wente (Ph.D. 1959) – professor and Egyptologist
- Yvor Winters (attended) – poet and critic
- Norman Wong (A.B. 1986) – writer
- Marguerite Young – novelist and poet

== Mathematics ==
- Abraham Adrian Albert (B.S. 1926, S.M. 1927, Ph.D. 1928)
- George Birkhoff (Ph.D. 1907) – Bôcher Memorial Prize winner
- Archie Blake (S.M. 1931, Ph.D. 1937)
- Gilbert Ames Bliss (Ph.D. 1900)
- Alberto Calderón (Ph.D. 1950) – co-founded the Chicago school of mathematical analysis; winner of Bôcher Memorial Prize, the Wolf Prize, and the National Medal of Science
- Wei-Liang Chow (B.A. 1931) – known for work in algebraic geometry
- Paul J. Cohen (S.M. 1954, Ph.D. 1958) – Fields Medal winner
- Gertrude Crocker (B.S. 1911)
- William Dembski (Ph.D. 1988)
- David Eisenbud (Ph.D. 1970)
- Bernard Galler (Ph.D. 1955)
- Murray Gerstenhaber (MA and Ph.D. 1951) – mathematician and lawyer
- Richard Hamming (B.S. 1947) – Turing Award winner
- Thomas W. Hungerford (Ph.D. 1963)
- John Irwin Hutchinson (Ph.D. 1896)
- Apoorva Khare (Ph.D. 2006)
- Ernest Preston Lane (Ph.D. 1918)
- Richard Lyons
- Saunders MacLane (A.M. 1931) – co-founder of category theory
- Margaret Evelyn Mauch (Ph.D. 1938)
- Janet McDonald (Ph.D. 1943) – mathematician
- Anil Nerode (Ph.D. 1956)
- Ken Ono (B.A. 1989)
- Alice Turner Schafer (Ph.D. 1942)
- Richard D. Schafer (Ph.D. 1942)
- Reinhard Schultz (Ph.D. 1968)
- Isadore Singer (Ph.D. 1955) – Abel Prize winner
- Elias M. Stein (Ph.D. 1959)
- John Thompson (Ph.D. 1959) – world leader in group theory, Fields Medal and National Medal of Science winner
- Oswald Veblen (Ph.D. 1903)
- George W. Whitehead (Ph.D. 1941)
- Dudley Weldon Woodard (M.S. 1907)

== Medicine ==
- Charles F. Barlow (B.S. 1945, M.D. 1947) – pediatric neurologist and professor at Harvard Medical School
- Ann Weiser Cornell (Ph.D. 1975) – psychotherapist; authority on focusing; author of The Power of Focusing
- Carol Blanche Cotton (Ph.D. 1939) – early African-American female psychologist
- Marion Danis (M.D. 1975) – bioethicist and physician-scientist at the National Institutes of Health Clinical Center
- Robert Gallo (Resident in Medicine 1963–1965) – identified first retrovirus in humans
- Maurice Hilleman (Ph.D. 1941) – leading microbiologist specialising in vaccinology, whose vaccines save nearly 8 million lives each year
- Donald Hopkins (M.D. 1966) – MacArthur Fellow (1995); acting director (1985) of the Centers for Disease Control
- Kathy Hudson (MSc) – microbiologist specializing in science policy
- John D. Hunter 2004 – neurobiologist
- Sarah H. Kagan – Lucy Walker Honorary Term Professor of Gerontological Nursing at the University of Pennsylvania; MacArthur Fellow in 2003
- Leon Kass (S.B. 1958, M.D. 1962) – chairman of the President's Council on Bioethics; Addie Clark Harding Professor in the Committee on Social Thought; Hertog Fellow in Social Thought at the American Enterprise Institute
- Andrew S. Levey (B.A. 1972) – nephrologist, medical researcher, and professor, Tufts University School of Medicine
- Fushih Pan (M.D. 1986, Ph.D. 1989) – plastic surgeon; developer of the MIRA procedure
- Anne L. Peters – physician, diabetologist and professor of clinical medicine at the Keck School of Medicine of USC
- Joseph Ransohoff (M.D. 1941) – pioneer in the field of neurosurgery; founder of the first neurosurgical intensive care unit; chief of neurosurgery at NYU Medical Center
- Maurice H. Rees – medical educator, dean of University of Colorado School of Medicine 1925–1945
- Janet Rowley (Ph.B. 1944, S.B. 1946, M.D. 1948) – discovered translocation on chromosome 9 resulted in the Philadelphia chromosome, and had implications for specific types of leukemia; her work has influenced further research into cancer genetics
- Paul S. Russell (B.A. 1944, B.S. 1945, M.D. 1947) – physician
- Ann Linnea Sandberg (Ph.D. 1964) – immunologist at National Institute of Dental and Craniofacial Research
- Esther Somerfeld-Ziskind – neurologist and psychiatrist
- Samuel Stanley – MD, immunologist, biomedical researcher and 5th president of Stony Brook University
- David Talmage – professor of Medicine, discovered the clonal selection theory
- Richard E. Tracy (Ph.D. 1961) – forensic pathologist
- Eve van Cauter – sleep medicine director; one of the first people to discover that sleep deprivation affects the body
- Adah Elizabeth Verder (B.S. 1923, Ph.D.1928) – medical bacteriologist and researcher at the National Institute of Allergy and Infectious Diseases
- John B. Watson (Ph.D. 1903) – psychologist who popularized the scientific theory of behaviorism

== Military ==
- Benjamin O. Davis Jr. (X. 1933) – general of the United States Air Force (1954); assistant secretary of transportation under Richard Nixon

== Nobel laureates ==
- Luis Alvarez (A.B. 1932, S.M. 1934, Ph.D. 1936) – Physics, 1968
- Emily Green Balch (attended) – Peace, 1946
- Moungi Bawendi (Ph.D. 1988) – Chemistry, 2023
- Gary Becker (A.M. 1953, Ph.D. 1955) – Economics, 1992
- Saul Bellow (X. 1939) – Literature, 1976
- Bruce A. Beutler (M.D. 1981) – Medicine, 2011
- Herbert Brown (S.B. 1936, Ph.D. 1938) – Chemistry, 1979
- James M. Buchanan (Ph.D. 1948) – Economics, 1986
- Owen Chamberlain (Ph.D. 1949) – Physics, 1959
- James Cronin (S.M. 1953, Ph.D. 1955) – Physics, 1980
- Clinton Davisson (S.B. 1909) – Physics, 1937
- Eugene Fama (M.B.A. 1963, Ph.D. 1964) – Economics, 2013
- Jerome Friedman (A.B. 1950, S.M. 1953, Ph.D. 1956) – Physics, 1990
- Milton Friedman (A.M. 1933) – Economics, 1976
- Claudia Goldin (Ph.D. 1972) – Economics, 2023
- John B. Goodenough (Ph.D. 1952) – Chemistry, 2019
- John M. Jumper (Ph.D. 2017) – Chemistry, 2024
- Tsung-Dao Lee (Ph.D. 1950) – Physics, 1957
- Robert Lucas Jr. (A.B. 1959, Ph.D. 1964) – Economics, 1995
- Harry Markowitz (A.B. 1947, A.M. 1950, Ph.D. 1955) – Economics, 1990
- Robert Mulliken (Ph.D. 1921) – Chemistry, 1966
- Paul Romer (S.B. 1977, Ph.D. 1983) – Economics, 2018
- Irwin Rose (S.B. 1948, Ph.D. 1952) – Chemistry, 2004
- F. Sherwood Rowland (S.M. 1951, Ph.D. 1952) – Chemistry, 1995
- Paul Samuelson (A.B. 1935) – Economics, 1970
- Myron Scholes (M.B.A. 1964, Ph.D. 1969) – Economics, 1997
- Herbert A. Simon (A.B. 1936, Ph.D. 1943) – Economics, 1978
- George E. Smith (Ph.D. 1959) – Physics, 2009
- Roger Sperry (Ph.D. 1941) – Medicine, 1981
- Jack Steinberger (S.B. 1942; Ph.D. 1949) – Physics, 1988
- George Stigler (S.B. 1942, Ph.D. 1949) – Economics, 1982
- Edward Lawrie Tatum (X. 1931) – Medicine, 1958
- Daniel Tsui (S.M. 1963, Ph.D. 1967) – Physics, 1998
- James Dewey Watson (S.B. 1947) – Medicine, 1962
- Frank Wilczek (A.B. 1970) – Physics, 2004; MacArthur Fellow (1982)
- Michael Woodford (A.B. 1977) – Economics, 2026; MacArthur Fellow (1981)
- Chen Ning Yang (Ph.D. 1948) – Physics, 1957

== Politics ==
=== Heads of state or of government ===
- Hastings Banda (Ph.B. 1931) – prime minister of Malawi (1964–1966, 1966–1994)
- William Lyon Mackenzie King (A.M. 1897) – prime minister of Canada (1935–1948)
- Lien Chan (Ph.D. 1965) – premier of the Republic of China (1993–1997)
- Álvaro Magaña (A.M. 1955) – president of El Salvador (1982–1984)
- Geoffrey Palmer (J.D. 1967) – prime minister of New Zealand (1989–1990)
- Gonzalo Sánchez de Lozada (A.B. 1952) – president of Bolivia (1993–97, 2002–2003)
- Kateryna Yushchenko (M.B.A. 1986) – First Lady of Ukraine (2005–2010)

=== U.S. Senate and House ===
- William Holmes Brown (J.D. 1954) – parliamentarian of the United States House of Representatives (1974–1994)
- Elizabeth Cheney (J.D. 1996) – member of the United States House of Representatives from Wyoming (2017–2023) and daughter of former U.S. Vice President Richard Cheney
- James I. Dolliver (J.D. 1921) – United States House of Representatives from Iowa's 6th congressional district (1945–1957)
- Ro Khanna (A.B. 1998) – member of the United States House of Representatives from California's 17th district (2017–present)
- Andy Kim (A.B. 2004) – member of the United States Senate from New Jersey (2024–present), United States House of Representatives (2019–2024), and former national security adviser for Barack Obama
- Amy Klobuchar (J.D. 1985) – United States Senate (D-MN) (2007–present)
- David M. McIntosh (J.D. 1983) – United States House of Representatives from Indiana's 2nd district, President of the Club for Growth
- Abner J. Mikva (J.D. 1951) –United States House of Representatives; United States Court of Appeals judge (1979–1994)
- Patsy Mink (J.D. 1951) – United States House of Representatives (D-HI) (1965–1977, 1990–2002)
- Carol Moseley Braun (J.D. 1972) – United States Senate (D-IL) (1992–1998); United States ambassador (1999–2001)
- Mike Quigley (M.P.P. 1985) – United States House of Representatives from Illinois's 5th congressional district
- Bernie Sanders (A.B. 1964) – United States senator (VT); United States House of Representatives; 2016 and 2020 presidential candidate
- Jim Talent (J.D. 1981) – United States senator (R-Mo) (2002–2007)
- Joe Walsh – United States House of Representatives;from Illinois's 8th congressional district (M.P.P. 1991)
- Todd Young (M.B.A. 2000) – United States Senate from Indiana (2017–present)

=== Governors ===
- Charles W. Bryan (1867–1945) – 20th and 23rd governor of Nebraska
- Jon S. Corzine (M.B.A. 1973) – governor of New Jersey (D) (2006–2010); United States senator (D-NJ) (2001–2006); former chairman and CEO of Goldman Sachs; University trustee
- William J. Holloway (A.B. 1910) – 8th governor of Oklahoma (1929–1931)
- Jack Markell (M.B.A. 1985) – governor of Delaware (2009–2017)
- Pete Ricketts (A.B. 1986, M.B.A. 1991) – 40th governor of Nebraska (2015–2023); United States Senate (R-NE) (2023–present)

=== U.S. state legislatures ===
- Daniel Ankeles (A.B. 2004) – member of the Maine House of Representatives (2022–present)
- Lindsey Burke (A.M. 2012) – lawyer and member of the Kentucky house of representatives (2023–present)
- John E. Cashman (J.D.) – member of the Wisconsin Senate from the 1st district (1923–1938, 1941–1946)
- Lycurgus Conner (A.B., J.D.) – member of the Illinois House of Representatives (1961–1963)
- Jackie Goldberg (M.A.T. 1973) – California State Assembly member (2000–2006)
- Anne Kaiser (A.B. 1990) – member of the Maryland House of Delegates
- Harold C. Kessinger – Illinois state legislator; newspaper editor and publisher
- Richard A. Mugalian – Illinois state representative and lawyer
- Jennifer Stewart – Rhode Island House of Representatives
- Lucille Whipper (M.A. 1955) – South Carolina House of Representatives from 1986 to 1996

=== Local politics ===
- Marvin Braude (A.B. 1941) – member of Los Angeles City Council (1965–1997)
- Brad Lander (A.B. 1991) – 45th New York City comptroller and former New York City Council member, 39th district
- Lori Lightfoot (J.D. 1989) – mayor of Chicago (2019–2023)

=== Other U.S. politics and government ===
- Bernard W. Aronson (A.B. 1967) – United States assistant secretary of state for Western Hemisphere Affairs (1989–1993)
- Lisa Brown (J.D. 1986) – White House staff secretary (2009–2011)
- Benjamin V. Cohen (Ph.B 1914, J.D. 1915) – member of President Franklin D. Roosevelt's brain trust
- James Comey (J.D. 1985) – seventh director of the Federal Bureau of Investigation
- Richard Cordray (J.D. 1986) – 1st director of the Consumer Financial Protection Bureau, 49th attorney general of Ohio, 46th treasurer of Ohio
- Jon Dudas (J.D.) – former director of the United States Patent and Trademark Office, under secretary of Commerce for Intellectual Property
- Anastasia Golovashkina (A.B. 2015) – social media director for Elizabeth Warren's 2020 presidential campaign
- Avril Haines (A.B. 1992) – deputy director of the CIA (2013–2015), deputy National Security advisor (2015–2017), director of National Intelligence (2021–2025), president of the Carnegie Endowment for International Peace (2026–present)
- Alexander Hoehn-Saric (A.B. 1991) – chairman of the U.S. Consumer Product Safety Commission (2021–2025)
- Constance Horner (A.M. 1967) – member of the United States Commission on Civil Rights (1993–1998); public official in the Reagan and first Bush administrations, independent director of Pfizer, Prudential Financial, and Ingersoll Rand
- Harold LeClair Ickes (A.B. 1897, J.D. 1907) – United States secretary of the interior (1933–1946)
- Fred Ikle (A.M. 1948, Ph.D. 1950) – former under secretary of Defense for Policy; director of U.S. Arms Control and Disarmament Agency (1973–1977)
- Justin Yifu Lin (Ph.D. 1986) – senior vice president and first chief economist from a developing country for the World Bank (2008–present)
- Robert Todd Lincoln (J.D. 1867) – 35th United States secretary of war
- Eliot Ness (A.B. 1925) – United States Treasury and Bureau of Prohibition agent, head of The Untouchables
- Ajit Pai (J.D. 1997) – chairman of the Federal Communications Commission (2017–2021)
- Peter George Peterson (M.B.A. 1951) – United States secretary of commerce (1972–1973)
- Abraham A. Ribicoff (J.D. 1933) – 4th United States secretary of Health, Education, and Welfare, 80th governor of Connecticut
- Paul Romer (B.A. 1977, Ph.D. 1983) – chief economist of the World Bank
- Paul Wolfowitz (Ph.D. 1972) – president of the World Bank (2005–2007); United States deputy secretary of defense (2001–2005)
- David Medina – political advisor

=== Diplomats ===
- Harvey Feldman (A.B. ?, A.M. 1954) –United States ambassador to Papua New Guinea and the Solomon Islands (1979–1981); drafter of the Taiwan Relations Act,
- James Hormel (J.D. 1958) – United States ambassador to Luxembourg (1999–2001)
- Raymond A. Joseph (M.A. 1963) – Haitian Ambassador to the United States; author
- Zalmay Khalilzad (Ph.D. 1979) – U.S. ambassador to the United Nations (2007–2009); former U.S. ambassador to Afghanistan
- Jewel Lafontant (J.D. 1946) – United Nations delegate

=== Other countries ===
- Ahmed Chalabi (Ph.D. 1969) – interim Oil Minister and deputy prime minister of Iraq
- Francisco Gil Diaz (Ph.D. 1972) – former secretary of Finance and Public Credit of Mexico (2000–2006)
- Paulo Guedes (Ph.D. 1978) – Brazilian Minister of the Economy
- Emily Hunt (A.B. 2001), Adviser to the UK government under Boris Johnson, Liz Truss and Rishi Sunak. Appointed an Officer of the Order of the British Empire in 2023.
- Patricia Kabbah (A.M. 1963) – former first lady of Sierra Leone
- Koh Tsu Koon (Ph.D. 1977) – third chief minister of the State of Penang, Malaysia (1990–2008)
- Alexander Krasnoshchyokov (J.D. 1912) – first chairman of the Government of the Far Eastern Republic
- Lien Chan (Ph.D. 1965) – vice president of the Republic of China (Taiwan) under President Lee Teng-hui (1996–2000)
- Ochola Ogaye Mak'Anyengo – Kenyan trade unionist and politician
- Antonio Martino (M.B.A. 1968) – Italian Minister of Defence (2001–2006), minister of foreign affairs (1994–1995), and scholar
- Mei Ju-ao (J.D. 1928) – Chinese judicial delegate to the Tokyo War Crimes Tribunal
- Amien Rais (Ph.D. 1984) – chairman of the People's Consultative Assembly (MPR) of the Republic of Indonesia
- Marco Antonio Mena Rodríguez – governor-elect of Tlaxcala
- Masaaki Shirakawa (A.M. 1977) – governor, Bank of Japan (2008–present)
- Lorenzo Bini Smaghi (Ph.D. 1988) – member of the Executive Board of the European Central Bank; economist

== Religion ==
- Thomas J. J. Altizer (A.B. 1948, A.M. 1951, Ph.D. 1955) – "Death of God" theologian
- Jonathan Butler (Ph.D. 1975) – historian of religion, lecturer for the Seventh-day Adventist Church
- Frederick William Danker (Ph.D.) – New Testament lexicographer, editor of Bauer's Lexicon, professor at Concordia Seminary, Seminex, and Lutheran School of Theology at Chicago
- Mary Ann Glendon (A.B. 1959, J.D. 1961, L.L.M. 1963) – president of the Pontifical Academy of Social Sciences (highest-ranking female advisor to the Pope); Learned Hand Professor of Law, Harvard Law School; member of the President's Council on Bioethics
- Andrew Greeley (A.M. 1961, Ph.D. 1962) – senior study director at the National Opinion Research Center; Roman Catholic priest; sociologist; best-selling novelist
- Vincent Harding (A.M. 1956, Ph.D. 1965) – pastor and writer about religion
- Don Wendell Holter (Ph.D. 1934) – professor of Church History and Missions at Garrett Theological Seminary; founding president of Saint Paul School of Theology; Bishop of the United Methodist Church
- Raymond A. Joseph (M.A. 1963) – made first translation of the New Testament and Psalms of the Bible into Haitian Creole under the auspices of the American Bible Society (1960)
- Felix A. Levy (Ph.D. 1917) – rabbi of Emanuel Congregation
- Jeffery D. Long (A.M. 1993, PhD 2000) – Hindu expert and author of A Vision for Hinduism: Beyond Hindu Nationalism
- Martin Marty (Ph.D. 1956) – National Humanities Medal (1997); national figure in non-sectarian religious studies
- Lena B. Mathes (Ph.B. 1911, A.M. 1912, B.D. 1914) – educator, social reformer, ordained Baptist minister
- John Warwick Montgomery (Ph.D. 1962) – lawyer, theologian and academic known for his work in the field of Christian apologetics
- Dallin H. Oaks (J.D. 1957) – apostle; president of The Church of Jesus Christ of Latter-day Saints (LDS Church)
- Mordecai Waxman (A.B. 1937) – rabbi in American Jewish Conservative movement, responsible for opening dialogue between American Jews and Pope John Paul II in 1987

== Science and technology ==
- Robert McCormick Adams (Ph.B. 1947, A.M. 1952, Ph.D. 1956) – archeologist, secretary emeritus of the Smithsonian Institution
- Warder Clyde Allee (S.M. 1910, Ph.D. 1912) – zoologist and ecologist
- Abhay Ashtekar (Ph.D. 1974) – pioneer in the field of loop quantum gravity
- Zonia Baber – geographer and geologist
- John N. Bahcall (S.M. 1957) – known for contributions to solar neutrino problem and development of the Hubble Space Telescope, and development of Institute for Advanced Study in Princeton
- J Harlen Bretz (Ph.D. 1913) – geologist, Penrose Medal 1979
- Ralph Buchsbaum (Ph.D. 1938) – invertebrate zoologist
- Facundo Bueso Sanllehí (M.S. 1929) – Guggenheim Fellow, physicist and educator
- Mihir Chowdhury (post doc 1962–64) – physical chemist, Shanti Swarup Bhatnagar laureate
- George Cowan (Ph.D. 1940) – scientist of the Manhattan Project, founder of the Santa Fe Institute
- Harmon Craig (Ph.D. 1951) – winner of Balzan Prize, the first in geochemistry; pioneer in Earth sciences
- Norman Davidson (B.S. 1937, Ph.D. 1941) – Caltech molecular biology professor, received a National Medal of Science
- Frank Edwin Egler (S.B. 1932) – plant ecologist, winner of a Guggenheim Fellowship in 1955
- Larry Ellison (dropped out) – co-founder and CEO of Oracle Corporation, a major database software company
- Harvey Fletcher (Ph.D. 1911) – collaborator with Robert Millikan on the Nobel Prize-winning experiment on the charge of an electron; father of stereophonic sound
- Robert Floyd (A.B. 1953, S.B. 1958) – computer scientist, Turing Award winner
- T. Theodore Fujita (S.B. 1953) – meteorologist, developed the Fujita scale for measuring tornadoes
- Richard Garwin (Ph.D. 1949) – physicist, author of first hydrogen bomb design, recipient of Presidential Medal of Freedom
- Greg Gbur – author and physicist who studies classical coherence theory in optical physics
- Piara Singh Gill (Ph.D. 1940) – physicist, pioneer in cosmic ray nuclear physics
- Mack Gipson Jr. (S.M. 1961, Ph.D. 1963) – first African-American to obtain a Ph.D. in Geology; founding advisor of the NABGG in 1981; consultant to NASA
- Richard Gordon (BSc Mathematics 1963) – adapted Kaczmarz method to create the Algebraic Reconstruction Technique
- John M. Grunsfeld – physicist and NASA astronaut
- Gu Yidong (Ph.D. Organic Chemistry 1935) – chemist and one of the founders of inorganic chemistry in China
- Mary Hefferan (Ph.D. Zoology 1903) – bacteriologist
- Irene Herlocker-Meyer, chemist and environmental activist
- Caroline Herzenberg (S.M. 1955, Ph.D. 1958) – physicist
- Seymour L. Hess (Ph.D. 1950) – meteorologist and planetary scientist who designed the weather instruments for the Viking 1
- Edwin Hubble (S.B. 1910, Ph.D. 1917) – astronomer who found the first evidence for the Big Bang theory
- Christina Hulbe (Ph.D. 1998) – Antarctic researcher, geophysicist, glaciologist
- J. Allen Hynek (B.S. 1931, Ph.D. 1935) – astronomer, professor, and ufologist known for developing the close encounter classification system of UFO experiences
- Deborah S. Jin (Ph.D. 1995) – physicist; MacArthur Fellow in 2003
- Donald Johanson (A.M. 1970, Ph.D. 1974) – paleoanthropologist who discovered "Lucy", a link between primates and humans
- Jason Jones (X. 1997) – co-founder of Bungie, the company behind Halo and Destiny
- Ernest Everett Just (Ph.D. 1916) – zoologist, biologist, physiologist, and research scientist
- Reatha Clark King (Ph.D. 1963) – research chemist whose work in flame fluorine calorimetry contributed to NASA's successful Apollo 11 Moon landing
- Vern Oliver Knudsen (Ph.D. 1922) – co-founder of the Acoustical Society of America; Chancellor of UCLA from 1959 to 1960
- Robert Kowalski – computer scientist in field of logic programming
- Philip S. Low (B.Sc. 1996) – Canadian inventor, computational neuroscientist, and mathematician
- Sara Branham Matthews – microbiologist
- Stanley Miller (Ph.D. 1954) – performed classic Miller–Urey experiment on origin of life in collaboration with Harold Urey in 1953
- J. Howard Moore (A.B. 1898) – zoologist, philosopher, educator and socialist who was an early advocate for animal rights based on Darwinian principles of shared evolutionary kinship
- William Wilson Morgan (S.B. 1927, Ph.D. 1931) – astronomer who co-developed MK system for classification of stars, as well as classification systems for galaxies and clusters; director of Yerkes Observatory
- Stuart Newman (Ph.D., 1970) – developmental and evolutionary biologist
- Donald Osterbrock (A.B., Ph.D.) – astrophysicist known for his contributions to the body of knowledge on interstellar matter, gaseous nebulae, and the nuclei of active galaxies; president of American Astronomical Society; director of Lick Observatory
- Clair Cameron Patterson (Ph.D. 1951) – geochemist accurately determined the age of the Earth and discovered significant lead contamination of the environment
- Nikhil Mohan Pattnaik – scholar, scientist, and science author
- Jeannette Piccard (S.M. 1919) – Balloon aeronaut, speaker for NASA, teacher, scientist and Episcopal priest
- Edith Abigail Purer (M.S. 1921) – botanist
- Ida Kraus Ragins (B.A. 1918, M.S. 1919) – biochemist
- Nancy Grace Roman (Ph.D. 1949) – astronomer, NASA's Chief of Astronomy, planning of the Hubble Space Telescope
- Meyer Rubin (S.B. 1947, S.M. 1949, Ph.D. 1956) – geologist
- Carl Sagan (A.B. 1954, S.B. 1955, S.M. 1956, Ph.D. 1960) – astronomer, author of Contact; Pulitzer Prize winner
- Gerald Scherba (B.S. 1950, M.S. 1952, Ph.D. 1955) – biologist
- John T. Scopes (X. 1931) – proponent of Charles Darwin's theory of evolution that led to the Scopes Trial and the inspiration for the play and film Inherit the Wind
- Nadrian Seeman (S.B. 1966) – physicist, Kavli Prize laureate, inventor of DNA nanotechnology
- Alex Seropian (S.B. 1991) – co-founder of Bungie, the company behind Halo and Destiny
- Herbert A. Simon (A.B. 1936, Ph.D. 1943) – computer scientist, Turing Award winner; economist, Nobel Prize winner
- Joanne Simpson (Ph.D. 1949) – meteorologist
- Pierre Sokolsky (B.A. 1967) – astrophysicist, Panofsky Prize Laureate, directed the HiRES Cosmic Ray Detector project and pioneer in ultra-high-energy cosmic ray physics
- Eugene Stevens (Ph.D. 1965) – known for research in biodegradable plastics
- Otto Struve (Ph.D. 1923) – astronomer, fellow of the Royal Society
- David Suzuki (Ph.D. 1961) – chair of the David Suzuki Foundation; award-winning scientist, environmentalist and broadcaster
- Moddie Taylor (Ph.D. 1943) – chemist, known for contribution to the Manhattan Project while working in the Metallurgical Laboratory
- Richard Thieme (M.A., 1967) – priest, technology consultant, author
- Anthony M. Trozzolo (M.S. 1957, Ph.D. 1960) – chemist
- Alvin M. Weinberg (B.S. 1935, M.S. 1936, Ph.D. 1939) – nuclear physicist, administrator at Oak Ridge National Laboratory during and after the Manhattan Project
- George Wetherill (Ph.B. 1948, S.M. 1949, S.M. 1951, Ph.D. 1953) – National Medal of Science winner, known for seminal work on formation of planets and solar system
- J. Ernest Wilkins Jr. (B.S. 1940) – nuclear scientist, mechanical engineer, and mathematician known for contribution to the Manhattan Project
- Ruby K. Worner (B.S, M.S, Ph.D 1925) – chemist and textiles expert, Fulbright scholar to Alexandria University

== Sports ==
- Jay Berwanger (A.B. 1936) – first Heisman Trophy winner
- Gene Clapp (M.B.A. 1974) – Olympic silver medalist, men's eight rowing
- Willie D. Davis (M.B.A. 1968) – professional football player and former university trustee
- John Jayne (A.B. 2019) – Olympic judoka, Paris 2024
- Kim Ng (A.B. 1990) – general manager of Miami Marlins, former senior vice president of operations with Major League Baseball, former assistant general manager of Los Angeles Dodgers
- Craig Robinson (M.B.A. 1992) – former men's basketball head coach at Oregon State University; older brother of Michelle Obama
- Milton "Mitt" Romney – football player for Chicago Bears; college basketball coach; cousin of former Michigan governor George W. Romney
- Adam Silver (J.D. 1988) – commissioner of the National Basketball Association

== Other ==
- Stanton Friedman (S.B. 1955, S.M. 1956) – nuclear physicist, UFOlogist

== Fictional ==
- Sally Albright and Harry Burns, portrayed by Meg Ryan and Billy Crystal, in the film When Harry Met Sally...
- Dr. Henry Walton "Indiana" Jones Jr., archaeologist and adventurer portrayed by Harrison Ford in the Indiana Jones film series
- Dr. Richard Kimble, MD, vascular surgeon wrongly convicted of his wife's murder, portrayed by Harrison Ford in the film The Fugitive
- Drixenol "Drix" Koldreliff, a stoic cold pill in the movie Osmosis Jones, played by David Hyde Pierce
- Kitty Pryde, member of the superhero group the X-Men
- Dr. Mark Taylor, ER director in the TV series Code Black
- Mark Watney, astronaut and titular main character in the novel The Martian, portrayed by Matt Damon in the film adaptation
