= Ragins =

Ragins is a surname. Notable people with the surname include:

- Ida Kraus Ragins (1894–1985), Russian-born American biochemist
- Mark Ragins, American psychiatrist
