= Van Cauter =

Van Cauter is a surname. Notable people with the surname include:

- Carina Van Cauter (born 1962), Belgian politician
- Emiel Van Cauter (1931–1975), Belgian cyclist
- Eve van Cauter, American endocrinologist
- Gustaaf Van Cauter (born 1948), Belgian cyclist
- Stijn Van Cauter, Belgian musician and music producer
