= David Medina =

David Medina may refer to:

- David M. Medina (born 1958), justice of the Texas Supreme Court
- David Medina (footballer), Spanish footballer
- David Medina, co-founder of Results for America
- David Medina (political advisor), chief of staff for Michelle Obama
