= David Medina (political advisor) =

American political advisor (born 1969/1970)

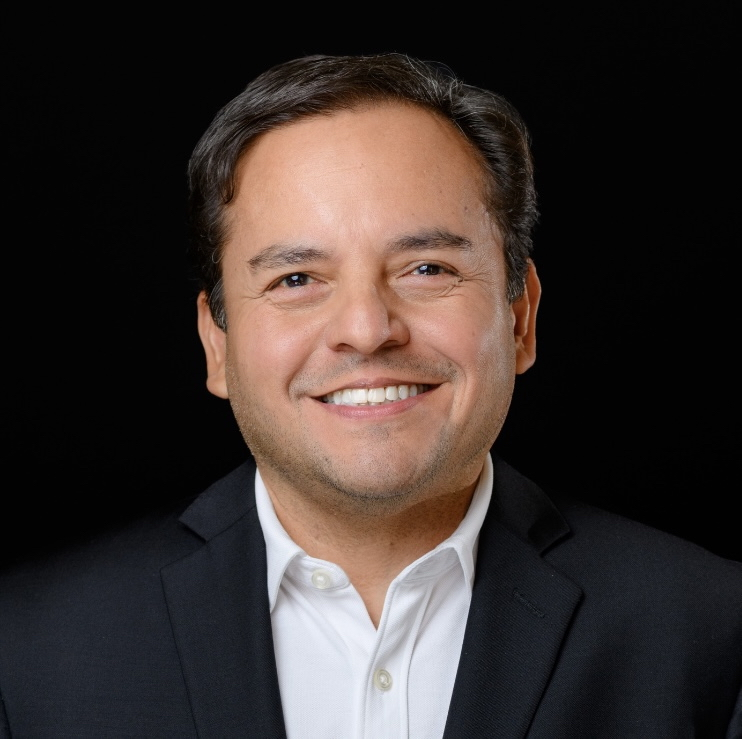
- David Medina in 2025
- Born: 1969 or 1970 (age 56–57); Chicago, Illinois, United States
- Education: University of Chicago; Harvard Kennedy School
- Occupations: Co-founder and COO of Results for America
- Employers: AFL-CIO; Democratic National Committee; U.S. Global Leadership Campaign; Peace Corps
- Board member of: Millennium March on Washington; Congressional Hispanic Caucus Institute; Human Rights Campaign
- Website: greatestloves.com

David Medina is an American political and policy advisor who served as deputy chief of staff for Michelle Obama after being the national political director for John Edwards's 2008 presidential campaign. He has also worked for the Democratic National Committee, the AFL-CIO, the 2004 Democratic National Convention, the U.S. Global Leadership Campaign, and the Peace Corps.

Medina has been a board member of the Millennium March on Washington, the Congressional Hispanic Caucus Institute, the Human Rights Campaign, and the National Academy of Public Administration.

== Early life and education ==
David Medina was born, raised and educated in Chicago. He earned a Bachelor of Arts degree from the University of Chicago in 1991 and a Master's degree in public policy from Harvard Kennedy School in 1993.

== Career and board service ==
Early in his career, he was a legislative assistant for Carol Moseley Braun, the policy director for the Democratic National Committee, a legislative representative for the AFL-CIO from 1998 to 2003, and the deputy chief executive officer for the 2004 Democratic National Convention. He advocated for domestic partnership benefits for Democratic National Committee employees. His work at the AFL-CIO focused on tax, appropriations, budget, campaign finance reform, civil rights, and electoral reform issues.

Between 2005 and 2008, Medina was the national political director for John Edwards's 2008 presidential campaign. He was appointed the director of government relations at the U.S. Global Leadership Campaign in 2008. Medina was the deputy chief of staff for Michelle Obama from January to October 2009. He became the director of the Office of Public Engagement at Peace Corps in late 2009. In 2012, he co-founded and continues to serve as the chief operating officer for Results for America.

Medina served on the board of directors for the Millennium March on Washington (2000), having previously attended the March on Washington for Lesbian, Gay and Bi Equal Rights and Liberation in 1993. He has also been a board member of the Congressional Hispanic Caucus Institute, the Human Rights Campaign, Midwest Academy, the Working America Education Fund, and the National Academy of Public Administration.

In 2025, Medina published Shakespeare's Greatest Love, a non-fiction book about the relationship between William Shakespeare and Henry Wriothesley, 3rd Earl of Southampton, who Medina argues was Shakespeare's greatest love. Broadway Direct's reviewer said "... certainly more entertaining than Jodi Picoult's novel By Any Other Name. ... Medina's work is a fine addition to the vast library of books by Shakespearean amateurs challenging the lazy assumptions of scholars."

== Personal life ==
Medina, who is Hispanic and openly gay and his husband Tim DeMagistris were married at Arena Stage in Washington, D.C., in 2013.

== See also ==
- Hispanics and Latinos in Washington, D.C.
- List of Harvard University people
- List of Hispanic and Latino Americans
- List of University of Chicago alumni
- Sexuality of William Shakespeare

== Publications ==
- Jolin, Michele; Medina, David (August 11, 2020). "How Philanthropy Can Help Governments Accelerate a Real Recovery". Stanford Social Innovation Review. ISSN 1542-7099.
- Medina, David (2025). Shakespeare's Greatest Love. Disruption Books. ISBN 978-1-63331-100-8.
