= Bruce M. King =

American psychologist

Bruce M. King (born July 12, 1946) is an American psychologist and educator known for his work in biopsychology, feeding behavior, body weight regulation, and human sexuality. He is Professor Emeritus in the Department of Psychology at Clemson University and also holds emeritus status from the University of New Orleans. His research has focused on hypothalamic regulation of feeding, obesity, endocrine influences on body weight, and sexuality education. King is also widely recognized for his long-running textbook Human Sexuality Today, which became a widely used text in undergraduate psychology and sexuality studies courses.

== Biography ==
King earned his Bachelor of Arts in Psychology from the UCLA in 1969. He later studied psychology at California State University, Los Angeles before completing his Ph.D. in Biopsychology at the University of Chicago in 1978. His doctoral training established the foundation for his later work in behavioral neuroscience, particularly in the study of hypothalamic mechanisms involved in feeding behavior and obesity.

== Career ==
King began his faculty career at the University of New Orleans in 1978 as Visiting Assistant Professor of Psychology. He became Assistant Professor in 1979, Associate Professor in 1982, and Professor of Psychology in 1988. From 1996 to 2007, he also held the honorary title of Research Professor of Psychology. During his tenure at UNO, he served in several leadership roles, including Chair of the University Policy Committee, Associate Chair of the Department of Psychology, Undergraduate Coordinator, Chair of the Leadership Team for SACS Accreditation, and Coordinator of University Institutional Effectiveness.

In 2007, King joined Clemson University as Professor in the Department of Psychology and served as department chair from 2007 to 2009. He continued teaching and research there until his retirement in December 2021, after which he was named Professor Emeritus at both Clemson and the University of New Orleans. He was particularly recognized for undergraduate teaching, and Clemson students notably voted Psychology 306 the best course on campus and named him the best instructor in the College of Business and Behavioral Sciences in 2012.

== Research and scholarly works ==
King’s research centers primarily on feeding behavior, hypothalamic obesity, body weight regulation, and the neuroendocrine mechanisms underlying appetite and metabolism. Much of his early and highly cited work examined lesions of the ventromedial hypothalamus (VMH) in rats and their relationship to hyperphagia, obesity, insulin regulation, and glucocorticoid activity. His studies helped clarify the roles of vagally mediated hyperinsulinemia, corticosterone, and hypothalamic damage in obesity development, contributing significantly to behavioral neuroscience and physiological psychology.

In addition to laboratory research, King developed an extensive body of scholarship in human sexuality and sexuality education. His textbook Human Sexuality Today, first published in 1991 and revised through multiple editions—including the 10th edition in 2024 with Pamela C. Regan—became one of the most widely used sexuality textbooks in the United States. He also co-authored Statistical Reasoning in the Behavioral Sciences, a major instructional text in psychological statistics that went through multiple editions and international adaptations, including a Polish translation and an Indian edition.

== Selected publications ==
- King, Bruce M. (1980). "A re-examination of the ventromedial hypothalamic paradox". Neuroscience & Biobehavioral Reviews. 4 (2): 151–160. doi:10.1016/0149-7634(80)90013-5. ISSN 0149-7634.
- King, Bruce M. (1988). "Glucocorticoids and hypothalamic obesity". Neuroscience & Biobehavioral Reviews. 12 (1): 29–37. doi:10.1016/s0149-7634(88)80071-x. ISSN 0149-7634.
- Regan, Pamela; King, Bruce M. (2024). Human sexuality today (10 ed.). Hoboken: Pearson Education. ISBN 978-0-13-806521-8.
- "Statistical Reasoning in the Behavioral Sciences, 7th Edition | Wiley". Wiley.com.
- King, Bruce M. (2006). "The rise, fall, and resurrection of the ventromedial hypothalamus in the regulation of feeding behavior and body weight". Physiology & Behavior. 87 (2): 221–244. doi:10.1016/j.physbeh.2005.10.007.
- King, Bruce M. (2013). "The modern obesity epidemic, ancestral hunter-gatherers, and the sensory/reward control of food intake". American Psychologist. 68 (2): 88–96. doi:10.1037/a0030684. ISSN 1935-990X.
- King, Bruce M. (2022). "The Influence of Social Desirability on Sexual Behavior Surveys: A Review". Archives of Sexual Behavior. 51 (3): 1495–1501. doi:10.1007/s10508-021-02197-0. ISSN 0004-0002. PMC 8917098. PMID 35142972.

== Awards and honors ==
He is a Fellow of the Association for Psychological Science, the American Psychological Association, and the International Behavioral Neuroscience Society. He was awarded the honorary title of University Research Professor at the University of New Orleans and received Clemson University’s Research, Scholarship, and Artistic Achievement Award as part of its inaugural class.

For teaching excellence, he was named a Seraphia D. Leyda University Teaching Fellow at UNO and received the UNO Alumni Association Excellence in Teaching Award. Additional honors include honorary membership in the Golden Key National Honor Society, the Outstanding Achievement Award from the Louisiana Task Force for Gay and Lesbian Youth, and public recognition for his teaching in the New Orleans Times-Picayune.
