= Changhong Zhu =

Chinese official

- Education: University of Chicago
- Occupation: former CIO of State Administration of Foreign Exchange

Zhu Changhong is the former CIO of China's State Administration of Foreign Exchange. Previously, he worked at PIMCO from 2006 to February 2009. Despite managing China's US$3.5 trillion foreign currency reserves, he was known as the "Invisible Man" due to his extremely low profile.

== Early life and education ==
Zhu is the oldest of two sons born to an intellectual and his wife. When asked if his father had suffered any backlash in the Cultural Revolution, Zhu responded that “He was re-educated and then he was fine.” Zhu graduated from the University of Chicago with a PhD in physics before starting his investment career. His thesis adviser at UChicago commented on Zhu's entrepreneurial drive and work ethic as he finished his dissertation in two years, half the usual time.

== Career ==
After graduating, Zhu was recruited to work in the Investment Portfolio of Bank of America's Treasury in San Francisco. He became a part of the off-balance sheet portfolio and traded Interest Rate Options to manage Bank of America's interest rate risk. After the merger of Bank of America and Nationsbank, the executives in Charlotte, NC made it clear that the work Zhu and the other traders had done was too complicated and high tech. Zhu then went to work at PIMCO where he worked as the right-hand man of bond investor Bill H. Gross. In late 2009, he left his high-paying job at PIMCO along with two luxury mansions in Las Vegas and California to return to his country and work for China's State Administration of Foreign Exchange, a move seen as patriotic and lauded by high-ranking Chinese officials.

As the Chief Investment Officer of China's State Administration of Foreign Exchange and its US$3.5 trillion in foreign reserves, Zhu became "one of the most powerful investors in the world." Under Zhu's leadership, SAFE lowered its holdings of US bonds from 45% to around 35% and focused on boosting investments in Japanese equities, European debt, U.S. corporate bonds and equities. During Zhu's tenure, SAFE's foreign-exchange reserves saw a rise of 59% in total value at US$3.82 trillion at the end of 2013 from the US$2.40 trillion before his arrival.

In 2014, Zhu abruptly resigned from his post in SAFE. Peng Junming, a former SAFE official, was quoted as saying “Zhu’s departure is a big loss to SAFE, and to China.”
