= Emmett Rensin =

American essayist and political commentator (born 1990)

Emmett Rensin (born January 20, 1990) is an American essayist and political commentator who writes from a leftist perspective. Originally from Los Angeles, he currently serves as a contributing editor for the Los Angeles Review of Books. In 2012, he was a founding member of Chicago's First Floor Theater, which won the Chicago Reader's Best of 2013 Poll for "Best New Theater Company".

He is the author of the book, The Complications: On Going Insane in America, published by HarperOne in 2024.

== Twitterature (2009) ==
Twitterature: The World's Greatest Books Retold Through Twitter, coauthored with Alexander Aciman, was published in 2009, when both authors were 19-year-old undergraduates. The book comprises summaries of around 50 well-known literary texts (including William Shakespeare's King Lear, Johann Wolfgang von Goethe's The Sorrows of Young Werther and Jack Kerouac's On the Road) in the form of series of Twitter posts.

== Trump tweets controversy ==
In June 2016, Vox, which employed Rensin as an editor and occasional feature writer, suspended him for a series of tweets calling for anti-Trump riots, including one on June 3 that urged, "If Trump comes to your town, start a riot."
