= Hypothalamic disease =

- Specialty: Neurology, endocrinology

Hypothalamic disease is a disorder presenting primarily in the hypothalamus, which may be caused by damage resulting from malnutrition, including anorexia and bulimia eating disorders, genetic disorders, radiation, surgery, head trauma, lesion, tumour or other physical injury to the hypothalamus. The hypothalamus is the control center for several endocrine functions. Endocrine systems controlled by the hypothalamus are regulated by antidiuretic hormone (ADH), corticotropin-releasing hormone, gonadotropin-releasing hormone, growth hormone-releasing hormone, oxytocin, all of which are secreted by the hypothalamus. Damage to the hypothalamus may impact any of these hormones and the related endocrine systems. Many of these hypothalamic hormones act on the pituitary gland. Hypothalamic disease therefore affects the functioning of the pituitary and the target organs controlled by the pituitary, including the adrenal glands, ovaries and testes, and the thyroid gland.

Numerous dysfunctions manifest as a result of hypothalamic disease. Damage to the hypothalamus may cause disruptions in body temperature regulation, growth, weight, sodium and water balance, milk production, emotions, and sleep cycles. Hypopituitarism, neurogenic diabetes insipidus, tertiary hypothyroidism, and developmental disorders are examples of precipitating conditions caused by hypothalamic disease.

== Hypopituitarism ==
The hypothalamus and pituitary gland are tightly integrated. Damage to the hypothalamus will impact the responsiveness and normal functioning of the pituitary. Hypothalamic disease may cause insufficient or inhibited signalling to the pituitary leading to deficiencies of one or more of the following hormones: thyroid-stimulating hormone, adrenocorticotropic hormone, beta-endorphin, luteinizing hormone, follicle-stimulating hormone, and melanocyte–stimulating hormones. Treatment for hypopituitarism involves hormone replacement therapy.

== Neurogenic diabetes insipidus ==
Neurogenic diabetes insipidus may occur due to low levels of ADH production from the hypothalamus. Insufficient levels of ADH result in increased thirst and urine output, and prolonged excessive urine excretion increases the risk of dehydration.

== Tertiary hypothyroidism ==
The thyroid gland is an auxiliary organ to the hypothalamus-pituitary system. Thyrotropin-releasing hormone (TRH) produced by the hypothalamus signals to the pituitary to release thyroid-stimulating hormone (TSH), which then stimulates the thyroid to secrete T_{4} and T_{3} thyroid hormones. Secondary hypothyroidism occurs when TSH secretion from the pituitary is impaired, whereas tertiary hypothyroidism is the deficiency or inhibition of TRH.

Thyroid hormones are responsible for metabolic activity. Insufficient production of the thyroid hormones result in suppressed metabolic activity and weight gain. Hypothalamic disease may therefore have implications for obesity.

== Developmental disorders ==
Growth hormone-releasing hormone (GHRH) is another releasing factor secreted by the hypothalamus. GHRH stimulates the pituitary gland to secrete growth hormone (GH), which has various effects on body growth and sexual development. Insufficient GH production may cause poor somatic growth, precocious puberty or gonadotropin deficiency, failure to initiate or complete puberty, and is often associated with rapid weight gain, low T_{4}, and low levels of sex hormones.

== Sleep disorders ==
Non-24-hour sleep-wake syndrome, a disabling condition in which one's sleep/wake cycle is longer, or rarely, shorter, than the standard 24 hours, is thought to involve or be caused by, at least in some cases, an abnormal functioning of the suprachiasmatic nucleus (SCN) in the hypothalamus.
