= Karen Katen =

American pharmaceutical executive

- Born: 1948 (age 77–78); St. Louis, Missouri, U.S.
- Education: University of Chicago
- Occupation: Pharmaceutical executive

Karen L. Katen (born 1948) is an American pharmaceutical executive who spent most of her career with Pfizer, eventually serving as Vice Chairman of the company and President of its pharmaceuticals division.

== Early life and education ==
Katen was born in St. Louis, Missouri, in 1948. She earned a Bachelor of Arts degree in political science in 1970 and a Master of Business Administration in 1974, both from the University of Chicago.

== Career ==
Katen joined Pfizer in 1974 and steadily rose through the ranks, becoming President of Pfizer Pharmaceuticals in 1995. Under her leadership, Pfizer launched several major products, including Lipitor and Viagra. During this period, Pfizer’s U.S. Pharmaceuticals Group achieved record financial performance each year, with revenues surpassing US$9.2 billion in 1999. Following Pfizer’s acquisition of Warner–Lambert, Katen managed what was then the largest integration in the history of the U.S. pharmaceutical industry.

In the early 2000s, Katen was considered one of three Vice Chairmen likely to succeed CEO Henry "Hank" McKinnell Jr. upon his retirement. However, in 2006, Jeffrey Kindler was appointed CEO, and Katen subsequently left the company.

Since leaving Pfizer, Katen has served on multiple boards of directors, including those of The Home Depot, Air Liquide, and Takeda Pharmaceutical Company. She has also been involved with several charitable organizations.

== Awards and recognition ==
- 2003 – Ranked sixth on Fortune magazine’s list of the "50 Most Powerful Women in Business"
- 2002 – Named among the "25 Top Executives" by BusinessWeek
- 1990 – Inaugural Healthcare Businesswomen's Association "Woman of the Year"
