= David B. Eskind =

- Born: 1909; Nashville, Tennessee, U.S.
- Died: August 23, 1992 (aged 82–83); Washington, D.C., U.S.
- Education: University of Chicago
- Occupations: Radio scriptwriter and producer

David B. Eskind (1909–1992) was a radio scriptwriter and producer for the United States Army.

== Early life ==
Eskind was born in Nashville, Tennessee, in 1909. His parents owned theatres in Nashville, and he grew up playing the saxophone. He graduated from the University of Chicago in 1934, where he studied writing with Thornton Wilder.

== Career ==
Eskind wrote radio scripts for Author's Playhouse on NBC and The Buddy Clark Treat Time Show on CBS.

During World War II, he joined the United States Army and worked as a writer-producer of Army radio programs in education and information in the Pacific.

By the end of the war, he was hired by the Armed Forces Radio Service in Washington, D.C., and he became a civilian writer-producer of radio shows. In 1953, he was chief writer of the “Army Hour,” a program broadcast on the Mutual Broadcasting Network, which he also produced.

== Death ==
Eskind died of cancer on August 23, 1992, in Washington, D.C.
