= Eugene Stevens =

American chemist (1938–2024)

Eugene S. (E. S.) Stevens (born Eugene S. Pysh; 29 December 1938 – 16 December 2024) was a Professor of Physical Chemistry at Binghamton University. He was best known for his research in biodegradable plastics. He was a quoted expert in articles published in the New York Times, Bloomberg Businessweek, and the International Herald Tribune.

== Education ==
Stevens received a Bachelor of Science degree in Chemistry from Yale University and his doctorate in Chemistry from the University of Chicago. Funded by a National Science Foundation Fellowship, he completed his postdoctoral work at Harvard University.

== Career ==
Stevens conducted research in the area of biopolymers for over 30 years. He was the author of ‘’Green Plastics: An Introduction to the New Science of Biodegradable Plastics’’ (Princeton University Press, 2002), the first general audience book about the research and development of biodegradable plastics made from plants. In 2012, the book inspired the invention of an edible LED lamp.

Stevens' research involved the use of abundant, renewable biopolymer resources, specifically polysaccharides—including starch, cellulose, and agar—for the production of degradable, biodegradable, and compostable products that conserve the use of fossil resources and divert waste plastics from landfills and incinerators. His research was supported by grants from funders such as the National Science Foundation.

His early career focused on studying the conformational behavior of biomolecules, a topic he explored through chiroptic methods.

Stevens joined the faculty of Binghamton University in 1977. In 2011, he received the Chancellor’s Award for Excellence in Faculty Service.

Stevens served as a speaker for the American Chemical Society, reaching students and general audiences throughout the U.S.

== Publications ==
In addition to his book, Stevens wrote numerous articles that appeared in publications such as the Journal of Chemical Education and the Journal of Biobased Materials and Bioenergy. He was also quoted in BusinessWeek regarding biotechnology advances.

== Memberships ==
Stevens was a member of the American Chemical Society and the American Society for Testing and Materials.

== Death ==
Stevens died 16 December 2024 in Binghamton, New York.
