= Vivian Tu =

American influencer

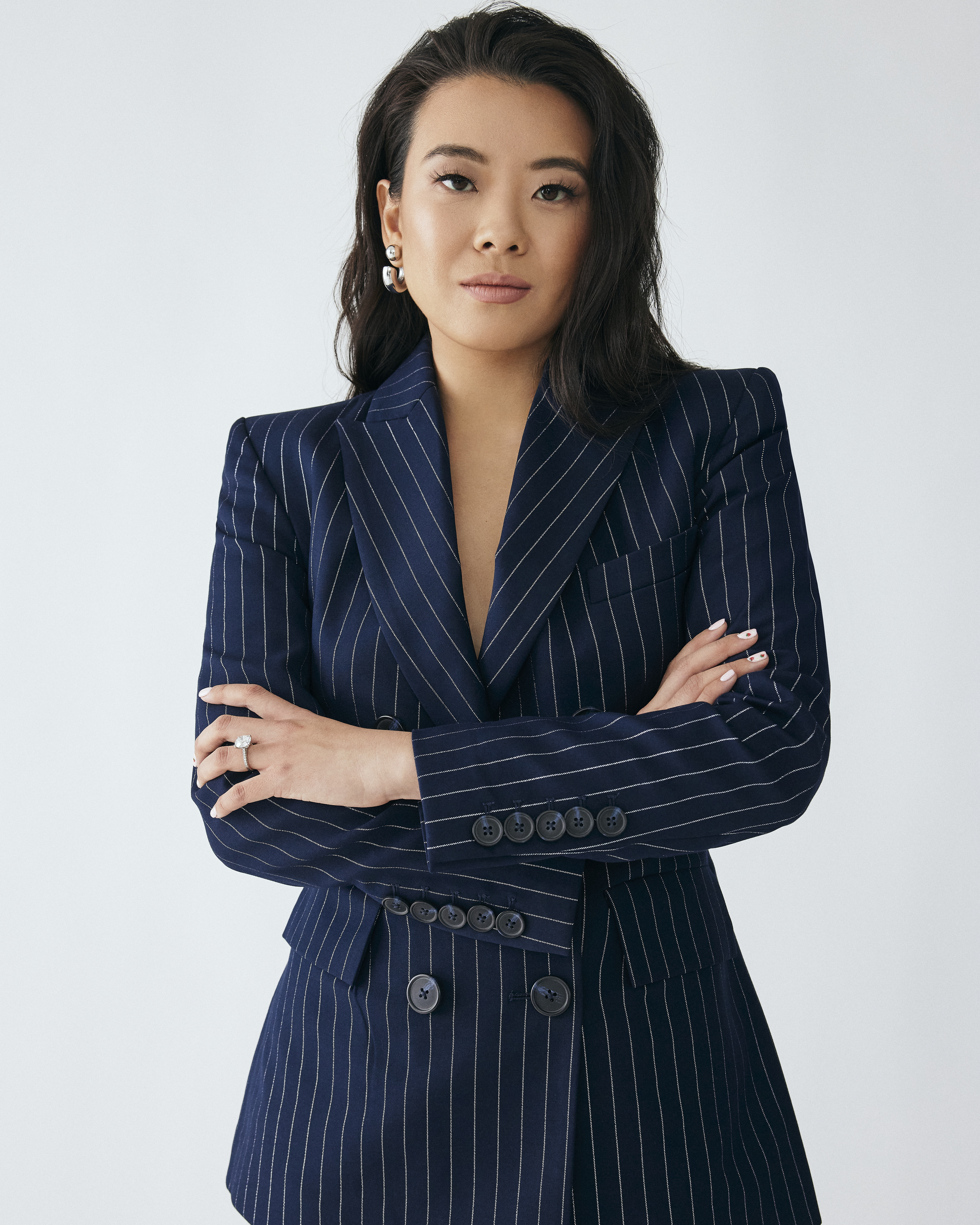
- Born: March 20, 1994 (age 32); Baltimore, Maryland, US
- Education: University of Chicago
- Occupations: Business Woman, author, and media personality
- Title: CEO & Founder of Your Rich BFF
- Spouse: Greg Hunt (m. 2024)

Instagram information
- Page: your.richbff

TikTok information
- Page: yourrichbff
- Website: https://yourrichbff.com/

Vivian Tu (also known as Your Rich BFF) is an American businesswoman, author, and media personality. She is the founder and CEO of Your Rich BFF, a multi-media company that provides financial education.

== Early life and education ==
Tu was born in Baltimore, Maryland as the only child to Chinese immigrant parents. Her mother worked in chemistry and consulting, and her father was a computer programmer at NASA’s Goddard Space Flight Center. She graduated valedictorian of Marriotts Ridge High School in 2012, was a member of Maryland FBLA,and received her bachelor's degree from the University of Chicago in 2016.

== Career ==
=== 2016-2021: JP Morgan, Buzzfeed ===
Following her graduation from the University of Chicago, Tu started her career as a trader at J.P. Morgan. Tu traded stocks in the industrial, materials, and energy sectors. Tu transitioned into a digital media sales role at BuzzFeed.

=== 2021-present: Your Rich BFF, Networth & Chill, Rich AF ===
Tu started making financial education videos on TikTok in 2021, and left her job at Buzzfeed to become a full-time influencer in 2022. She often covers topics such as saving, investing, and traveling on a budget. Tu has gained a following of 8 million across her platforms, with her largest following on Instagram, as of December, 2024. Tu is represented by William Morris Endeavor since 2022.

In 2023, Tu launched her podcast Networth & Chill, in partnership with Audioboom, to expand upon the financial information she shares on her social platforms. Tu partnered with Vox Media and PS, formerly known as PopSugar, for Season Two of Networth & Chill. On December 26, 2023, Tu released her first book Rich AF: The Winning Money Mindset that Will Change Your Life. It became a New York Times bestseller under both the Business and the Advice, How To & Miscellaneous categories.

== Awards & recognition ==
Since 2021, Tu has been named to the Forbes 30 under 30 and Forbes Top Creators lists. She has also been nominated for a Webby award, and multiple Shorty Awards, including a finalist nomination for Branded Series. In 2023, Tu was a Meta Visionary Voices award winner. In 2024, Tu won Best Personal Finance Influencer presented by Bankrate, and Networth & Chill was nominated for Best Business + Finance podcast at the 2024 iHeart Podcast Awards at SXSW. Her podcast has been nominated for the iHeartRadio Podcast Awards. In January, 2025, Networth & Chill was nominated for the iHeartPodcast Best Business & Finance Award.

== Personal life ==
On June 29, 2024, Tu married Greg Hunt, in Lake Como, Italy.

Tu has been open about using and affording Botox and other cosmetic enhancements on her social media.
