= Richard E. Tracy =

American forensic pathologist and academic

- Education: University of Chicago
- Awards: Received Joseph A. Capps Award in (1965)
- Scientific career
- Workplaces: Louisiana State University
- Website: www.researchgate.net/profile/Richard_Tracy

Richard E. Tracy is an American forensic pathologist and professor emeritus. His research activities have concentrated on atherosclerosis and hypertension.

== Education ==
Tracy is a pathologist in the Louisiana State University Health Sciences Center in New Orleans. He was a graduate in B.A. from the University of Chicago. After his graduation, he joined as freshman-junior years in medical school (1955–1958). During these years he started his research on pathology and acted as USPHS Fellowship Trainee in Pathology. He got his M.D. and Ph.D. in 1961 from the University of Chicago.

== Research and career ==
Tracy started his career as a pathologist and a research fellowship in the Department of Pathology, University of Chicago. He was an instructor in pathology, University of Chicago. At Oregon Health & Science University, he was an assistant professor of pathology and finally became professor emeritus in LSUHSC from 2005. He also worked as a visiting pathologist LSU division, Charity Hospital, New Orleans.

He is a Member of the Veterans Administration Merit Review Board Pathologist to the Coroner of Washington Parish.

== Awards and honors ==
He received the Bausch and Lomb Medal for student research in 1961. He also won the Joseph A. Capps Award. He also has memberships in different associations such as the American Heart Association, Council on arteriosclerosis, International Academy of Pathology, American Society of Investigative Pathology, American Medical Association, and the Louisiana State Medical Society.
