= In the Name of Science =

1966 book by Harold L. Nieburg

In the Name of Science is a book written by Harold L. Nieburg in 1966 concerning the political uses of science. It focuses on American defense spending on science and the U.S. military-industrial complex, and was one of the first books to discuss this issue at length.

A summary appears in the Bulletin of the Atomic Scientists 22 (March 1966), pp. 20–24, as R and D in the Contract State: Throwing Away the Yardstick in a review by Bernard L. Spinrad.
