= Harold L. Nieburg =

American political scientist

Harold Leonard Nieburg (November 1927 – September 27, 2001) was an American political scientist, best known for his influential book on the military-industrial complex, In the Name of Science.

Born in 1927 in Philadelphia, he attended the University of Chicago, earning a Ph. B. (1947), A.M. (1952), and Ph.D. (1960) in political science. He served briefly in the U.S. Air Force during the Korean War, reaching the rank of corporal, and as a reporter for The Philadelphia Inquirer and for the Chicago Sun-Times. Later he taught at Illinois State University, Case Institute of Technology, and the University of Wisconsin–Milwaukee before accepting a position at Binghamton University in 1970. He retired in 1995 to the Ft. Myers, Florida region.

He was considered an international expert on political conflict and the Cold War, and was a confidant of John F. Kennedy, Robert F. Kennedy, and Paul Simon.

He wrote numerous books, including Nuclear Secrecy and Foreign Policy (1964), Political Violence: The Behavioral Process (1969), and Culture Storm: Politics and the Ritual Order (1973). He also wrote hundreds of scholarly articles. His most influential work was In the Name of Science (1966). The book focused on the political uses to which science is put with an emphasis on defense spending on science. Later in his career he focused on political journalism and political polling, and was an early advocate of the use of computers in political science. This last interest eventually led him to write for computer magazines such as Computer Shopper. He was also an amateur photographer.

He died on 27 September 2001 of an aneurysm. He is survived by his wife Janet Nieburg and his four children.
