= Asish Basu =

Indian geologist, academic, and researcher

Asish R. Basu
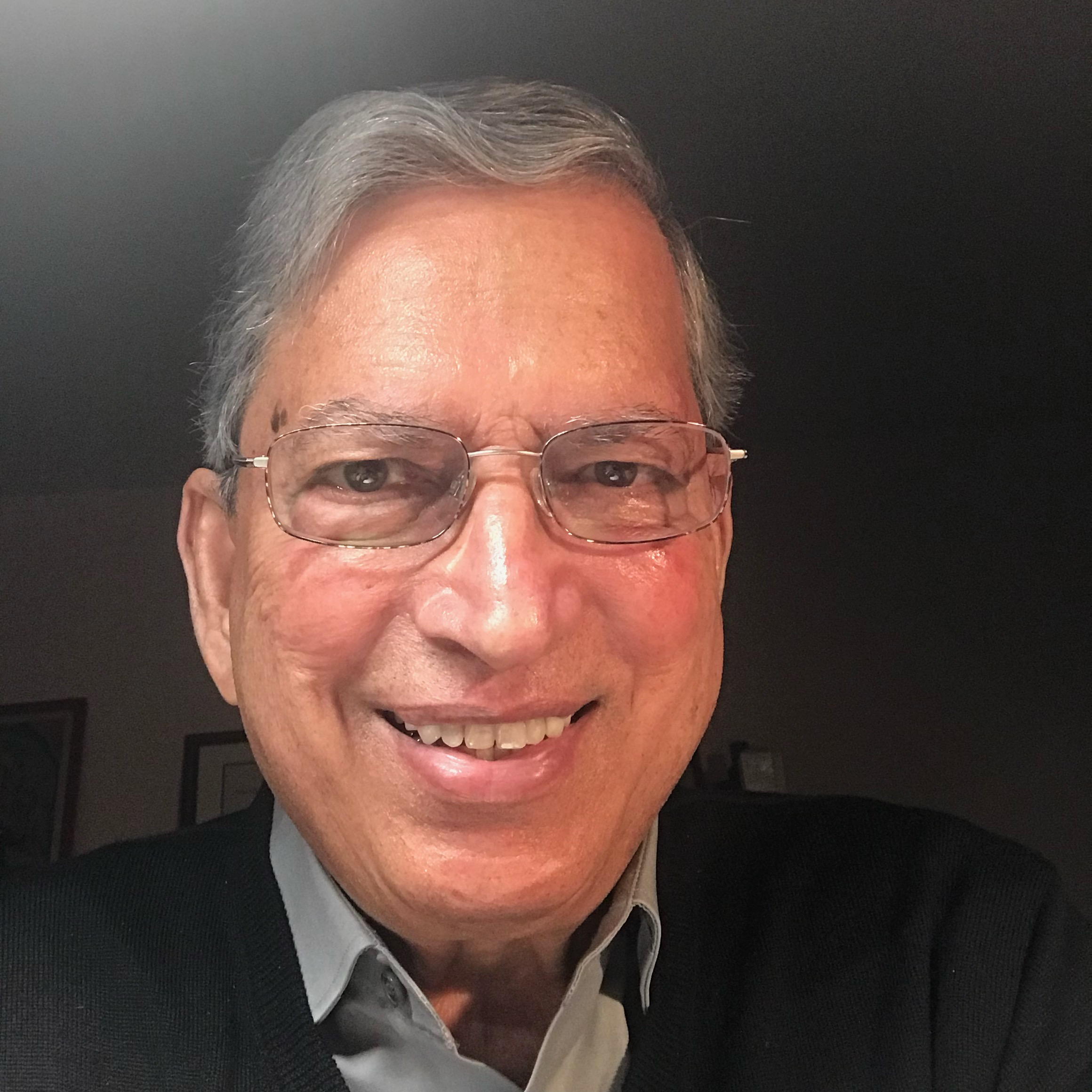
- Occupations: Geologist, academic, and researcher
- Awards: Scholar Awardee 2005, American Federation of Mineralogical Society; Fellow, American Association for the Advancement of Science; Fellow, Geological Society of America

Academic background
- Education: B.Sc., Geology, Physics, Mathematics; M.Sc., Geology; M.S., Geophysical Sciences; Ph.D., Geology
- Alma mater: University of Calcutta; University of Chicago; University of California-Davis

Asish R. Basu is a geologist, academic, and researcher. He is Professor Emeritus of Earth and Environmental Sciences at the University of Texas at Arlington. He is most known for his research in Earth Science -related subjects, such as isotope geochemistry, flood basalt volcanism, and mineralogy-petrology.

Basu has authored over 110 scientific papers in various magazines and journals, including Nature (journal), and the International weekly journal of Science. He is on the editorial board of International Geology Review, and has served as an executive committee member of the Volcanology, Geochemistry and Petrology section of American Geophysical Union for six years. He is a Fellow of the Geological Society of America, and the American Association for the Advancement of Science, a member of the New York Academy of Sciences, and was appointed as a part of the five - member US Delegation to attend the First Symposium on the Qinghai-Tibet Plateau in Beijing, May 1980.

== Early life and education ==
Basu was born in India and educated in Presidency College. He then attended University of Calcutta, from which he received his bachelor's degree in Geology, Physics, and Mathematics in 1963, and a master's degree in geology in 1965. Followed by that, he earned another master's degree in Geophysical Sciences from the University of Chicago in 1969. He holds a Doctoral degree in geology from the University of California-Davis.

== Career ==
Basu started his academic career as an assistant professor of geological sciences at the University of Rochester in 1978. He was promoted to associate professor in 1981, and subsequently became a professor of geological sciences in 1987. After serving in this position for 26 years, he joined the University of Texas at Arlington in 2013 as a professor of earth and environmental sciences. He remained in this position until becoming professor emeritus in 2020.

During this tenure at the University of Rochester, he was appointed as chair in the Department of Earth and Environmental Sciences from 1986 till 1998. Later on, in 2013, he held appointment as chair of earth and environmental sciences at the University of Texas, Arlington. He was an advisor and consultant of the International Atomic Energy Agency in its Isotope hydrology Division in studies of Groundwater Arsenic contamination in Bangladesh and India (West Bengal) and for ground water exploration in Jordan.

== Research ==
=== Mantle structure and meteorite impact ===
Basu has focused his research on mineralogy-petrology, volcanology, mantle petrology and isotope geochemistry, and flood basalt volcanism, mass extinction, as well as meteorite impacts. He did work using Neodymium isotopes in mantle xenoliths and their host volcanic rocks to infer mantle heterogeneity and upper mantle structures. Also, by using Neodymium isotopes he showed a meteorite impact melted crustal rocks to form one of the largest Nickel deposits in Sudbury, Canada. In recognition of his doctoral research in San Quentin, Baja California in Mexico and published during 1974–84, Volcan Basu was named in San Quentin Volcanic Field of Baja California for one of its extinct craters. He has co-edited a volume in 1996 on Earth Processes: Reading the Isotopic Code, published by the American Geophysical Union as Monograph 95.

=== Flood volcanism and mass extinctions ===
Basu has done work on mantle plume volcanism, their rapid eruptions, precise age relationships to two of the major geological boundaries coinciding with mass extinctions, their primitive compositions of deep-seated mantle origin, and their possible relationships to meteorite impacts. He argued that the Permian-Triassic boundary records the most severe mass extinctions in Earth's history. While focusing his research on the relationship that exists between Permian-Triassic boundary Crises and Siberian flood volcanism, he highlighted how volcanogenic sulfate aerosols and the dynamic impacts of the Siberian plume contributed to environmental extrema that consequently resulted in the mass extinctions. Keeping in view that Siberian Traps represent one of the most voluminous flood basalt provinces on Earth, he focused his study on the quick eruption process of the Siberian Traps flood basalts at the Permo-Triassic boundary. He also described the U-Th-Pb, Sm-Nd, and Rb-Sr isotopic systematics of mafic and ultramafic xenolithic rocks and associated megacrystic inclusions of aluminous augite and garnet, that occur in three alkalic volcanic suites: Kuandian in eastern Liaoning Province, Hanluoba in Hebei Province, and Minxi in western Fujian Province, China. The second largest mass extinction in Earth history at the Cretaceous -Paleogene boundary (KPg), nearly 66 million years ago, is another of his major research activities on plume volcanism. His research has shown several relationships between onset of Deccan volcanism in India, its termination, its relationship to K-Pg mass extinction and the major phase of this volcanism, and coincidence in the precise timing of the Cretaceous – Tertiary Chicxulub impact in the Yucatán peninsula in Mexico at 66 Million years ago.

Basu determined multiple trace element concentrations in volcanic glass, dredged from the Mid-Atlantic Ridges, from near the equatorial mid-Atlantic Ocean, characterizing the mid-oceanic ridge basalt source characteristics; he also provided geochemical evidence of Strontium and Neodymium isotopes and several trace element compositions, including the rare earth elements, that during the middle-Tertiary the mid-oceanic ridges collided with western California, while providing an example of a framework for tectonic-geochemical signature to interpret geological records. By discovering in situ diamonds in ultrahigh-pressure peridotite minerals of the Himalayan ophiolite in the Indus Suture Zone, he with colleagues inferred this ophiolite sourced from the Mantle Transition Zone. He and co-workers found meteorite fragments at the Permian-Triassic boundary in Antarctica, a finding that was challenged by several scientists who opined the Siberian Flood Basalts as the sole cause of this P-T extinction, although small impact crater in South America of P-T age is acknowledged, and an end-Permian impact crater offshore of north western Australia has also been proposed.

== Awards and honors ==
- 'Volcan Basu', San Quintín Volcanic Field in Baja California, named in 1995 in recognition of research done on this volcanic field in the 1970s-1980's
- Scholar Awardee 2005, American Federation of Mineralogical Society
- Fellow, American Association for the Advancement of Science
- Fellow, Geological Society of America

== Bibliography ==
=== Books ===
Earth Processes: Reading the Isotopic Code (1996) ISBN 9780875900773

=== Selected articles ===
- Renne, P. R., & Basu, A. R. (1991). Rapid eruption of the Siberian Traps flood basalts at the Permo-Triassic boundary. Science, 253(5016), 176–179.
- Basu, A. R., Junwen, W., Wankang, H., Guanghong, X., & Tatsumoto, M. (1991). Major element, REE, and Pb, Nd and Sr isotopic geochemistry of Cenozoic volcanic rocks of eastern China: implications for their origin from suboceanic-type mantle reservoirs. Earth and Planetary Science Letters, 105(1-3), 149–169.
- Tatsumoto, M., Basu, A. R., Wankang, H., Junwen, W., & Guanghong, X. (1992). Sr, Nd, and Pb isotopes of ultramafic xenoliths in volcanic rocks of Eastern China: enriched components EMI and EMII in subcontinental lithosphere. Earth and Planetary Science Letters, 113(1-2), 107–128.
- Renne, P. R., Black, M. T., Zichao, Z., Richards, M. A., & Basu, A. R. (1995). Synchrony and causal relations between Permian-Triassic boundary crises and Siberian flood volcanism. Science, 269(5229), 1413–1416.
- Basu, A. R., Jacobsen, S. B., Poreda, R. J., Dowling, C. B., & Aggarwal, P. K. (2001). Large groundwater strontium flux to the oceans from the Bengal Basin and the marine strontium isotope record. Science, 293(5534), 1470–1473.
- Dowling, C. B., Poreda, R. J., Basu, A. R., Peters, S. L., & Aggarwal, P. K. (2002). Geochemical study of arsenic release mechanisms in the Bengal Basin groundwater. Water Resources Research, 38(9), 12–1.
- Basu, A., & Hart, S. (1996). Earth Processes: Reading the Isotopic Code: American Geophysical Union Geophysical Monograph Series 95. Washington, D.C.
