= Shiro Tashiro =

Japanese-born American biochemist

Shiro Tashiro or Tashiro Shirosuke (12 February 1883 – 12 June 1963) was an American biochemist of Japanese origin who worked at the University of Cincinnati as a professor of biochemistry. He contributed a technique for the accurate detection of very small amounts of carbon dioxide produced during metabolic activities using barium hydroxide.

Tashiro was born in Kagoshima prefecture and moved to the US in 1901. He studied at the University of Chicago receiving a B.S. (1909) and a Ph.D. (1912). He worked as an associate in physiological chemistry and became an assistant professor in 1918. The next year he moved to the University of Cincinnati and in 1923 he received a medical degree from Kyoto University for work on the metabolism of nerve fibres. This was to be a major tool for studies in animal physiology. Apart from detection of carbon dioxide and ammonia production (with the use of the so-called Tashiro's indicator) he also examined the possibility of assays for acetylcholine. He became a full professor in 1925 and retired in 1952. He received an Osaka Mainichi Prize in 1924.

Tashiro married Shizuka Kawasaki in 1915. A relative Sabro Tashiro also joined the University of Cincinnati where he became a professor of surgery.
