= U.S. Global Leadership Coalition =

Non-profit supporting US diplomacy

- Formation: 1995
- Type: Non-profit organization
- Location: 1129 20th St NW, Suite 600, Washington, D.C. 20036
- Key people: Liz Schrayer; Will Davis
- Website: www.usglc.org
- Formerly called: U.S. Global Leadership Campaign, Center for U.S. Global Leadership

The U.S. Global Leadership Coalition (USGLC) is a nonprofit organization formed by a coalition of American businesses and NGOs, senior national security and foreign policy experts, faith-based and community leaders from across the United States who promote increased support for the United States' diplomatic and development efforts among both politicians and the public.

Based in Washington D.C., the USGLC advocates a higher international affairs budget in order to enhance national security, forward American business interests, and improve humanitarian assistance around the world through political lobbying. The international affairs budget is a component of the U.S. federal budget that funds many U.S. State Department activities and programs, including the U.S. Agency for International Development (USAID), the President's Emergency Plan for AIDS Relief (PEPFAR), the Peace Corps, the World Bank, aid to Israel, international development programs, and many other civilian-led programs abroad (including civilian reconstruction teams and democratic governance projects in Iraq and Afghanistan).

== History ==
The USGLC was established in 1995 by Liz Schrayer when a diverse group of companies, NGOs, and foreign policy experts rallied together in response to congressional funding cuts to the International Affairs Budget. Viewing diplomacy and international development programs as essential to improving national security and creating conditions for business expansion into new and friendly markets, the Coalition sought to engage with Capitol Hill, the White House, and local organizations from across the United States and educate them on the importance of the International Affairs Budget to Americans’ security and prosperity.

In July 2009 the primary focus of the USGLC shifted from advocacy toward education. Reflecting this, the organization's name changed to its current: "U.S. Global Leadership Coalition." The Coalition continues to be involved in 501-c(4) activities, but they comprise a relatively small amount of the overall work done by the organization.

The USGLC has expanded significantly since its first national events in the run-up to the 2008 elections. Former Secretary of State Madeleine Albright and former Secretary of Defense Frank Carlucci signed on as National Co-Chairs and launched the effort at the U.S. Chamber of Commerce in July 2007. It now has field offices in South Carolina, Texas and Colorado. It plays an active role in key states nationwide by hosting political candidates and bringing together prominent political, business, and community leaders to discuss how federal diplomacy and development programs abroad benefited their local economy.

== Leadership ==
Numerous business leaders serve on the USGLC's Leadership Boards. The Coalition maintains three Advisory Councils. The policy council is composed of former members of Congress and Cabinet officials who advanced American global engagement during their careers. It includes every living former Secretary of State since Henry Kissinger, from both sides of the aisle. The National Security Advisory Council includes 160 retired three and four-starred generals and admirals representing all five branches of the Armed Forces who support diplomatic and development spending, alongside defense. The Business Advisory Council is chaired by Christopher Policinski.

Jason Gross became executive director in 2016. Liz Schrayer remains the president and CEO.

== Mission ==
The USGLC describes its mission as supporting "a smart power approach of elevating diplomacy and development alongside defense in order to build a better, safer world." The three key reason it identifies to support this goal are enhancing national security and fighting terrorism, building economic prosperity and developing international markets; and strengthening humanitarian values by fighting disease, reducing hunger, expanding educational opportunities and strengthening democratic institutions globally. These goals are achieved through a combination of advocacy and education efforts.

== Political campaign ==
During the 2008 U.S. presidential election, the USGLC ran a campaign entitled "Impact '08: Building a Better, Safer World" to engage with each campaign and with voters and shine the spotlight on the International Affairs Budget. Impact 08 held events throughout the country (particularly in Iowa, New Hampshire, Ohio, and other battlegrounds) that brought together each state's most prominent political, business, and community leaders to discuss specifically how federal diplomacy and development programs abroad benefited their local economy.

Since 2008, the USGLC leadership also met with senior figures on every candidate’s campaign pressing them to provide a more detailed plan on foreign policy and the role of development and serving as a resource for campaigns’ questions regarding the International Affairs Budget. The Coalition also hosted a series on “Salon Dinners” during the election with policy and journalist elites to discuss the role of diplomacy and development in the forthcoming presidency. Attendees included Colin Powell, Bill Gates and Tom Daschle.

== Putting Smart Power to Work ==
After the 2008 election, the U.S. Global Leadership Coalition launched "Putting Smart Power to Work," an initiative to work at both the grassroots level and directly with members of Congress in prioritizing and expanding the international affairs budget during the Obama administration. The coalition has continued to expand its grassroots network to develop a stronger voice amongst politicians' constituents and meets frequently with members of Congress and the Obama administration.

As part of "Putting Smart Power to Work," the USGLC announced that it was partnering with numerous veterans groups under the banner of "Veterans for Smart Power" to encourage veterans to voice their support for civilian programs that complement the military's efforts abroad.

== Global Plum Book ==
The same day that the government published its "Plum Book" listing of available jobs for the incoming administration, the USGLC released the "Global Plum Book", a document that cataloged the top 100 positions across the new Obama administration that would strongly impact the policies and programs for development and diplomacy. The coalition identified hundreds of Democrats and Republicans that could potentially fill these positions and held meetings with these individuals to educate them on the Coalition's priorities. The book was released during a widely attended forum on the transition moderated by Jim Lehrer of the PBS NewsHour.
