= Nancy Tilly =

American children's author (born 1935)

- Born: June 8, 1935 (age 91); Atlanta, Georgia, U.S.
- Education: University of North Carolina at Chapel Hill (BA, MA); University of Chicago (MA)
- Occupation: Author
- Writing career
- Genre: Children's literature

Nancy Tilly (born June 8, 1935) is an American children's author.

== Biography ==
She was born on June 8, 1935, in Atlanta, Georgia. She received a BA and MA from the University of North Carolina at Chapel Hill, and an MA from the University of Chicago.

Tilly taught English and humanities at the City Colleges of Chicago until 1973. She taught creative writing classes at local elementary schools through 1982, when she took time off to work on her book, Golden Girl from FSG in 1985. In the 1990s, she taught English and creative writing at North Carolina State University.

Published in 1985 by Farrar, Straus and Giroux, Golden Girl is set in coastal North Carolina and follows the life of young Penny as she realizes appearances are not always what they seem and one can be happy even if one is not rich. The book won the 1986 North Carolina American Association of University Women Award for the best juvenile book. Her memoir of her Atlanta upbringing, Rebel Belle: The Making of a Narcissist, is available from Amazon. Tilly's Young Adult novel, The Island Summer, follows Caro's adventures on Tybee Island as she worries her parents may divorce. But the boy next door and her first Yankee friend Aviva are new friends. There are dungeons, a firetower and a mine from World War II. Wilmington Island features glamorous cousins who are opposites, a runaway horse, a boat trip and a sea rescue.

Tilly also writes and edits short stories, book reviews, and short articles. Her short stories include "Belle of the Ball," "Marina Grande" and "Two Women." She is a reporter and editor of The Mirror, at Frasier Meadows (Boulder, Colorado).
