= Marion Danis =

American physician

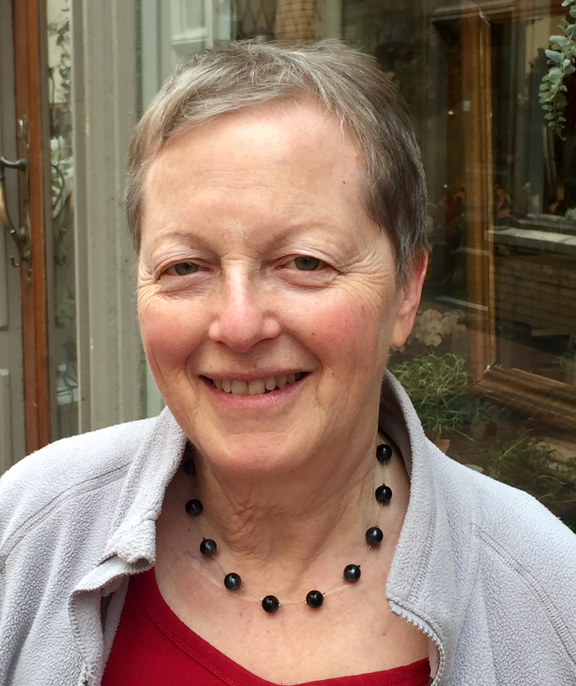
- Danis in 2018
- Education: University of Chicago
- Scientific career
- Fields: Bioethics
- Workplaces: University of North Carolina at Chapel Hill; National Institutes of Health Clinical Center

Marion Danis is an American bioethicist and physician-scientist. She is head of the section on ethics and health policy and chief of the bioethics consultation service at the National Institutes of Health Clinical Center.

== Education ==
Danis completed a B.A. at the University of Chicago and an M.D. at the Pritzker School of Medicine. Following medical school, Danis trained in internal medicine at University of North Carolina at Chapel Hill (UNC).

== Career ==
Danis served on the faculty of the Division of General Medicine and Clinical Epidemiology at UNC before coming to National Institutes of Health (NIH) in 1997. While at UNC, she also directed the medical intensive care unit, chaired the UNC Hospitals Ethics Committee, and served as a faculty member of the Robert Wood Johnson Clinical Scholars Program and as a research associate at the Cecil G. Sheps Health Services Research Center. In addition, she has chaired the Ethics Committee of the Society of Critical Care Medicine. At the National Institutes of Health Clinical Center, Danis serves as head of the section on ethics and health policy and chief of the bioethics consultation service.

Danis' research has focused on strategies for balancing the competing concerns of respect for patient preferences and fair distribution of limited resources. She has conducted studies on advance directives and the effect of patient preferences in end-of-life treatment decisions. Her current work is centered on strategies for public engagement in the rationing of health care, which led Danis to collaborate with Susan Goold to design CHAT, "Choosing Healthplans All Together," a simulation exercise.

She is particularly interested in increasing access to care and improving the health of disadvantaged populations. Toward this end, she has studied the priorities of low income urban populations regarding interventions to address the social determinants of health and reduce health disparities. In addition she has been interested in promoting approaches that bioethicists might pursue to address racism.

Since the beginning of 2010, her research in collaboration with colleagues has led to the publication of over 60 articles and two books. She led the Bioethics Consultation Service faculty in authoring the book, Research Ethics Consultation: A Casebook, with Oxford University Press. She also led in authoring and editing Fair Resource Allocation and Rationing at the Bedside, with Oxford University Press.

In 2014, she was involved in addressing the ethical tensions that have arisen during the Western African Ebola virus epidemic as a member of the World Health Organization Ethics Panel on Use of Investigational Agents during the Ebola epidemic and as a member of the Interagency Working Group on Ebola in the United States Department of Health and Human Services.

== Selected works ==
- Danis, Marion; Largent, Emily; Grady, Christine; Wendler, David; Hull, Sara Chandros (2012). Research Ethics Consultation: A Casebook. Oxford University Press, USA. ISBN 978-0-19-979803-2.
- Danis, Marion; Hurst, Samia A.; Fleck, Leonard M.; Førde, Reidun; Slowther, Anne, eds. (2014). Fair Resource Allocation and Rationing at the Bedside. Oxford University Press. ISBN 978-0-19-998944-7.
