= Alice Brooks McGuire =

American professor of library science; librarian

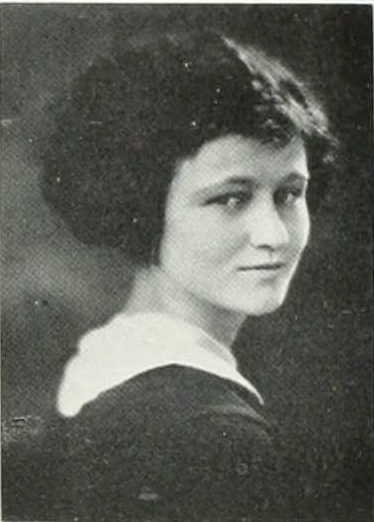
- Born: Alice Rebecca Brooks; August 9, 1902; Philadelphia
- Died: July 9, 1975 (aged 72); Arizona
- Education: A.B., Spanish, Smith College; B.S., library science, Drexel Institute of Technology; M.S., library science, Columbia University; PhD., University of Chicago
- Spouse: John Carson McGuire (m. 1947)
- Parent(s): John and Anna Brooks

Alice Rebecca Brooks McGuire (August 9, 1902 – July 9, 1975), nicknamed "Sally", was an American librarian. She was named Librarian of the Year by the Texas Library Association, and taught at the University of Texas in its Graduate School of Library Science.

== Early life and education ==
Alice Rebecca Brooks was born on August 9, 1902, in Philadelphia, to John and Anna Brooks. Both of her parents were schoolteachers, and she was educated at Philadelphia High School for Girls. After earning her high school diploma, she graduated from Smith College in 1923 with a Bachelor of Arts. She used this degree as an assistant librarian and librarian of laboratory schools at Slippery Rock State Teachers College, from 1923 to 1928. In 1924, she organized an elementary school library while in teacher's college.

She temporarily left the field of librarying to earn a Bachelor of Science degree in library science from Drexel Institute of Technology in 1926, after which she studied at Columbia University and the University of Chicago. Her thesis from the University of Chicago was titled Developmental values of children's literature.

== Career ==
While in Chicago, she directed the Center for Instruction Materials. She was also an editor for three children's encyclopedias and edited columns on children's library services. After her marriage to John Carson McGuire, she tried to gain employment at the Graduate School of Library Science in Texas, but was refused because her husband worked there. As a result, she was appointed as a librarian of Casis Elementary School in partnership with the university. Brooks McGuire sat on the Newbery and Caldecott Awards Committee. For one year, from 1953 to 1954, she served as president of the American Association of School Librarians. In 1960, she was one of the editors of the handbook The Standards for School Library Programs.

In 1963, she joined the University of Texas in their Graduate School of Library Science as an associate professor. By 1968, she was the recipient of Librarian of the Year by the Texas Library Association. In 1996, the University of Texas created the Alice Brooks McGuire Endowed Scholarship.

She died on July 9, 1975, aged 72.
