= Ida Kraus Ragins =

Russian-born American biochemist

- Born: 10 October 1894; Russian Empire
- Died: September 1985 (aged 90)
- Education: University of Chicago (A.B., M.S., Ph.D.)
- Spouse: Oscar B. Ragins
- Scientific career
- Fields: Biochemistry
- Workplaces: University of Chicago; Cook County Hospital; Northwestern Medical School; Chicago College of Osteopathic Medicine

Ida Kraus Ragins (10 October 1894 – September 1985) was a Russian-born American biochemist.

She received her undergraduate and graduate degrees (A.B., M.S., and Ph.D.) in biochemistry from the University of Chicago. Ragins worked at the University of Chicago, Cook County Hospital, and the Northwestern Medical School. She later served as head of the department of chemistry at the Chicago College of Osteopathic Medicine.

She was married to Dr. Oscar B. Ragins.

== Life and work ==
Ida Kraus Ragins was born in the Russian Empire to Bernard and Gertrude Kraus. The family emigrated to the United States before 1915. That year, she began working as an assistant in quantitative analysis in the Department of Chemistry at the University of Chicago, possibly as a student position. She received her B.A. in 1918 and her M.S. in 1919.

After completing her master’s degree, Kraus Ragins taught for a year at the Oklahoma College for Women, before returning to Chicago to pursue doctoral studies. She earned her Ph.D. in 1924 and subsequently joined the University of Chicago as an instructor in biochemistry.

In 1924, the same year she completed her doctorate, Kraus married physician Oscar B. Ragins. They had two children: Naomi (born 1926) and Herzl (born 1929), both of whom became physicians.

Kraus Ragins became a senior chemist at Cook County Hospital in 1937. Her research included studies on protein specificity reactions and amino acids. She published several papers, including a 1929 co-authored study on the fractionation of provitamin D, and a 1933 article on ammonia production from tryptic and peptic digestion of casein.

In 1946, Kraus Ragins joined the Northwestern Medical School as a senior chemist in experimental medicine. She remained there until 1949, when she accepted a position as head of the Department of Biochemistry at the Chicago College of Osteopathic Medicine.

Little is known about her later life and career.
