= Eve van Cauter =

Professor of Medicine

Eve Van Cauter is an American researcher on sleep, glucose regulation, and endocrinology. She is the Frederick H. Rawson Professor in the section of adult and pediatric endocrinology, diabetes and metabolism, and the director of the sleep, metabolism and health center at the University of Chicago. She was one of the first people to discover that sleep deprivation effects the body. Van Cauter has published papers on the effect sleep loss and disturbances have on the metabolism and insulin resistance, respectively, as well as the connections between sleep and glucose regulation, obesity, and the endocrine system
