= Bonnier (surname) =

Bonnier is a surname. Notable people with the surname include:

- Åke Bonnier (born 1957), Swedish bishop in the Diocese of Skara
- Antoine Bonnier d'Alco (1750–1790), French diplomat during the French Revolution
- Céline Bonnier (born 1965), Canadian actress
- Eva Bonnier (1855–1907), Swedish painter
- Fernand Bonnier de La Chapelle (1922–1942), member of the French resistance
- Gaëtan Bonnier (1857–1944), French general
- Gaston Bonnier (1853–1922), French botanist and plant ecologist
- Joakim Bonnier (1930–1972), Swedish racing driver
- Jonas Bonnier (born 1957), Swedish novelist
- Joseph-Arsène Bonnier (1879–1962), Canadian politician
- Lies Bonnier (1925–2021), Dutch swimmer
- Lukas Bonnier (1922–2006), Swedish publisher
- Valérie Bonnier, French actress and novelist

== See also ==
- Bonnier family
