= Bonnier =

Bonnier may refer to:

- Bonnier Group, a privately held Swedish media group
- Bonnier family, a Swedish family related to the conglomerate
- Bonnier (surname)
- Bunder, a unit of area
