= Gerhard Bonnier =

Book publisher (1778–1862)

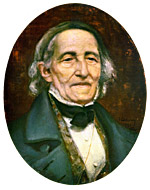
- Born: 21 October 1778; Dresden, Electorate of Saxony
- Died: April 18, 1862 (aged 83); Copenhagen, Denmark
- Occupation: Publisher
- Known for: Progenitor to the Bonnier family
- Spouse: Ester Elkan
- Children: 10, including Albert Bonnier

Gerhard Bonnier (born Gutkind Hirschel, October 21, 1778, in Dresden – April 18, 1862, in Copenhagen) was a book publisher and the progenitor to the Swedish Bonnier family, active in book industry and later in the mass media industry under the Bonnier Group.

== Biography ==
Bonnier was born in Dresden to a jeweller named Löbel Salomon Hirschel and Feile Srasser. The family had its origins in Sobědruhy, Bohemia, where they had been active in jewellery trade since the 17th century. The Hirschels were Jewish and spoke Yiddish and German. In 1801, he migrated to Denmark and began working as a language teacher. It was at this time that he adopted the name Gerhard Bonnier. The inspiration for his new surname has been speculated to come from the French nobleman Ange-Élisabeth-Louis-Antoine Bonnier. He married Ester Elkan, from the Jewish community in Denmark, in 1803, and they had 10 children, including Adolf Bonnier, Albert Bonnier, and David Felix Bonnier.

In 1804, he was given permission to open a bookstore on Købmagergade in Copenhagen and later established a publishing company as well as a library. He founded the newspaper Dagsposten in 1816 acting as chief editor, however, both the newspaper and his publishing company had gone bankrupt by 1821. As business in Copenhagen later soured, he sent his sons to Sweden, where Albert went on to found the publishing company Albert Bonniers Förlag.

During the last years of his life, Bonnier became economically dependent on his son Adolf, and he tried to establish an antiquarian business but was charged with possession of stolen goods in 1858.
