= Media proprietor =

Businessperson who controls media consumed by individuals

A media proprietor, also called a media executive, media mogul, media tycoon, or press baron is an entrepreneur who controls any means of public or commercial mass media, through the personal ownership or holding of a dominant position within a media conglomerate or enterprise. Those with significant control of a large media-based forum may also be called a business magnate. Since the advent of social media, influencers and entertainers who have garnered large followings on platforms have also been considered media proprietors.

== History ==
In the United States, newspaper proprietors first became prominent in the 19th century with the development of mass circulation newspapers. In the 20th century, proprietorship expanded to include ownership of radio and television networks, as well as film studios, publishing houses, online platforms, and other forms of multimedia companies. Reflecting this, the term "press baron" was replaced by "media baron" and the term "media mogul" (or "Hollywood mogul" when applied to people specifically working in the American film industry) was popularized in colloquial English. Media proprietors are likely to claim that their publications are editorially independent and unbiased, but this is often questioned. Social networking services, such as Facebook, are sometimes considered media companies due to their widespread influence.

== Notable media proprietors ==
- Max Aitken, 1st Baron Beaverbrook
- Sally Aw
- Andrej Babiš
- Zdeněk Bakala
- David and Frederick Barclay
- Silvio Berlusconi
- Jeff Bezos
- Conrad Black
- Michael Bloomberg
- Lukas Bonnier
- Scooter Braun
- Subhash Chandra
- Assis Chateaubriand
- Gustavo Cisneros
- Victor Civita
- Sean Combs
- Richard Desmond
- Hans Dichand
- Walt Disney
- Aydın Doğan
- Jack Dorsey
- Iris Fontbona
- Steve Forbes
- Octávio Frias
- Sheyene Gerardi
- Lew Grade
- Alfred Harmsworth, 1st Viscount Northcliffe
- Harold Harmsworth, 1st Viscount Rothermere
- Jonathan Harmsworth, 4th Viscount Rothermere
- William Randolph Hearst
- Robert Hersant
- Alfred Hugenberg
- Sir Edward Hulton, 1st Baronet
- Jay-Z
- Ekta Kapoor
- Jeffrey Katzenberg
- Tony Khan
- Jean-Luc and Arnaud Lagardère
- Jimmy Lai
- Henry Luce
- Edir Macedo
- Roberto Marinho
- Robert Maxwell
- Vince McMahon
- John de Mol Jr.
- Javier Moll
- Sun Myung Moon
- Rupert Murdoch
- Elon Musk
- Samuel Newhouse
- Roberto Noble
- Denis O'Brien
- Davíð Oddsson
- Tony O'Reilly
- Kerry Packer
- Dave Portnoy
- Shahrzad Rafati
- Sumner Redstone
- Mir Shakil ur Rehman
- Pat Robertson
- Jaume Roures
- Haim Saban
- Silvio Santos
- Manmohan Shetty
- Matsutaro Shoriki
- Evan Spiegel
- Axel Springer
- A. G. Sulzberger
- Al-Waleed bin Talal
- Chairul Tanjung
- Hary Tanoesoedibjo
- David Thomson
- Roy Thomson, 1st Baron Thomson of Fleet
- Ted Turner
- Tsuneo Watanabe
- Jan Wejchert
- Oprah Winfrey
- Mark Zuckerberg
- Francisco Pinto Balsemão
