= The Helicopter Heist (miniseries) =

2024 Swedish action thriller television miniseries

- Swedish Netflix poster
- Swedish: Helikopterrånet
- Genre: Action thriller
- Created by: Ronnie Sandahl
- Based on: The Helicopter Heist by Jonas Bonnier
- Written by: Ronnie Sandahl
- Directed by: Daniel Espinosa (episodes 1, 2, and 6, also conceptual director); Jonas Alexander Arnby (episodes 3, 4, and 5); Anna Zackrisson (episodes 7 and 8)
- Starring: Mahmut Suvakci; Ardalan Esmaili; Iskra Kostić; Dejan Milačić; Erik Svedberg-Zelman; Vic Carmen Sonne; Johanna Hedberg; Wim Elfwencrona
- Composer: Jon Ekstrand
- Country of origin: Sweden
- Original languages: Swedish; Serbian
- No. of episodes: 8

Production
- Executive producers: Ulf Synnerholm; Ronnie Sandahl; Daniel Espinosa; Niclas Salomonsson; Jonas Bonnier
- Producer: Johannes Åhlund
- Cinematography: Erik Molberg Hansen; Niels Thastum; Juan Sarmiento G.
- Running time: 38–49 minutes
- Production company: B-Reel Films

Original release
- Network: Netflix
- Release: 20 November 2024

The Helicopter Heist (Swedish: Helikopterrånet) is a Swedish action thriller television miniseries created by Ronnie Sandahl, based on the 2017 novel of the same name by Jonas Bonnier about the Västberga helicopter robbery. It premiered at the Stockholm International Film Festival on 15 November 2024 and was released on Netflix on 22 November 2024.

== Cast ==
- Mahmut Suvakci as Rami Farhan, based on robber Safa Kadhum
- Ardalan Esmaili as Michel Maloof, based on organizer Charbel Charro
- Iskra Kostić as Leonie Hamsik
- Dejan Milačić as Zoran Petrović, based on organizer Goran Bojović
- Erik Svedberg-Zelman as Axel Broberg, based on helicopter pilot Alexander Eriksson
- Vic Carmen Sonne as Alexandra "Alex" Refn
- Johanna Hedberg as Karin Lagerstedt, Rami's wife
- Wim Elfwencrona as Niklas "Nicke" Larsson, based on organizer Mikael Södergran

== Episodes ==
No.	Title	Duration	Original release date
1	"Best Friends" (Bästa vänner)	49 minutes	22 November 2024
2	"The White Whale" (Den vita valen)	45 minutes	22 November 2024
3	"The Devil Is in the Details" (Djävulen bor i detaljerna)	41 minutes	22 November 2024
4	"Cat and Mouse" (Katt och råtta)	47 minutes	22 November 2024
5	"Making Tsunami" (Göra Tsunami)	38 minutes	22 November 2024
6	"Showtime"	41 minutes	22 November 2024
7	"The Hunt" (Jakten)	45 minutes	22 November 2024
8	"Too Close to the Sun" (För nära solen)	48 minutes	22 November 2024

== Production ==
In October 2016, Nine Stories Productions, which was founded by Jake Gyllenhaal, acquired the rights to the novel with the intention of adapting it into a film for Netflix. However, the project never came to fruition, and B-Reel Films secured the rights to the novel in May 2022.

Principal photography began in Stockholm in March 2023.

== Release ==
Promotional stills were released on 14 August 2024. The series premiered at the Stockholm International Film Festival on 15 November 2024. It was released on Netflix on 22 November 2024.
