= Lukas Bonnier =

Swedish publisher (1922–2006)

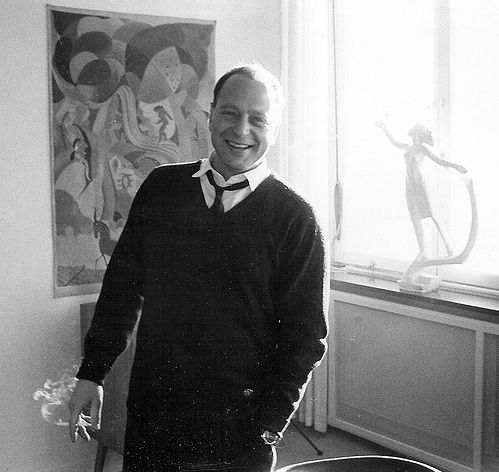

Per Lukas Daniel Bonnier (16 June 1922 – 8 February 2006) was a Swedish publisher. He was a member of the Bonnier family, the son of Tor Bonnier.

Bonnier was president of Åhlen & Åkerlunds tidskriftsförlag from 1957 to 1978 and 1980–1982. He then became chairman of the board of Bonniers Tidskriftsförlag. In 1989, he succeeded his brother Albert as chairman of Bonnierföretagen.

Lukas Bonnier obtained the rights to produce a comic book in Sweden, based on the comic The Phantom, and was a personal friend of The Phantom’s creator, Lee Falk. The Swedish comic book began in 1950 and is, as of 2023 still being published.

== Bibliography ==
- Jacobsson, Cecilia (2006-02-08). "Lukas Bonnier död". Dagens Nyheter. Dagens Nyheter.
- Kleen, Björn af (2014). Lucke & Lull: arvet efter en Bonnier. Månpocket (in Swedish). Stockholm: Weyler förlag. ISBN 9789175033129. OCLC 15177916.
- Nilsson, Kerstin (2006-02-09). "Kisen Lukas Bonnier blev 83". Aftonbladet.
- "Lukas Bonnier". Nationalencyklopedin.
- "Lukas Bonnier död". SVT Nyheter. Sveriges Television. 2006-02-08.
