= Dušan Třeštík =

Czech historian (1933–2007)

Dušan Třeštík (1 August 1933 – 23 August 2007) was a Czech historian. He specialized in medieval history (Dark Ages (500–1000)) of the Czech lands and theory of history.

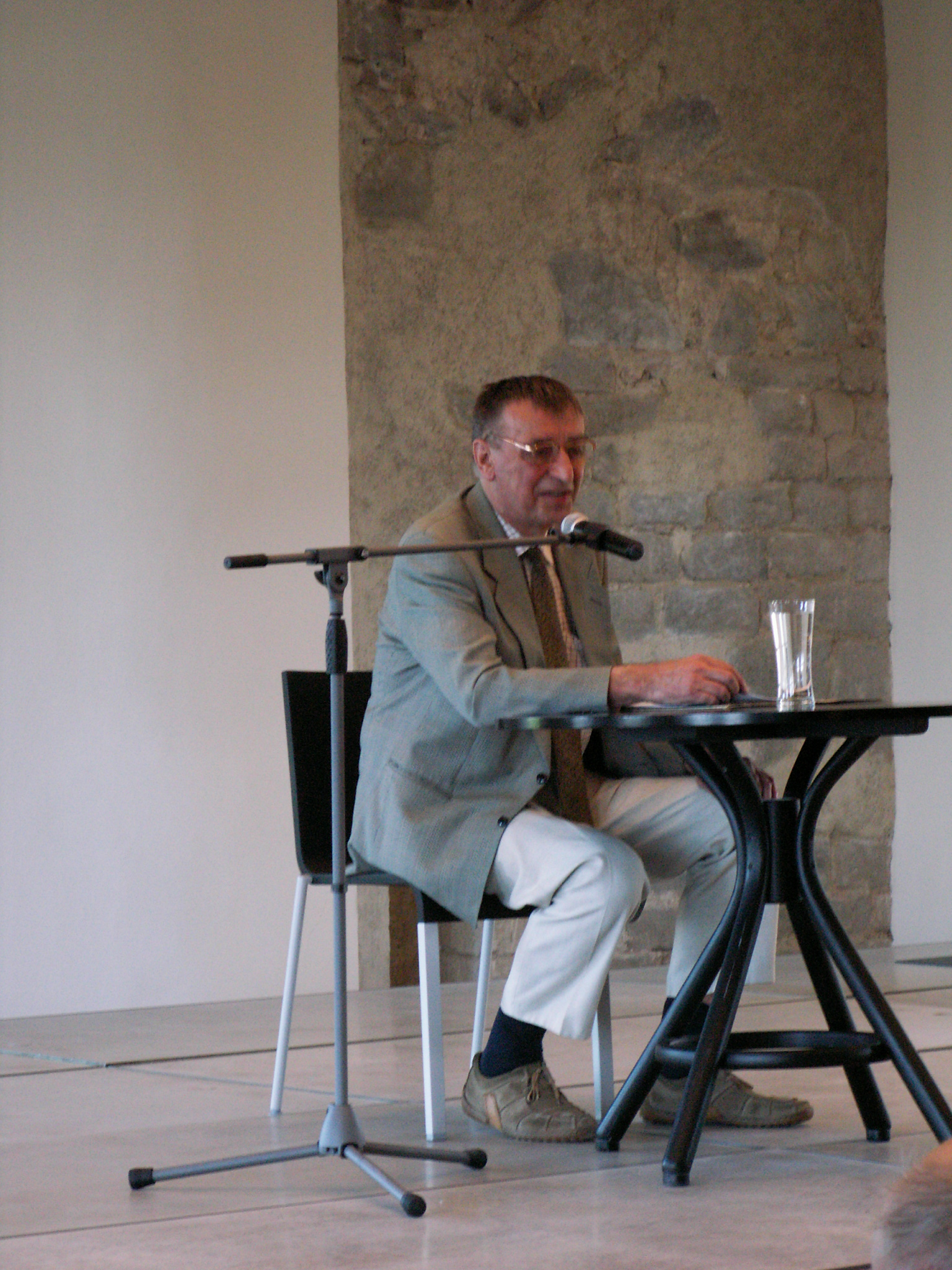
Dušan Třeštík giving a lecture on the Přemyslid dynasty (2006)

== Early life and education ==
Třeštík was born on 1 August 1933 in Sobědruhy, now a part of the city of Teplice. He studied history at the Charles University from 1951 to 1956 where his tutor was František Graus.

== Career ==
After two years at the Charles University, since 1958 he worked in the Historic Institute of the Academy of Science and Arts. In his later years he was prominent in its Centre of Medieval Studies. In 1959 he married historian Barbara Krzemieńska and in 1968 he studied in West Germany and France. Třeštík was a stark defender of veracity Kristián's legend. As a theorist of history he criticised the neopositivist approach of the mainstream Czech history scholarship and its icon Josef Pekař. He labeled it as faktopis.

Since 1989 he also published political texts (collected as Češi. Jejich národ, stát, dějiny a pravdy v transformaci, 1999), especially in Lidové Noviny (from 1993 to 1996 he was a member of its editorial board) and Mladá Fronta Dnes. He criticised Sudeten Germans, but he joined Impuls 99 despite being close to Václav Klaus. After 9/11 Třeštík was sceptical towards neoconservative politics and the invasion of Iraq.

== Death ==
Třeštík died in Prague on 23 August 2007.

== Selected works ==
1. Kosmova kronika: Studie k počátkům českého dějepisectví a politického myšlení (1968)
2. Románské umění v Čechách a na Moravě (1983)
3. Počátky Přemyslovců (1981)
4. Počátky Přemyslovců: Vstup Čechů do dějin (510–935) (1997)
5. Mysliti dějiny (1999)
6. Češi: Jejich národ, stát, dějiny a pravdy v transformaci (1999)
7. Vznik Velké Moravy: Moravané, Čechové a střední Evropa v letech 781–871 (2001)
8. Mýty kmene Čechů (7. – 10. století): Tři studie ke Starým pověstem českým (2003)
9. Češi a dějiny v postmoderním očistci (2005)
