= Västberga helicopter robbery =

Swedish depot-robbery with a helicopter

Coordinates: 59.29802°N 18.01300°E

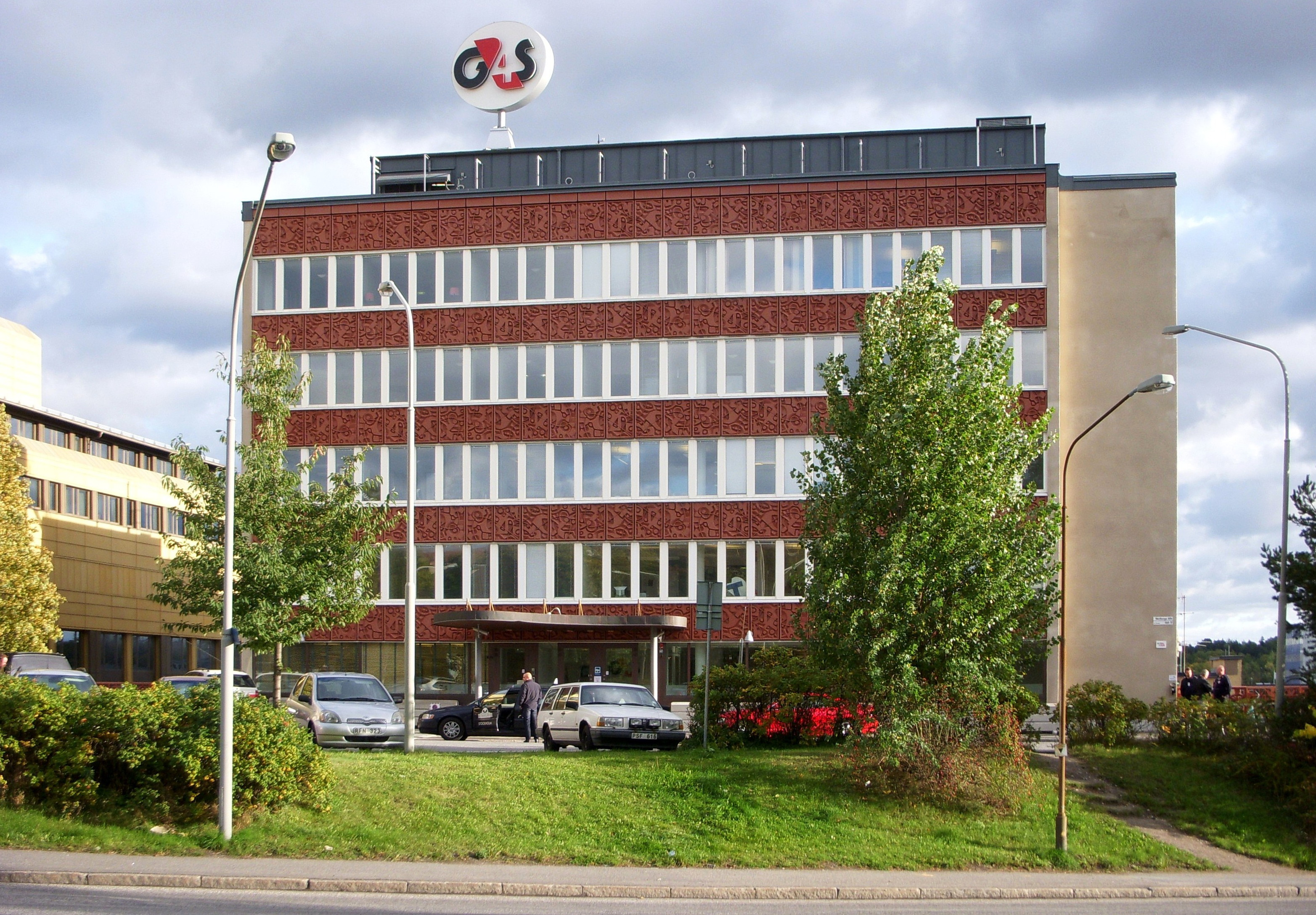
- G4S Västberga building (2009)
- Native name: Helikopterrånet
- Date: 23 September 2009
- Time: ~5:15 (CEST)
- Location: Västberga, Stockholm
- Motive: money
- Budget: 39kr million (€4 million)

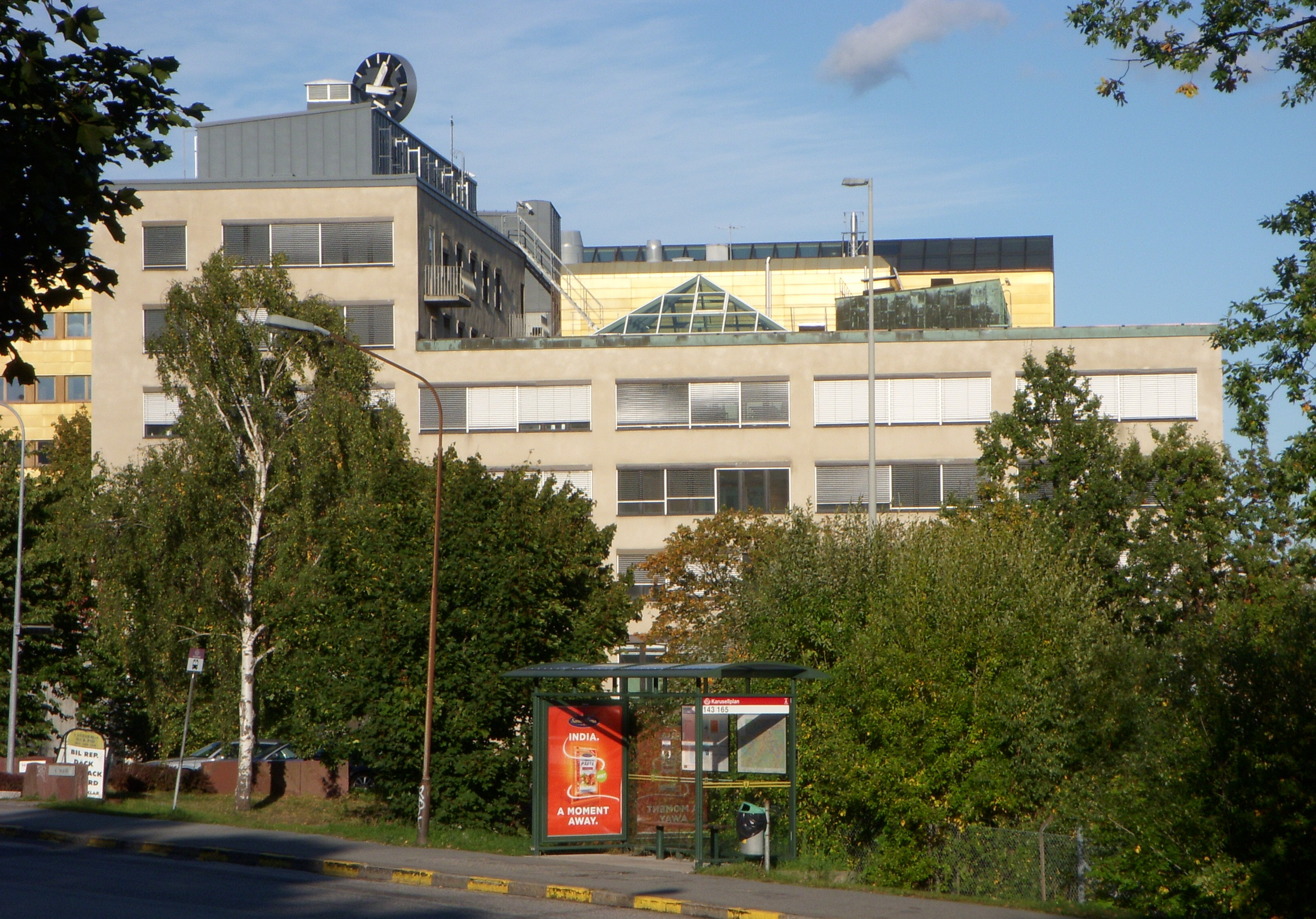
G4S Västberga

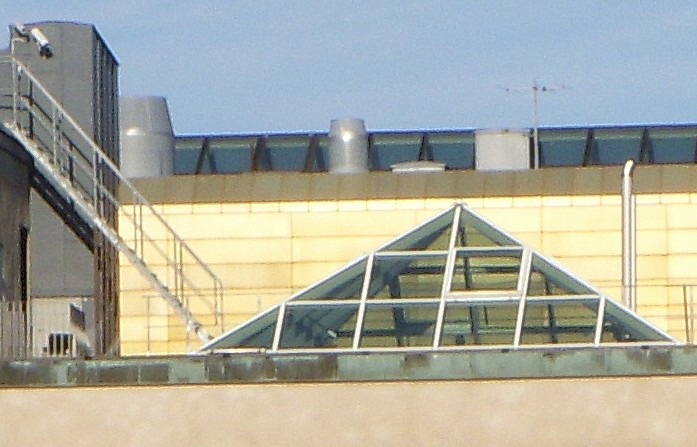
The glass pyramid on 28 September 2009, from which the robbers entered the building

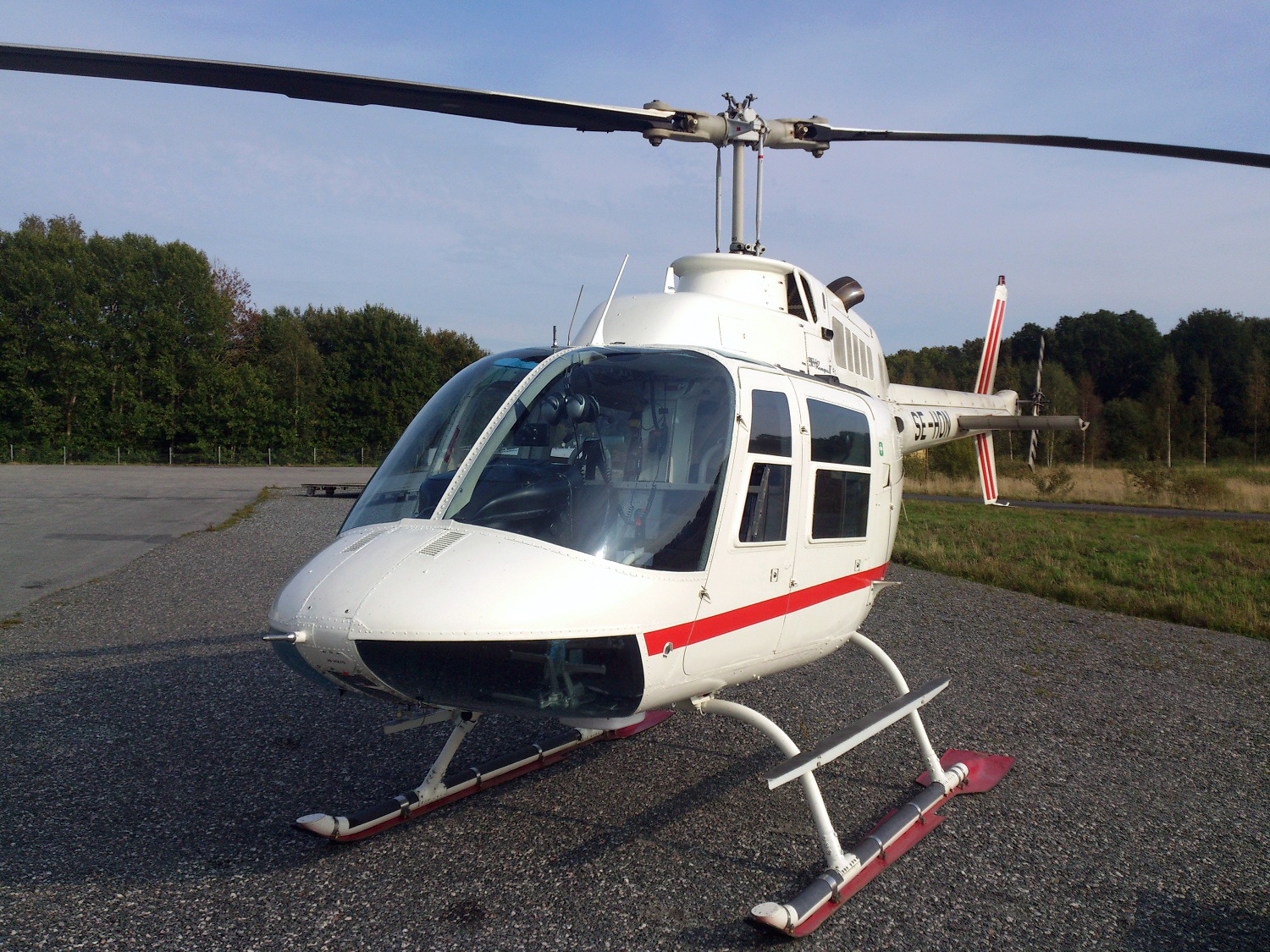
The stolen Bell 206 JetRanger helicopter that was used in the robbery

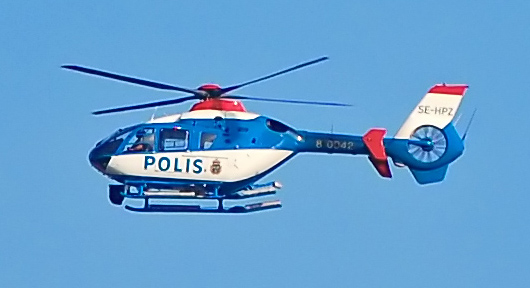
A Eurocopter EC135 of the Swedish police

The Västberga helicopter robbery occurred on 23 September 2009 at 05:15 CEST when a G4S cash service depot was robbed in Västberga, in Southern Stockholm, Sweden. The robbers used a stolen Bell 206 JetRanger as transportation and landed on the rooftop of the G4S building.

The police were unable to use their own helicopters to pursue the robbers since decoy bombs had been placed close to them. A Swedish krona 7 million (€659,190) reward was announced the following day for anyone with information that could lead to the arrest of the robbers or the return of the stolen goods. This was the first robbery involving a helicopter in Swedish history. The kr 39 million (€4 million) loot was never recovered.

== Timeline of events ==
=== 23 September 2009 ===
- Prior to the robbery, caltrops had been placed on the roads around the cash service building to prevent police cars from gaining access. Furthermore, decoy bombs were placed at the entrance of the police helicopter hangar at Myttinge on the island of Värmdö, preventing police from operating them during the heist.
- 4:35 (CEST): A Bell 206 helicopter is stolen from Roslagens Helikopterflyg's hangar at Mellingeholm Airfield in Norrtälje.
- 5:15 (CEST): The helicopter arrives at the G4S cash service building. Three to four people land on the rooftop and enter the building by breaking a reinforced glass pyramid construction with a sledgehammer. Small bombs go off inside the building, likely to blow security doors open. The 21 bank employees inside the building manage to hide in a security vault, and none of them are physically harmed during the heist. Bags with kr 39 million (€4 million) in printed money are thereafter loaded into the helicopter.
- 05:25 (CEST): The Swedish police arrive at the building but do not intervene, due to reports of the use of submachine guns.
- 05:35 (CEST): The helicopter takes off from the rooftop with all the robbers and the money on board.
- The helicopter landed at Kanaanbadet.
- 08:15 (CEST): The helicopter used in the robbery is found in the woods just outside a field at Skavlöten in Arninge, twenty kilometres north of Stockholm.
- Two JAS 39 Gripen were conducting a drill over the Baltic Sea and the Swedish Air Force offered assistance. It was turned down since the robbery was a civilian matter and not a military one.

=== Subsequent events ===
Swedish police arrested six male suspects in connection with the robbery. They were listed as being aged 21 to 36, but were otherwise unidentified in accordance with Swedish privacy laws.

== Serbian intel ==
The Serbian Interior Minister Ivica Dačić claimed that former members of the BIA Red Berets took part in the robbery. One month prior to the robbery, Serbian police informed the Swedish embassy in Belgrade that a criminal group was preparing a robbery in Stockholm, but Swedish authorities apparently failed to act effectively on this information. One out of the seven sentenced men was from Serbia.

== Perpetrators ==
=== Arrests ===
Swedish police quickly identified and arrested the suspects. Two days after the robbery, Safa Kadhum flew to the Dominican Republic where he was arrested by local law enforcement at the Swedish government's request. Swedish police immediately chartered a private plane to bring him back to Sweden. Alexander Eriksson instead flew to the Canary Islands. He was met at the airport by a special operations unit of the Swedish police. The police identified Goran Bojovic as the one who led the robbery.

=== Sentences ===
Seven men were sentenced to prison terms in October 2010 for their participation in the robbery. Three men were cleared of all charges and police suspect that another 10 may have been involved, but their identities are unknown.

- Helicopter pilot – Alexander Eriksson: 8 years imprisonment
- Robber – Safa Kadhum: 8 years imprisonment
- Organiser – Charbel Charro: 5 years imprisonment
- Organiser – Mikael Södergran: 5 years imprisonment
- Organiser – Goran Bojovic: 8 years imprisonment
- Falsified alibi provider – Marcus Axelsson: 2 years imprisonment
- Falsified alibi provider – Tomas Broman: 1 year imprisonment

== In popular culture ==
The mission The Bureau Raid in Grand Theft Auto V (2013) by Rockstar Games involves the protagonists breaking into an agency building. In the roof entry approach, they fly a helicopter to the roof and enter through a glass pyramid skylight, an approach loosely based on the Västberga robbery.

In 2017, after interviewing four of the jailed perpetrators, Swedish-born author Jonas Bonnier published a semi-fictional novel called Helikopterrånet.

Swedish public television broadcaster Sveriges Television released a six-part Swedish-language documentary film called Helikopterrånet in 2017.

An eight-part miniseries based on Bonnier's novel, The Helicopter Heist, premiered on Netflix in 2024.

== See also ==
- NOKAS robbery
