= Tor Bonnier =

Swedish publisher (1883–1976)

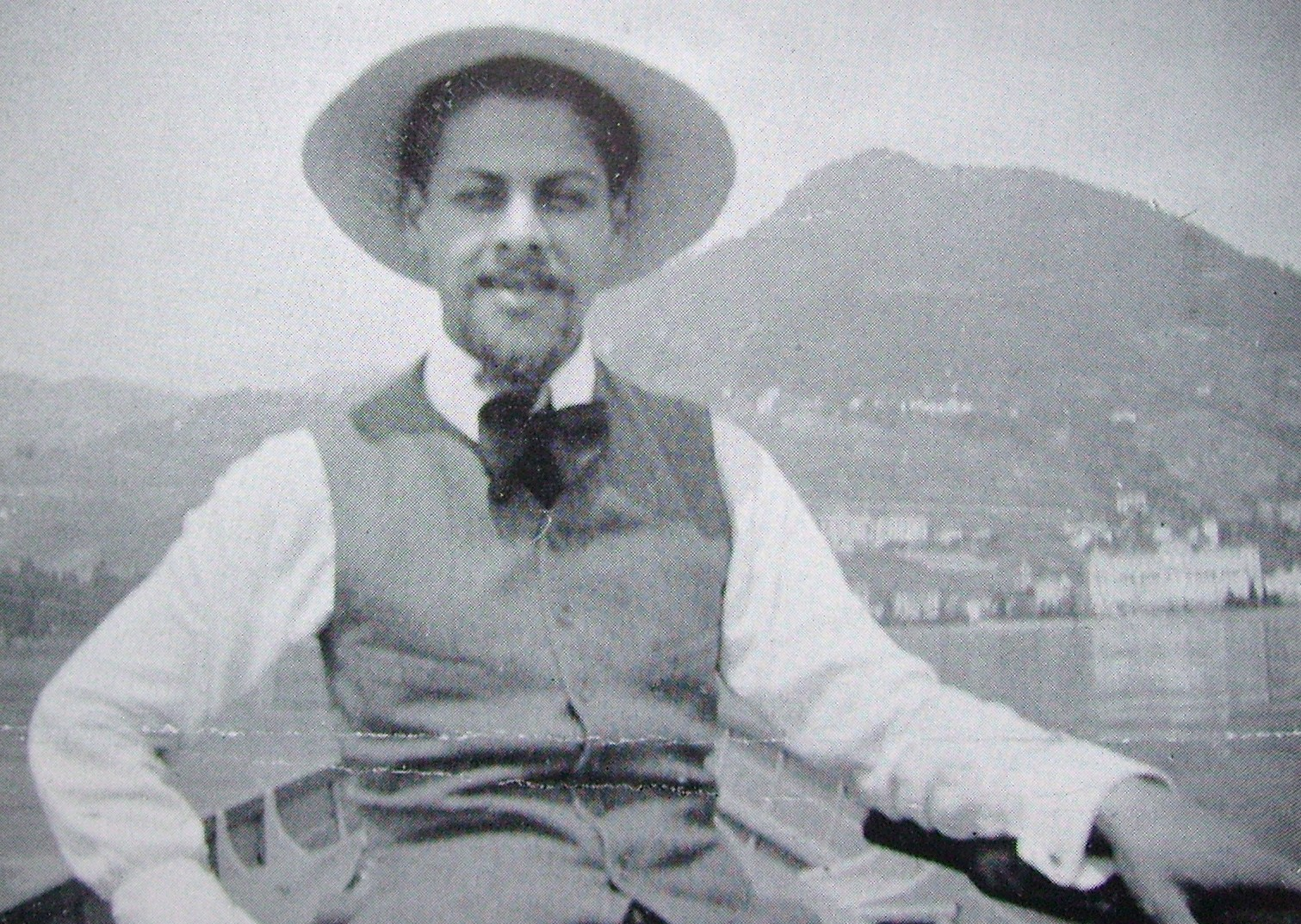
- Born: 3 January 1883; Stockholm, Sweden
- Died: 17 February 1976; Stockholm, Sweden
- Occupation: Publisher
- Known for: Leadership at Albert Bonniers Förlag
- Relatives: Greta Bonnier

Tor Bonnier (3 January 1883 – 17 February 1976) was a Swedish publisher and businessman associated with the publishing house Albert Bonniers Förlag. He became a partner in the firm in 1913 and later served as chairman of its board from 1941 to 1953.

Bonnier published several writers of the Swedish "tiotalisterna" generation, including Sigfrid Siwertz, Hjalmar Bergman, Marika Stiernstedt, Sven Lidman, Ludvig Nordström and Elin Wägner.

He also played a role in the wider Swedish press and media world. A scholarly history of Swedish newspapers notes his involvement in discussions surrounding the future ownership of Göteborgs-Posten in 1926, illustrating his prominence in Swedish media beyond book publishing.

Obituaries and retrospective coverage in major Swedish newspapers described Bonnier as one of the central figures in 20th-century Swedish publishing.
