= Bonnier Group =

Swedish publishing group

Bonnier AB

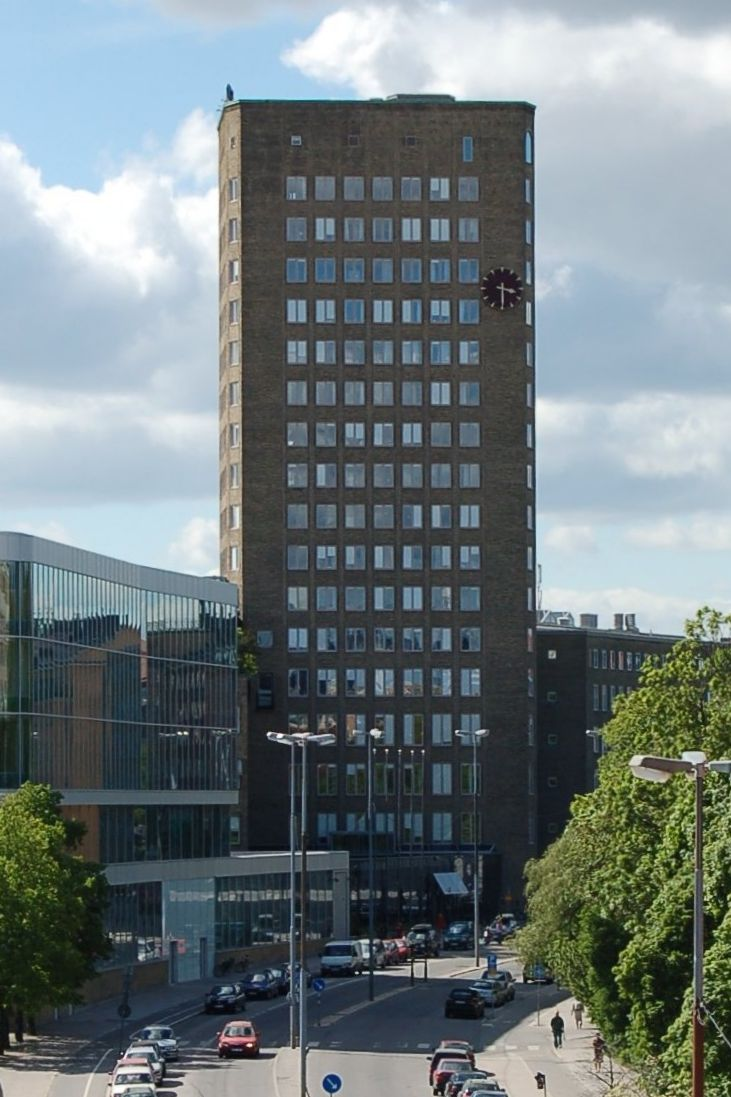
- Bonnier Tower in Stockholm
- Type: Private
- Industry: Mass media; E-commerce; Real estate
- Founded: 1804 in Copenhagen, Denmark
- Headquarters: Stockholm, Sweden
- Area served: Sweden
- Key people: Carl-Johan Bonnier (chairman); Tomas Franzén (CEO)
- Products: Newspapers, books, magazines, television and film production, online retailers
- Revenue: ▲US$4.097 billion (2013)
- Operating income: ▲US$305 million (2013)
- Net income: ▲US$227 million (2013)
- Number of employees: 9,226 (2013)
- Website: bonnier.com

Bonnier AB (Swedish pronunciation: [ˈbʊ̂nːiːr]), also the Bonnier Group, is a privately held Swedish media group of 175 companies operating in 15 countries. It is controlled by the Bonnier family.

== Background ==
The company was founded in 1804 by Gerhard Bonnier in Copenhagen, Denmark, when Bonnier published his first book, Underfulde og sandfærdige kriminalhistorier. Gerhard's sons later moved to Sweden. The Bonnier book publishing companies in Sweden that are part of book publishing house Bonnierförlagen now include Albert Bonniers förlag, Wahlström & Widstrand, Forum, and Bonnier Carlsen, as well as other book publishers and imprints in Sweden. Bonnier Tidskrifter publishes magazines, including Veckans Affärer, Damernas Värld, Amelia, Sköna hem, Teknikens Värld, Resume, nearly a dozen crossword magazines, and the tablet magazine C Mode. Other subsidiaries include the film production companies SF Studios and Sonet Film; daily newspapers Dagens Nyheter, Expressen, Sydsvenskan and Helsingborgs Dagblad; business daily Dagens Industri; and medical journal Dagens Medicin.

== International operations ==
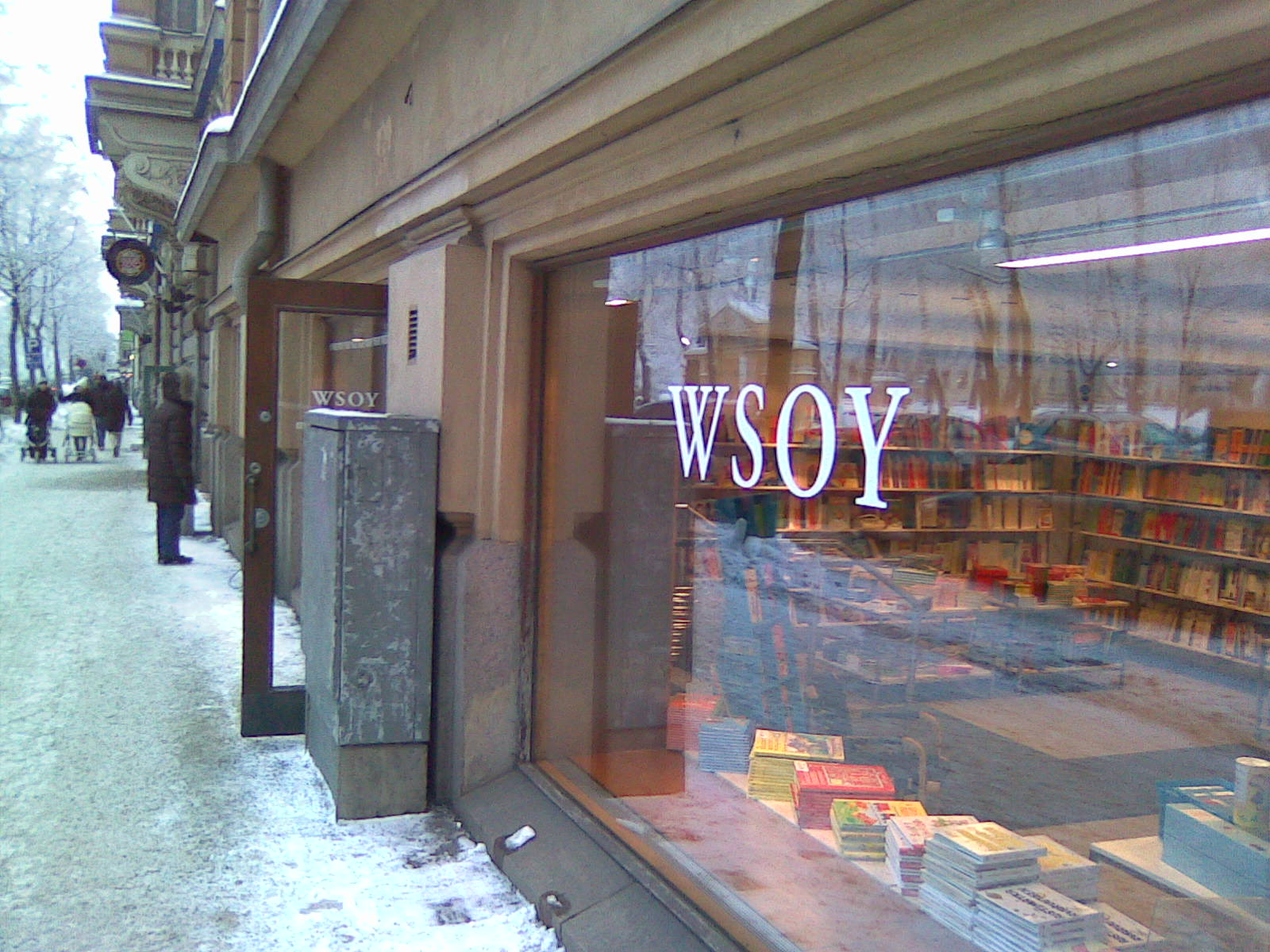
WSOY store

In Denmark, operations include magazine publisher Bonnier Publications, which has subsidiaries in Norway, Finland and Sweden; business daily Dagbladet Børsen; film distributors SF Film and film producers SF Film Production.

Finnish operations include book publishers Tammi and WSOY; plus magazines from Bonnier Publications and film productions by FS Film.

In Germany, Bonnier Media Deutschland includes Ullstein Buchverlage, Piper Verlag, Thienemann Verlag and Carlsen Verlag, among others.

In Malta, Bonnier owned Evoke Gaming Ltd. This was divested in late 2017.

In January 2007, the Bonnier Magazine Group acquired 18 magazines from the American media company Time Inc. (at the time owned by Time Warner) and merged the operations with other publishing companies to create the U.S. based Bonnier Corporation. As a result, Bonnier Corporation owns over 40 magazines, including Popular Science, Saveur, Field & Stream, Outdoor Life and Popular Photography, a range of action sport magazines focused on motorcycling, as well as a number of niche travel and lifestyle titles. Book publisher Weldon Owen was also part of the company. In 2013, Bonnier signed a deal with Source Interlink where they bought motorcycle franchises Dirt Rider, Motorcyclist, Sport Rider, Motorcycle Cruiser, Hot Bike, Baggers, Super Streetbike, Street Chopper and ATV Rider, whereas they sold Sound & Vision and the TransWorld franchise.

Bonnier's publishing in the United Kingdom has two main divisions: Igloo Books and Bonnier Books UK. A number of imprints operate within each division, most notably: Blink, Autumn Publishing, Hot Key Books, John Blake Publishing, Embla, Templar Publishing and Piccadilly Press, Zaffre and Studio Press. In 2015, Bonnier UK acquired commercial fiction publisher Totally Entwined. Weldon Owen UK and US was sold to Insight Editions in 2018.

Former operations include Piccolia in France and Five Mile Press in Australia which have both been liquidated.

Bonnier Publishing USA was formed in August 2016, then composed of the publisher Weldon Owen and the children's publisher, Little Bee. The president of Little Bee, Shimul Tolia, became the CEO of this group. Bonnier Publishing USA was sold to its management in 2019.

Bonnier owns business newspapers in Estonia (Äripäev), Lithuania (Verslo žinios), Poland (Puls Biznesu) and Slovenia (Finance Business Daily), as well as medical journals in Denmark, Norway, Finland, Poland, and Slovenia.

Bonnier is also behind several digital startups, including the tablet publishing platform Mag+ and children's toy app producer, Toca Boca (sold in 2016 to Spin Master).

In 2017, the Bonnier Motorcycle Group bought the AMA EnduroCross Championship, an off-road motorcycling series. The group also promotes the Quail Motorcycle Gathering, HighPipe, Track Day Shootout, Adventure Rally Series and Hot Bike Tour. Also in 2017, Bonnier sold Nordic Cinema Group to AMC Theatres.

On 20 July 2018, Telia Company announced the proposed acquisition of the Bonnier Broadcasting Group (which owns TV4 AB, MTV Oy and C More Entertainment) from Bonnier. The acquisition was completed on 2 December 2019.

On 6 February 2020, Bonnier Books UK launched literary imprint, Manilla Press. In October 2024, the UK division announced a restructuring with four imprints (Nine Eight, Heligo, John Blake and Black & White London) suspended. In April 2024, Bonnier acquired the Swedish musical instrument manufacturer Elektron.

== Ownership ==
Bonnier is controlled by around 75 descendants of three of Karl Otto Bonnier's six children, with the largest owners being Åke Bonnier and Jonas Bonnier.

== Time Inc. magazines acquisition ==
In January 2007, the Bonnier Magazine Group agreed to acquire 18 magazines that Time Inc. was divesting. The estimated price was US$225 million in cash and the assumption of about US$42 million in unfulfilled subscription liabilities (subscriptions already paid but not yet delivered.) The magazines in the package employed 550 people and included Outdoor Life, Popular Science, Field & Stream, Ski, Yachting, and Transworld Snowboarding, as well as 11 other titles that were part of Time Inc.'s Time4 Media Group. Also included were Parenting and Babytalk, which were part of the Parenting Group. That price was believed to be a multiple of about 11 times cash flow for a group that had net income of around US$20 million and revenue of around $230 million.

"We think we did a good deal, and we think Time did as well," said Jonas Bonnier, head of the Bonnier Magazine Group. Bonnier already had a small footprint in the US through a 50 percent stake in Winter Park, Florida-based World Publications, which owned the titles Islands and Spa, Saveur, Water Skiing, and Caribbean Travel & Life.
