= Bunder =

Obsolete unit of area in Belgium and the Netherlands

A bunder or bonnier is an obsolete unit of area previously used in the Low Countries (Belgium and the Netherlands).
