= Albert Bonniers Förlag =

Swedish publishing house

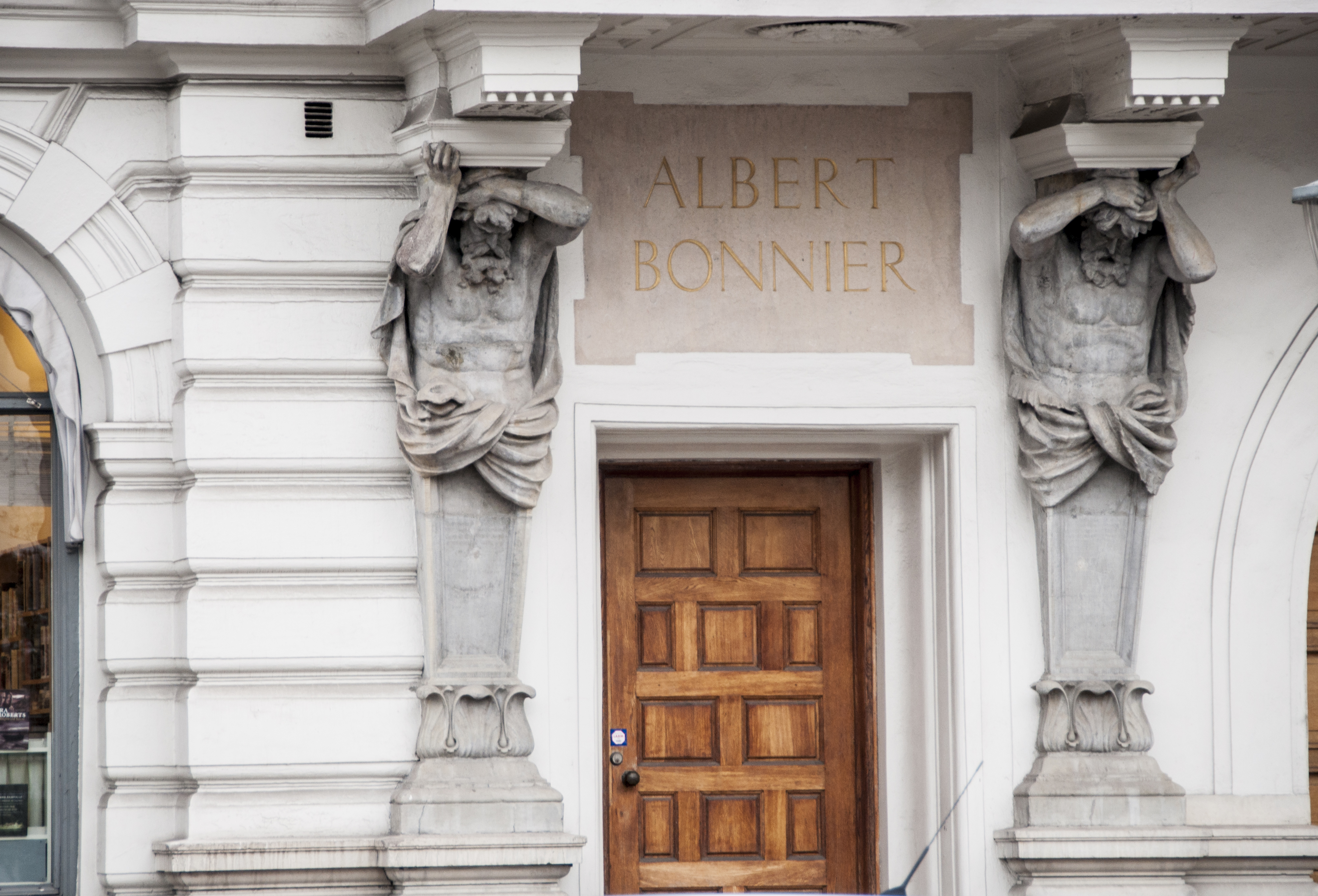
- Parent company: Bonnier Group
- Founded: 1837
- Founder: Albert Bonnier
- Country of origin: Sweden
- Headquarters location: Stockholm
- Publication types: Books
- Official website: Albert Bonniers Förlag

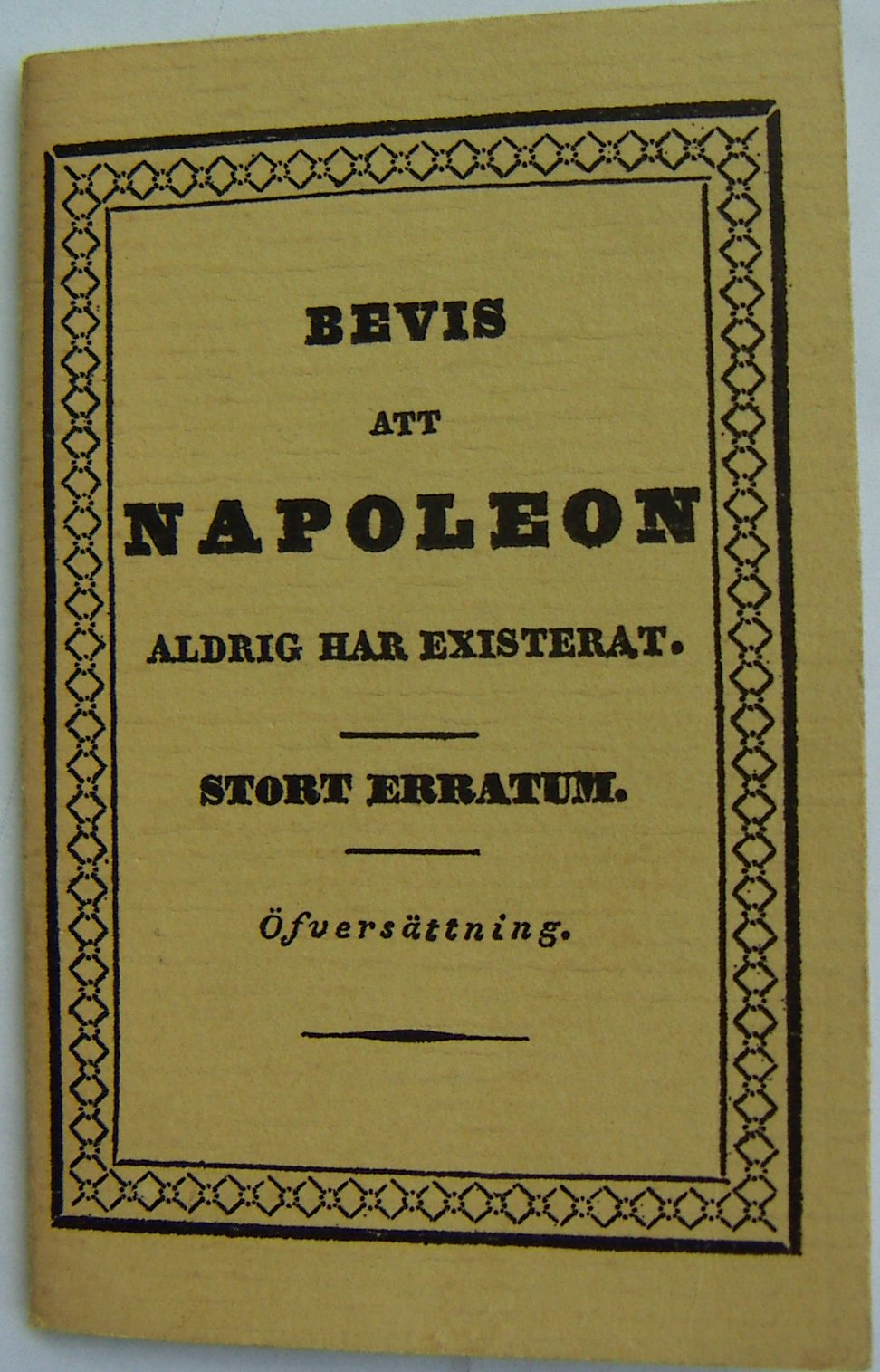
Bevis att Napoleon aldrig existerat, the first book published by Albert Bonnier (facsimile edition from 1962).

Albert Bonniers Förlag is a publishing company based in Stockholm, Sweden. Part of the book publishing house Bonnierförlagen, it also includes Wahlström & Widstrand and Bonnier Carlsen.

== History ==
Albert Bonnier (1820–1900) established the company in 1837 in Stockholm. The first book published was the satirical pamphlet Bevis att Napoleon aldrig har existerat. Under Albert Bonniers son and successor Karl Otto Bonnier (1856–1941) the company grew to be one of the largest publishers in Sweden. Many well-known Swedish authors have been published by Albert Bonniers Förlag. Notable authors in the 19th century included August Blanche, Zacharias Topelius and Viktor Rydberg. Later, Albert Bonniers Förlag was the publisher of the leading Swedish authors August Strindberg, Verner von Heidenstam, Gustaf Fröding, Selma Lagerlöf and Hjalmar Söderberg, and the next generation including Pär Lagerkvist, Vilhelm Moberg, Eyvind Johnson and Harry Martinson. The company was also a prolific publisher of non-fiction books and published magazines such as the literary magazine Bonniers Litterära Magasin, started in 1932.

Albert Bonniers Förlag publishes around 100 books per year. Its publications have been characterized by versatility, including novels, poetry, memoirs, biographies, essays and travelogues as well as a variety of non-fiction books. It is also a prolific publisher of translated works and have published numerous Nobel Prize in Literature laureates.

== See also ==
- Bonnier family
- Bonnier Group

== General and cited references ==
- Hermele, Bernt (2013). Firman: Bonnier - Sveriges mäktigaste mediesläkt. Stockholm: Leopard förlag. ISBN 9789173434096. OCLC 862715777.
