= Mag+ =

mag+
- Trade name: mag+
- Industry: Digital Publishing; Computer software
- Founded: 2011
- Headquarters: New York, United States
- Area served: Global
- Products: Digital Publishing Software
- Services: Digital Publishing
- Owner: MPS Limited
- Website: www.magplus.com

mag+ is a digital publishing platform to create content for tablets and smartphones.

== The platform ==
The mag+ digital publishing platform consists of a set of tools:

- The mag+ Plugin, a plugin to Adobe InDesign CS5 – CC 2019.
- The mag+ Feature Builder, a HTML-wizard for creating interactive elements.
- The mag+ Production, a content planning tool.
- The mag+ Reviewer, an iOS, Android & Kindle Fire app for reviewing the content created on the target device.
- The mag+ Publish, a web-based app building and app management tool.

== History ==
In 2009, Bonnier's Research and Development unit started a project to investigate how tablets will change the magazine industry.

In April 2010, Popular Science iPad App, created by the project team, was presented by Steve Jobs on stage during the launch of iOS 4 and the company began offering its software.

In January 2011, the company Moving Media+ AB was formally founded.

In September 2011, the company changed its name to mag+ AB in Sweden and to magplus Inc in the US. The name mag+ has since been used for the software. The name mag+ originate from Magazine and the + character represents an enhanced magazine experience enabled by the interactive multi media possibilities that tablets and smartphones offers, compared to print media.

As of June 2015, over 4,500 apps have been built on the mag+ platform.

In July 2016, MPS Limited acquired mag+.

== Owners ==
The company is owned by the publishing services company MPS Limited.

== Clients ==
Apps based on the platform:

- Bloomberg Markets
- British Journal of Photography
- Chicago Sun-Times
- I'm Zlatan
- Investment Week
- AnyFlip
- Macworld
- MAD Magazine
- Maxim
- Popular Photography
- Popular Science
- PUB Html5
- RedEye
- Symbolia
- The Next Web Magazine
- San Francisco Chronicle
- Slide Html5
- Victoria & Albert Museum
- Web MD
