= Albert Bonnier =

Swedish publisher (1820–1900)

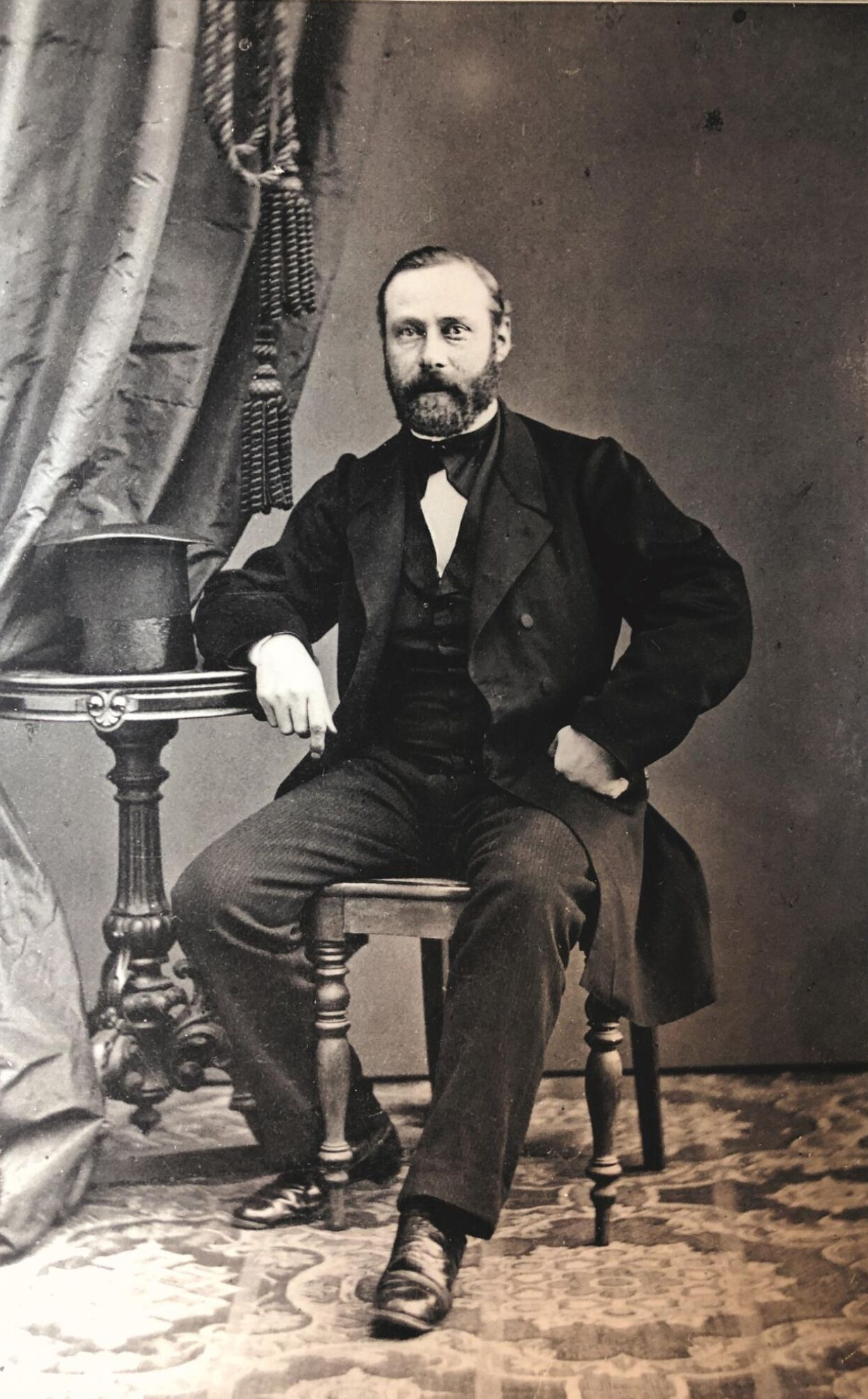
- Born: 21 October 1820; Copenhagen, Denmark
- Died: July 26, 1900 (aged 79); Stockholm, Sweden
- Citizenship: Swedish
- Occupation: Publisher
- Known for: Founder of Albert Bonniers förlag

Albert Bonnier (October 21, 1820, in Copenhagen – July 26, 1900, in Stockholm) was a Swedish book publisher and entrepreneur.

== Life ==
Albert Bonnier was the son of Gerhard Bonnier, a Jewish merchant and his wife Ester (née Elkan). Gerhard Bonnier was born in Dresden in 1778 as Gutkind Hirschel and later emigrated to Copenhagen. There he changed his name to Bonnier and founded a publishing house.

Bonnier's older brother Adolf was from 1827 in Gothenburg as a bookseller and moved two years later to Stockholm. Albert followed him and worked from 1839 to 1865 with his brother. In addition, he founded in 1837 a Förlagsbyrå, from 1858 as Albert Bonniers Förlag AB firmierte. The publishing house is today part of the resulting media Bonnier Group AB. For training purposes, he traveled from 1840 to two years to Leipzig, Vienna and Pest.

Albert Bonnier was married since 1854 with Betty Rubenson. Her daughter Eva Bonnier was a painter. Her son Karl Otto was also publisher and led from 1914 the father's company.

Bonnier edited and published the Stockholms Figaro between 1844 and 1847 and Sveriges Handelskalendar, which began in 1859.

== See also ==
- Bonnier family

== Literature ==
- Bonnier, Albert. In: Herman Hofberg, Frithiof Heurlin, Viktor Millqvist, Olof Rubenson (ed.): Svenskt biografiskt handlexikon. 2nd edition. Volume 1: A–K. Albert Bonniers Verlag, Stockholm 1906, p. 120 (Swedish, runeberg.org).
