= Jean-Baptiste Pérès =

French satirist and physicist (1752–1840)

- Born: 1752; Valence d'Agen, France
- Died: 1840 (aged 88)
- Occupations: Professor of mathematics and physics at the University of Lyon, later a government attorney and finally librarian at Agen

Jean-Baptiste Pérès (1752–1840) was a French physicist best known for his 1827 pamphlet Grand Erratum, a polemical satire, translated into many European languages, that attempted "in the interest of conservative theology, to reduce to an absurdity the purely negative tendencies of the rationalistic criticism of the Scriptures then in vogue" (as Frederick W. Loetscher described what he called "the celebrated pamphlet" in The Princeton Theological Review 1906) through humorously suggesting ways in which the history of Napoleon Bonaparte could be shown to be an expression of an ancient sun myth.

Pérès was professor of mathematics and physics at the University of Lyon, later a government attorney and finally librarian at Agen.

== Grand Erratum ==
The pamphlet's complete title in French was Comme quoi Napoléon n’a jamais existé ou Grand Erratum, source d'un nombre infini d'errata à noter dans l'histoire du XIX^{e} siècle ("It seems Napoleon never existed or Grand Erratum, source of an infinite number of errata as noted in the history of the 19th century").

The pamphlet's satire was directed at Charles François Dupuis (1742–1809) and his influential work Origine de tous les Cultes, ou la Réligion Universelle (1795), which attempted to prove that all religions were equally valid and based on common and universal imagery and magic numbers.

Pérès presents an overly rationalistic interpretation of the analogies and etymologies of elements in the popular understanding of Napoleon's life in order to show how, just as the Scriptures or other religious texts could be argued to be mythical, so could Napoleon's life.

=== Summary of the pamphlet ===
(The following summary is based on Sonnenfeld; see below. Direct quotations also come from Sonnenfeld.)

The name of Napoleon is suggested to be similar to that of the Ancient Greek sun god Apollo - the name supposedly from the verb apollyô or apoleô, "to exterminate" (the initial N in "Napoleon" could be derived from the Greek prefix nè or nai, "veritable"). Pérès derives the name from the event during the Trojan War when the Sun shone with unusual force, killing many of the Greek soldiers, as revenge for Agamemnon capturing Chryseis, the daughter of the priest of Apollo, Chryses. The family name Bona parte ("good part") could be seen as coming from a dualistic view of the good or light as one extreme, with mala parte ("bad part") being the opposite, darkness or hell (Pérès refers to the proclamation abi in malam partem, made by the priest during the ritual of exorcism).

Several other aspects of Napoleon's origin and family could also be cast as betraying supposedly mythological origins:

The location of Napoleon's birthplace, Corsica, in relation to France, corresponds to that of Delos, which is the mythical place of Apollo's birth, in relation to Greece.

Napoleon's mother's name was Letizia. The mother of Apollo was named Leto. Moreover, the name Letizia comes from the Latin word for joy, "and does not the dawn's light spread joy in nature when it opens the portals of the East to the sun?" (Sonnenfeld p 33). The three sisters of Napoleon could be seen as corresponding to the Three Graces of the court of Apollo. Napoleon's four brothers could be understood as the four seasons. Just as three of the seasons are kings (spring rules the flowers, summer the harvest, and autumn the fruit) dependent on the power of the sun, three of Napoleon's brothers reigned only thanks to his power. After the end of Napoleon's reign, the fourth brother is said to have received a principality near Canino, the name of which is derived from cani, "denoting the white hair of old age" (Sonnenfeld p 34). Napoleon's two wives are the barren moon (Joséphine) and the fertile earth (Marie Louise). His son was born on March 20, at the time of the vernal equinox.

Napoleon is seen as ending the French Revolution through being crowned Emperor. The word revolution comes from revolutus, "applied to a curled-up serpent" (Sonnenfeld p 35). This could be seen as analogous to Apollo's slaying of Python, which liberated the Greeks from terror.

Napoleon had at one time sixteen marshals, of which four were inactive which could be said to represent the twelve signs of the zodiac and the four fixed cardinal points.

Pérès also suggested that Napoleon could be said, like the sun, to have been militarily successful in the South but failed in the North. And just as the sun rises in the east, out of the sea to someone on the other side of the Atlantic, and sinks in the sea in the west, Napoleon could be seen as having come over the eastern sea from Egypt (where Apollo was said to have been originally worshipped) to rule France for twelve years, representing the twelve hours of the day, and then sank into the sea in the west (St. Helena).

In addition to these supposed mythological parallels, Pérès suggested that King Louis XVIII issued decrees in 1814 dated to the nineteenth year of his reign, which might be used to suggest that Napoleon could never have ruled France.
