= Åke Bonnier =

Swedish bishop (born 1957)

The Right Reverend Åke Bonnier
- Bishop of Skara
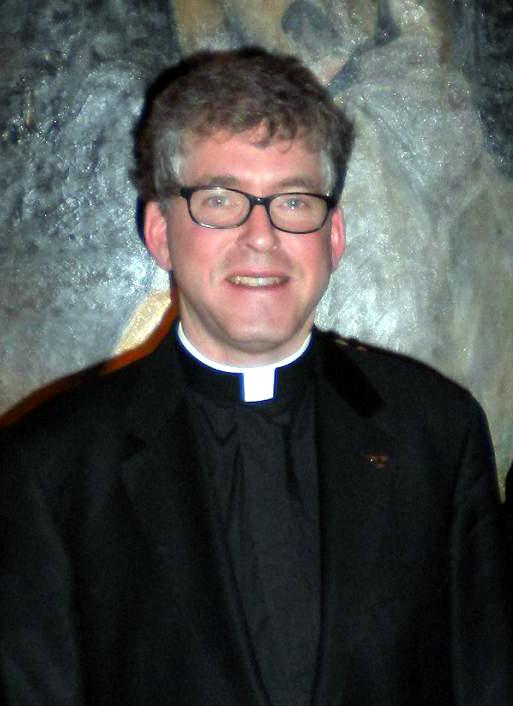
- Bonnier in 2009 in Stockholm
- Church: Church of Sweden
- Diocese: Skara
- Elected: 2012
- In office: 2012–2024
- Predecessor: Erik Aurelius
- Successor: Ulrica Fritzson
- Previous post: Dean of Stockholm Cathedral (2006-2012)

Orders
- Ordination: June 1984
- Consecration: 26 August 2012 by Anders Wejryd

Personal details
- Born: 11 December 1957 (age 68) Stockholm, Sweden
- Denomination: Lutheran
- Spouse: Kristina Gustafsson (since 1981)
- Children: Anna; Elin
- Motto: Ge Jesus äran
- Coat of arms

Åke Gabriel Bonnier (born 11 December 1957) is a member of the Bonnier family who was Bishop of Skara in the Church of Sweden from September 2012 to 2024. Through inheritance, he is a billionaire and the second largest owner of the Bonnier group.

== Early life ==
Bonnier was born and grew up in Stockholm where his father, Gerard Bonnier, belonged to the wealthy Bonnier family. His father was of partly Jewish descent and his mother was a member of the Church of Sweden, while his maternal grandmother converted from the Church of Sweden to Catholicism. He was baptised as child, but did not have a religious upbringing. His interest in Christianity started in his youth: he cites a book by Stockholm's bishop Ingmar Ström as an inspiration which led him choose to be confirmed in the Church of Sweden. He says of his wealth: "It is a great pleasure to belong to the Bonnier family, and at the same time a responsibility to have this money. The managerial responsibility is also an issue for us as Christians".

== Career ==
After having been involved in and leader of the Church's youth organisation Kyrkans unge and volunteering a year in Church of Sweden, he started studying theology and was ordained priest in Storkyrkan in 1984.

He subsequently held various pastoral positions in the Church of Sweden; from 1986 to 2006 in the Congregation of Lidingö. He served as dean of Stockholm from 2006 to 2009.

Bonnier was one of the officiants at the wedding of Crown Princess Victoria and Daniel Westling in 2009 and at the baptism of Princess Estelle.

He was ordained bishop by Archbishop Anders Wejryd in Uppsala Cathedral in August 2012. Crown Princess Victoria attended the ceremony.

Bonnier is on the Board of Directors of Gustavus Adolphus College in Minnesota. He also belongs to the Focolare Movement and has been chairman of the Friends of the Thiel Gallery.

== Views and theological profile ==
Bonnier has been a member of the Focolare Movement since 1988. He has attended Stockholm Pride and believes the LGBT movement should have a place in the church.

He became member of the leadership for the yearly march Jesusmanifestationen (English: The Jesus manifestation) in 2008, but left the leadership in 2009 citing concern about his participation among Evangelical Christians who had criticized him for defending the art exhibition Uppenbar(a)—which showed controversial art with Christian motives—and for being liberal on LGBT issues.

Having moved from Stockholm to Skara as a result of being appointed bishop, Bonnier criticized Swedish authorities in 2013 for discriminating against people outside large cities by providing insufficient public services and infrastructure in these areas and offering fewer jobs in the public sector there.

== Personal life ==
Åke Bonnier is married to Kristina Gustafsson Bonnier who is a social worker and has two daughters, one of which is Anna Rantala Bonnier. He is the second biggest owner of the Bonnier Group. He was listed by Veckans Affärer as the 64th richest man in Sweden in 2012 with a fortune of 2.1 billion Swedish kronor (US$345 million as of January 2014). His siblings Eva, Pontus, and Karl-Otto Bonnier, have top positions in the Bonnier group.

== Recognition ==
- Knight of the Order of St. Gregory the Great (2008)
