= Sobědruhy =

Coordinates: 50°39′51″N 13°51′25″E

- Interactive map of Sobědruhy
- Country: Czech Republic

Sobědruhy (German: Soborten) is an administrative part of the city of Teplice in the Czech Republic.

== Geography ==
Sobědruhý lies about 225 meters (738 ft) above sea level. The highest point is about 285 meters (935 ft) above sea level.

== History ==
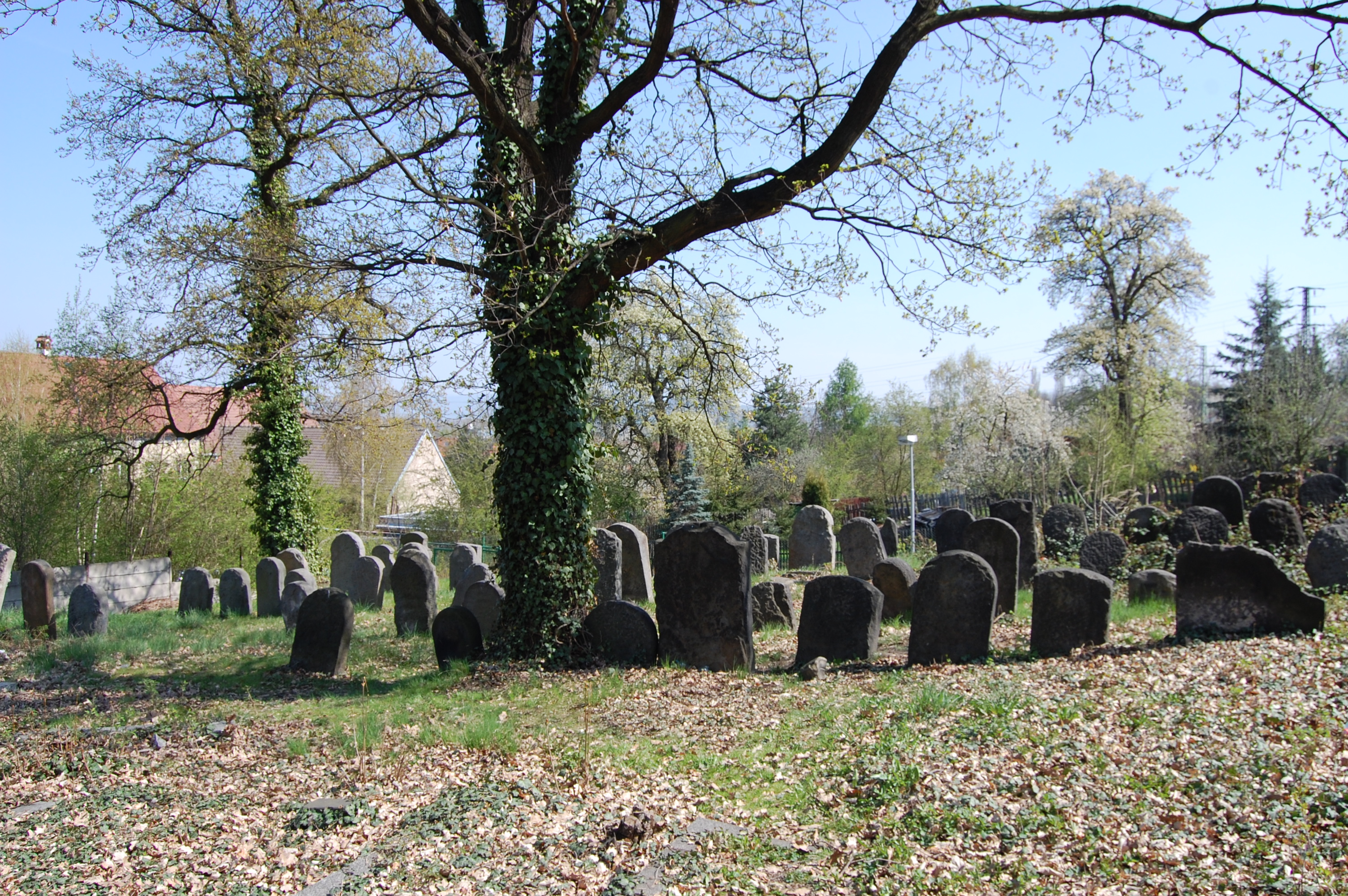
Jewish cemetery at Sobědruhy

Traditionally, Sobědruhy was a town in Bohemia, whose Jewish community is probably one of the oldest in the province. The Jewish community of Sobědruhy includes parts of the Teplitz (Teplice), Dux (Duchcov), and Karbitz (Chabařovice) districts. The synagogue has a tower, with a clock, and two lamps respectively bearing the dates 1553 and 1654. For a time the Jewish cemetery at Sobědruhy was used as a burial-place by the Jewish community of Dresden. Many gravestones bear the inscription "Mi-Geresh Prag", marking the graves of Jews who were driven from Prague, some of whom died as martyrs. Until 1848 the Jews of Sobědruhy were confined to the ghetto. For some time the Jewish community formed a part of the Litoměřice district rabbinate, but in 1883 it gained independence and elected as its rabbi Heinrich Galandauer.

== Notable people ==
- Dušan Třeštík
- Bonnier family
