= Bonnier family =

Swedish family

Bonnier
- Current region: Sweden
- Origin: Sobědruhy (Soborten) in Bohemia (now in Czech Republic)
- Traditions: Judaism, Christianity
- Estate: Sweden

The Bonnier family is a Swedish family, originally of German Jewish descent, who since the beginning of the 19th century has been active in the book industry and later also in the mass media industry. They own the media group Bonnier Group, with the largest owners being Åke Bonnier and Jonas Bonnier. The group has 175 companies in 18 countries.

== History ==
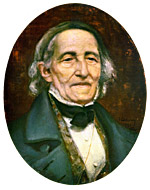
Gerhard Bonnier.

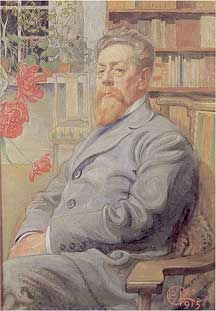
Karl Otto Bonnier

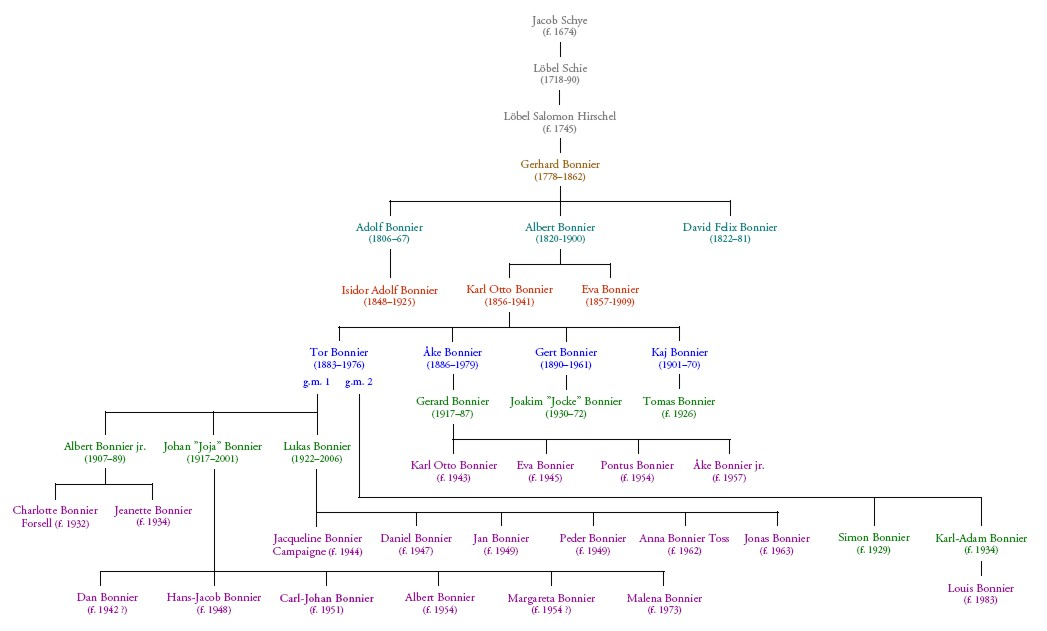
A family tree with some of Gerhard Bonnier's descendants.

The earliest known member of the patriarchal line of the family was a cloth salesman named Jacob Schye (born 1674), who was from the town of Sobědruhy (Soborten) in Bohemia (now in the Czech Republic). His son, the jeweler Löbel Schie (1718–1790), fathered the jeweler and coin dealer Löbel Salomon Hirschel (born 1745). Hirschel's son, Gutkind Hirschel (1778–1862), moved from Germany to Copenhagen, Denmark, in 1801 and changed his name to Gerhard Bonnier. There, Gerhard started a small book store in 1804.

Gerhard's oldest son, Adolf Bonnier (1806–1867), moved to Gothenburg, Sweden, in 1827 to expand the family business. He started a library in the city the following year and another one in Stockholm a few years after. Adolf Bonnier started a publishing company, Albert Bonniers Förlag in 1837 and his two younger brothers, David Felix Bonnier (1822–1881) and Albert Bonnier (1820–1900), soon moved to Stockholm to help with the business.

== Notable members ==
- Gerhard Bonnier (1778–1862), book seller
- Albert Bonnier (1820–1900), publisher
- Eva Bonnier (1855–1907), painter
- Karl Otto Bonnier (1856–1941), publisher
- Tor Bonnier (1883–1976), publisher
- Åke Bonnier (1886–1979), publisher
- Albert Bonnier Jr. (1907–1989), publisher
- Joakim Bonnier (1930–1972), Formula One driver
- Lukas Bonnier (1922–2006), publisher
- Åke Bonnier (born 1957), bishop in the Diocese of Skara, today the second largest owner of the Bonnier Group.
- Jonas Bonnier (born 1963), novelist, businessman
- Tor Bonnier (designer) (born 1966), designer
- Martina Bonnier (born 1966), journalist, editor-in-chief of Vogue Scandinavia
- Karl-Adam Bonnier (born 1934), entrepreneur
- Anna Rantala Bonnier (born 1983), Social worker and politician for Feminist Initiative.

=== Gallery ===
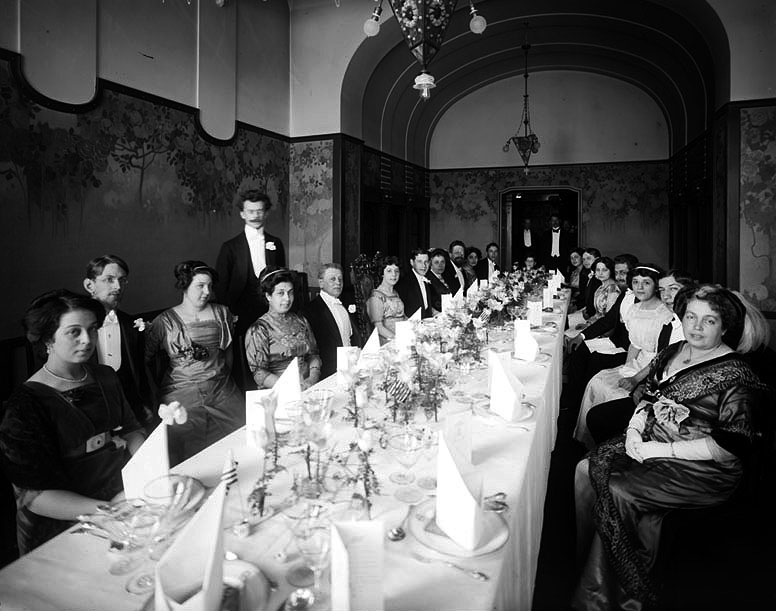
A Bonnier family dinner in Stockholm, 1910.

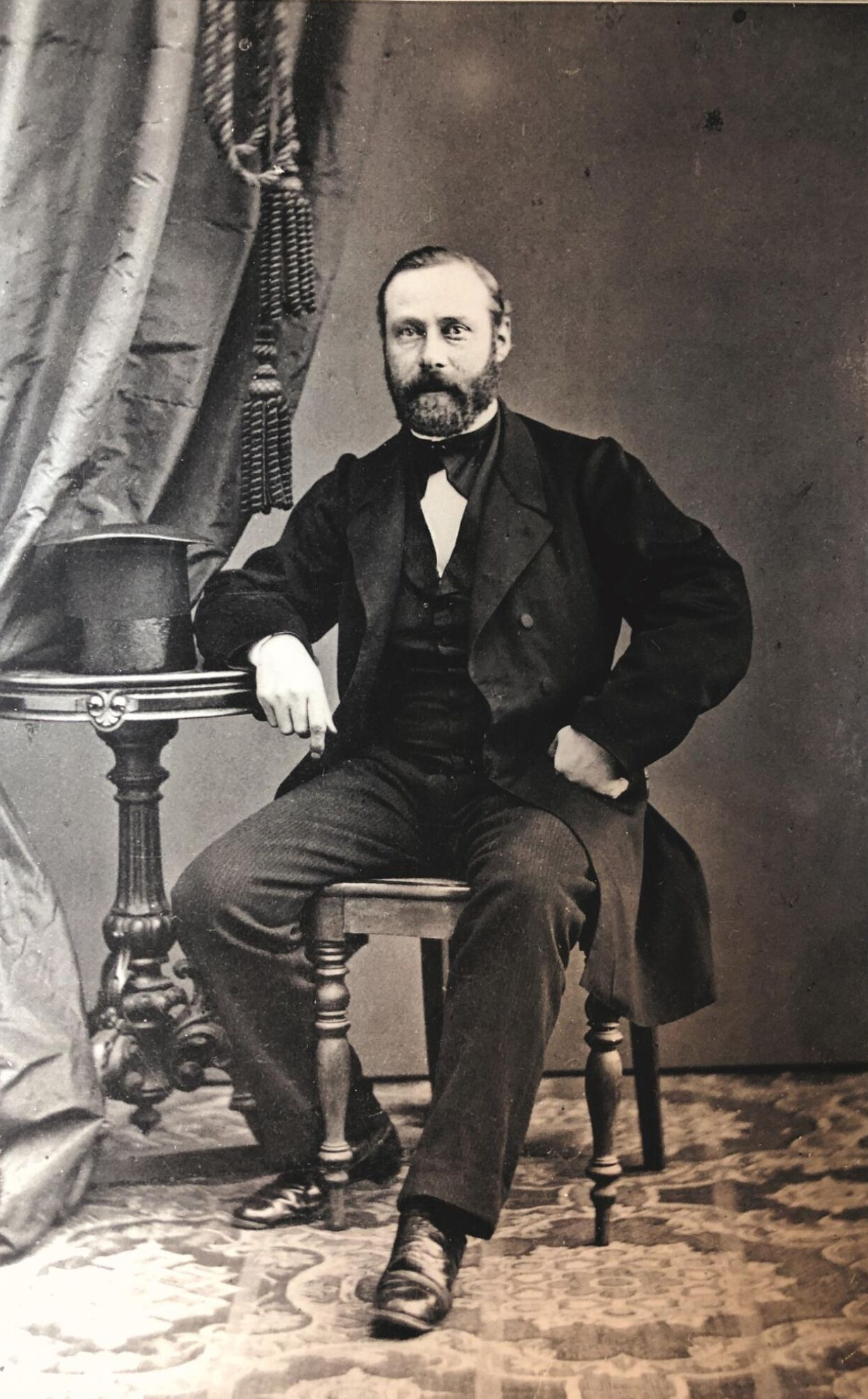
Albert Bonnier, 1854.

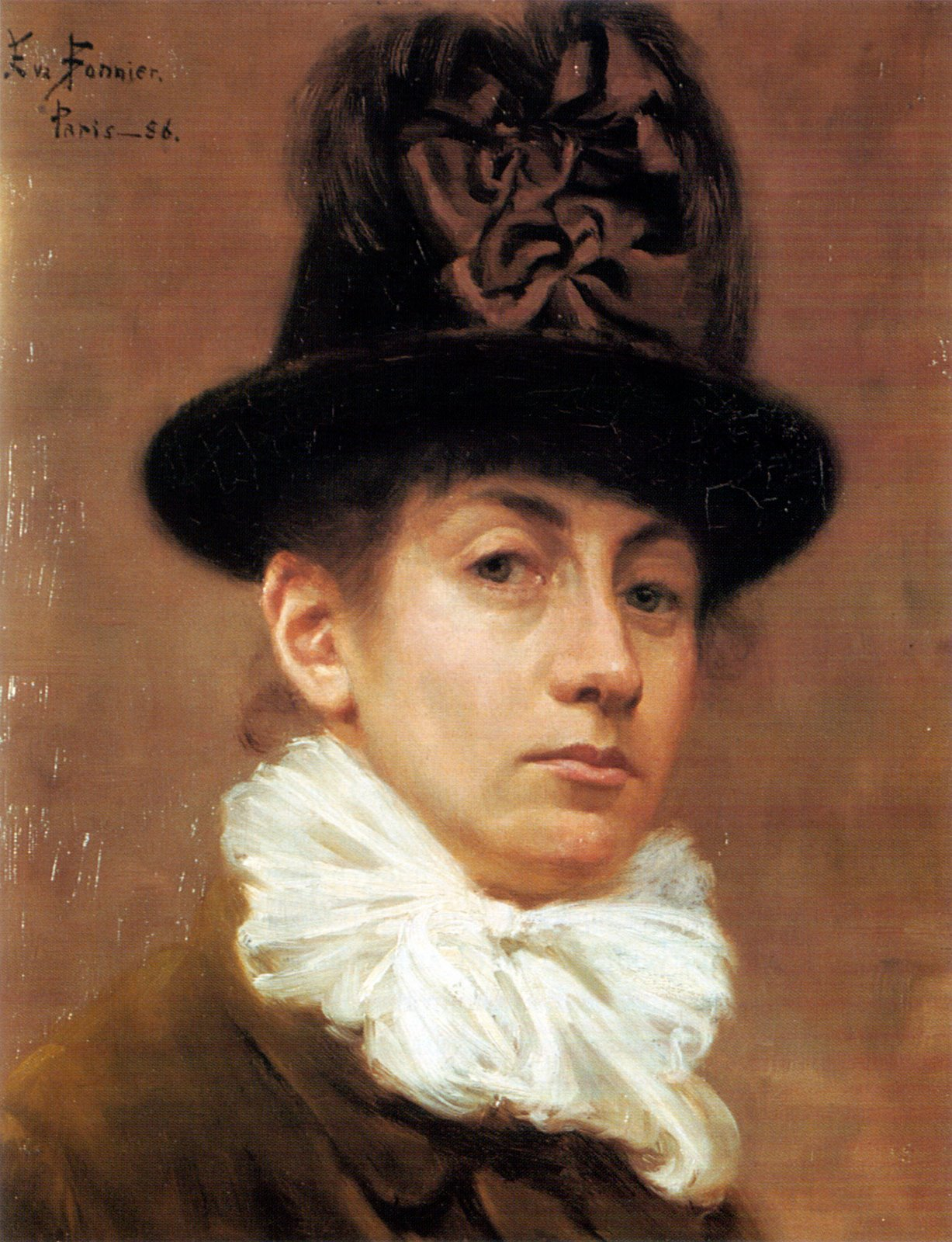
Eva Bonnier, 1886.

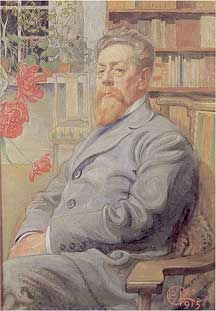
Karl Otto Bonnier, 1915.

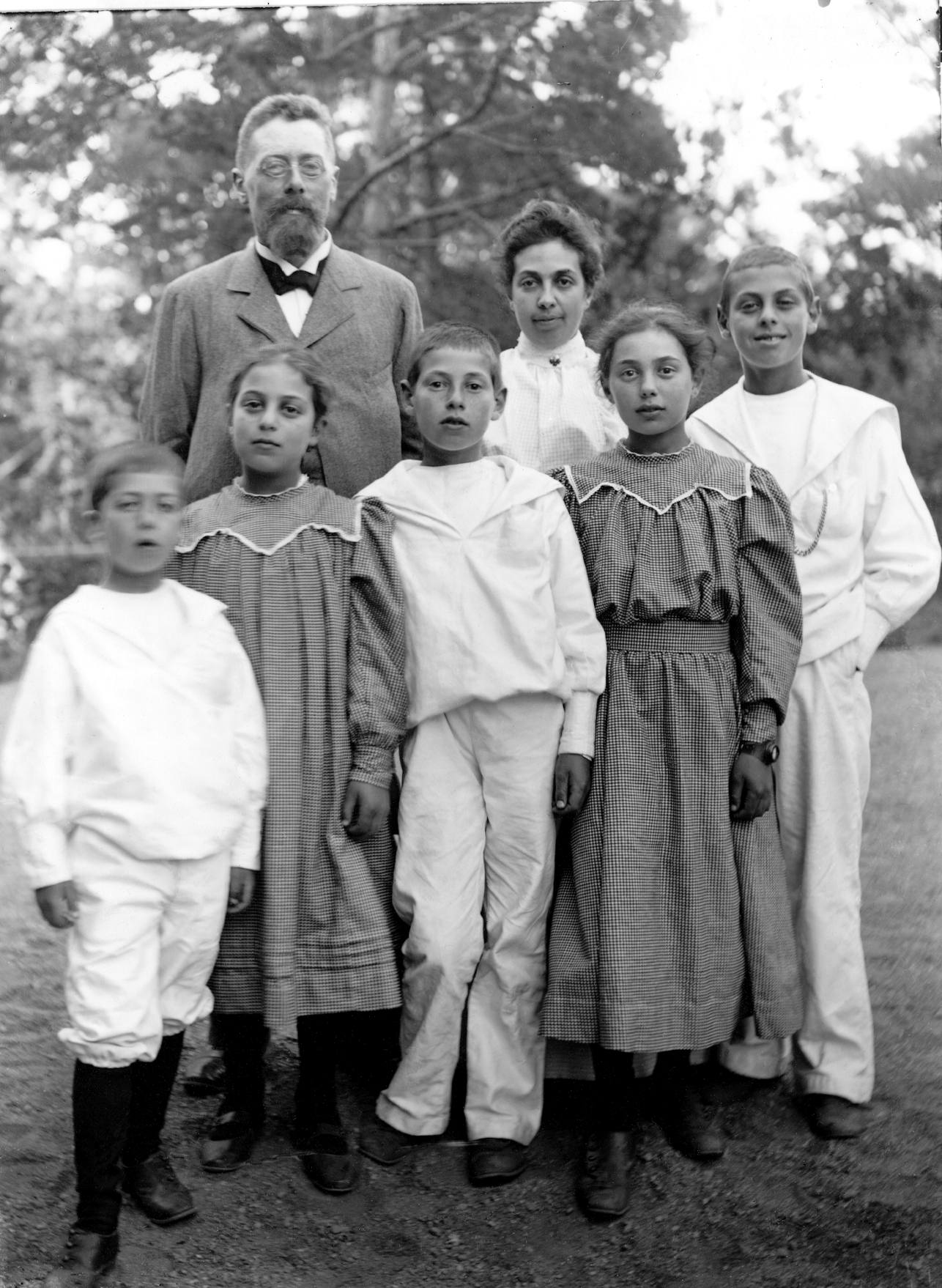
Karl Otto with his wife and children, 1890s.

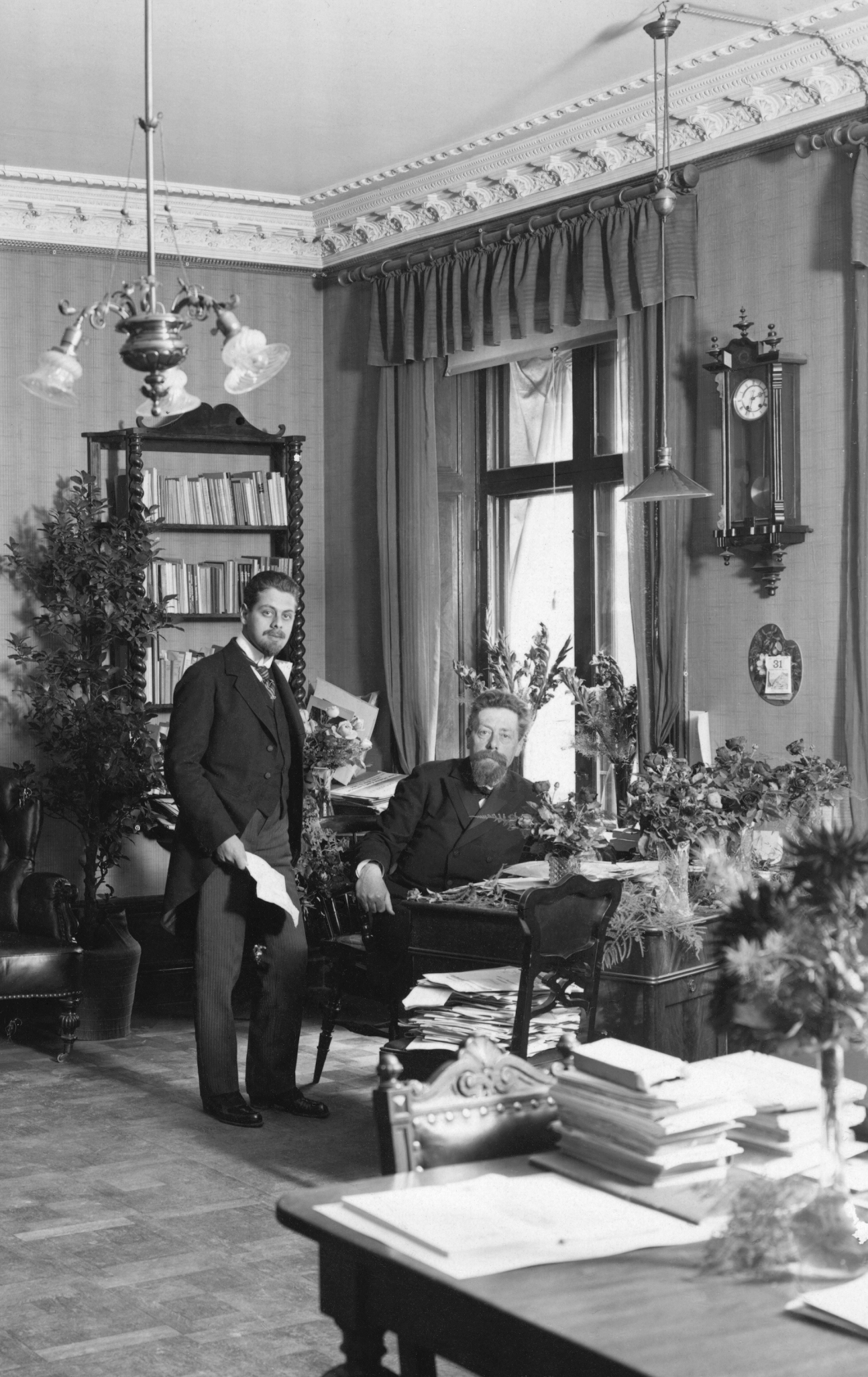
Tor Bonnier and Karl Otto celebrating the 75th birthday of Albert Bonniers Förlag, 1912.

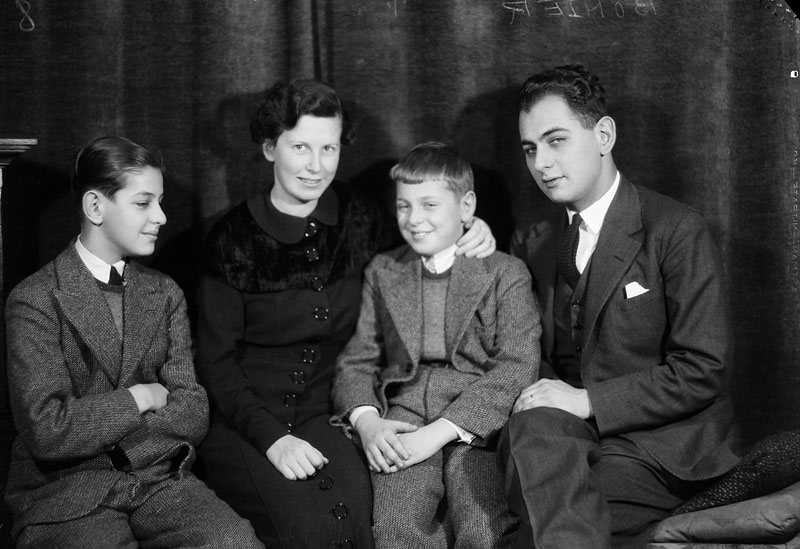
Albert Bonnier Jr. with his wife and brothers, 1930.

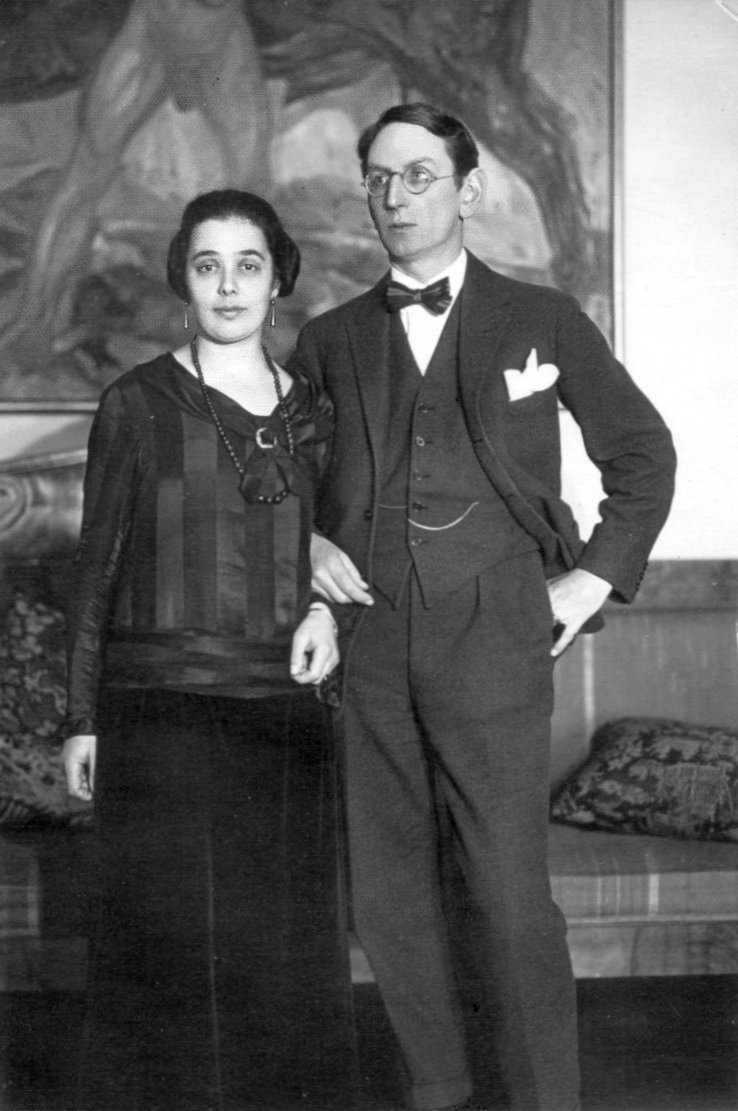
Elin (1884–1980) and Yngve Larsson, 1925.

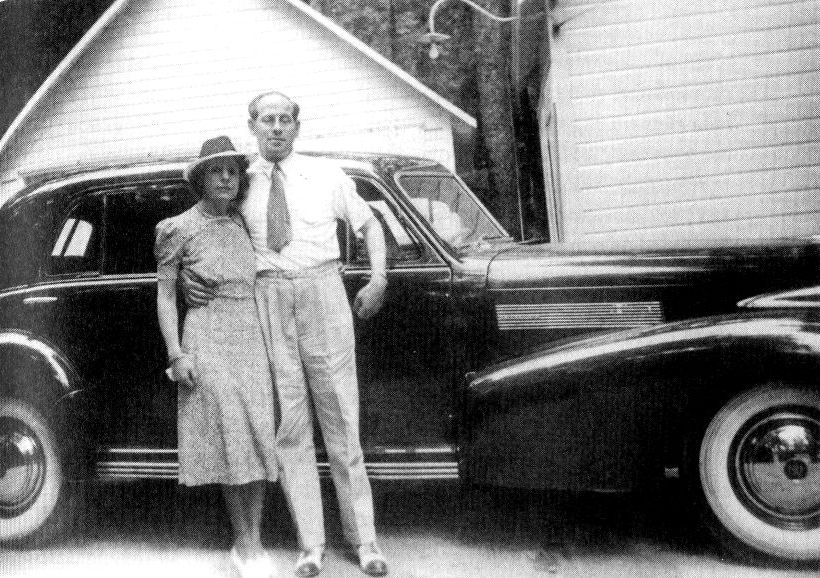
Eva (1888–1977) and Åke Bonnier (1886–1979), c. 1930s.

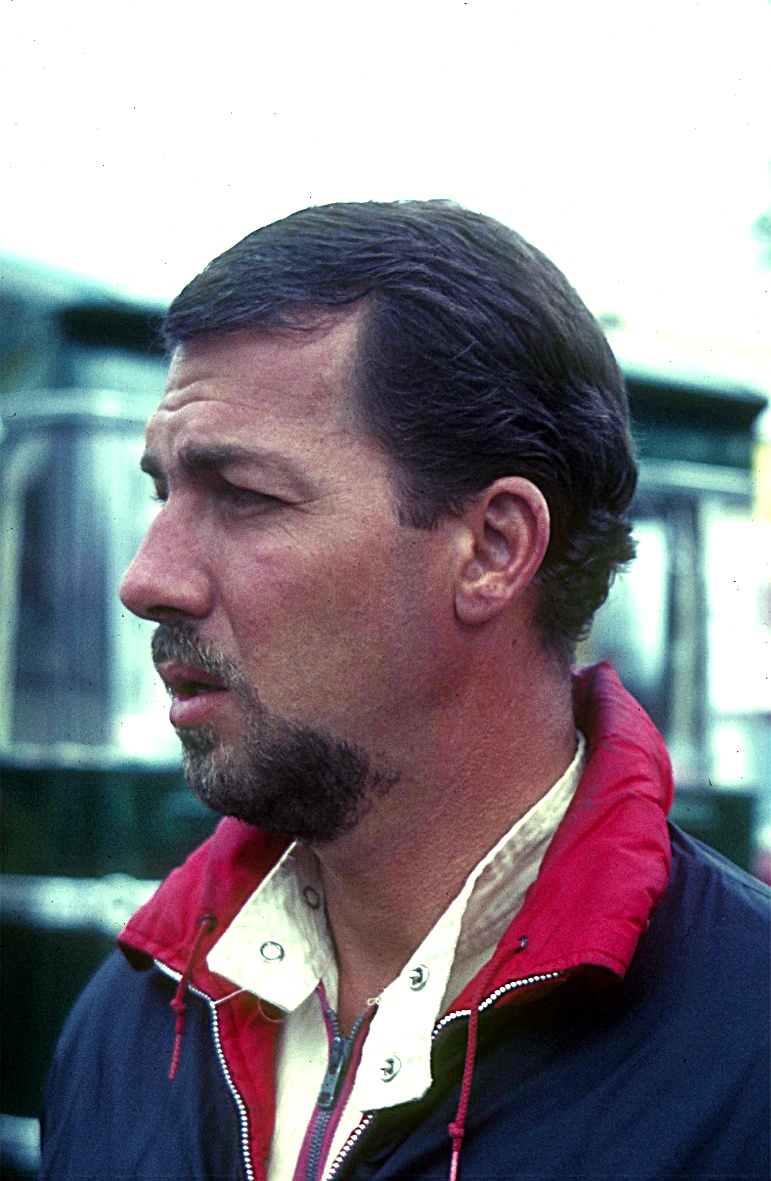
Joakim Bonnier, 1966.

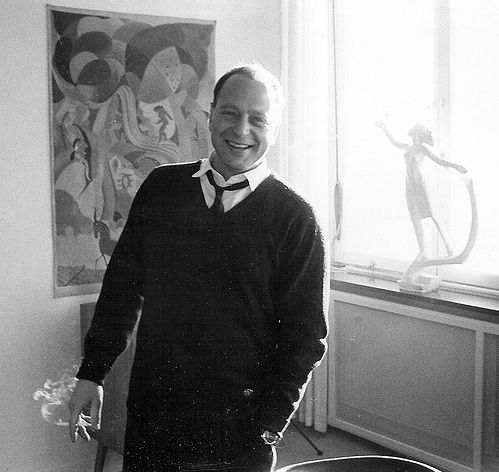
Lukas Bonnier, early 1960s.

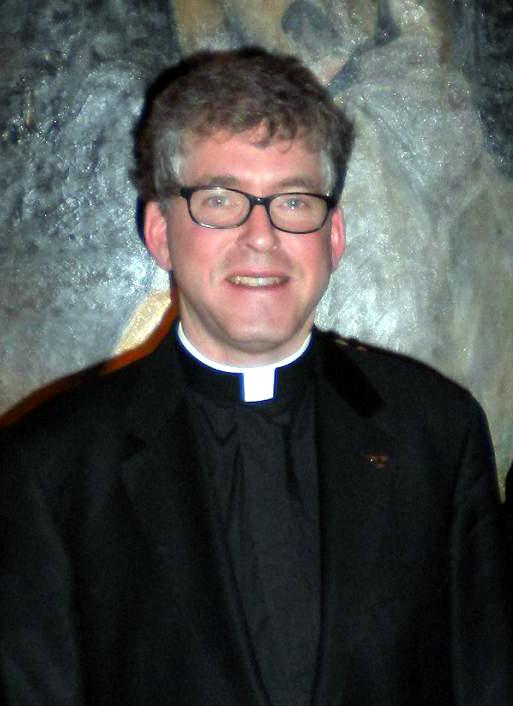
Åke Bonnier, bishop in the Diocese of Skara.

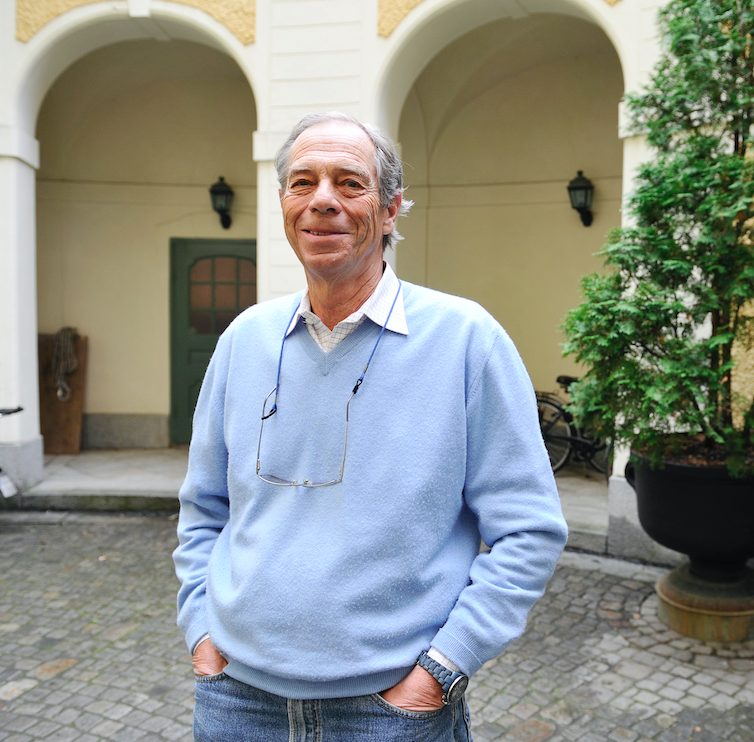
Karl-Adam Bonnier, 2015.

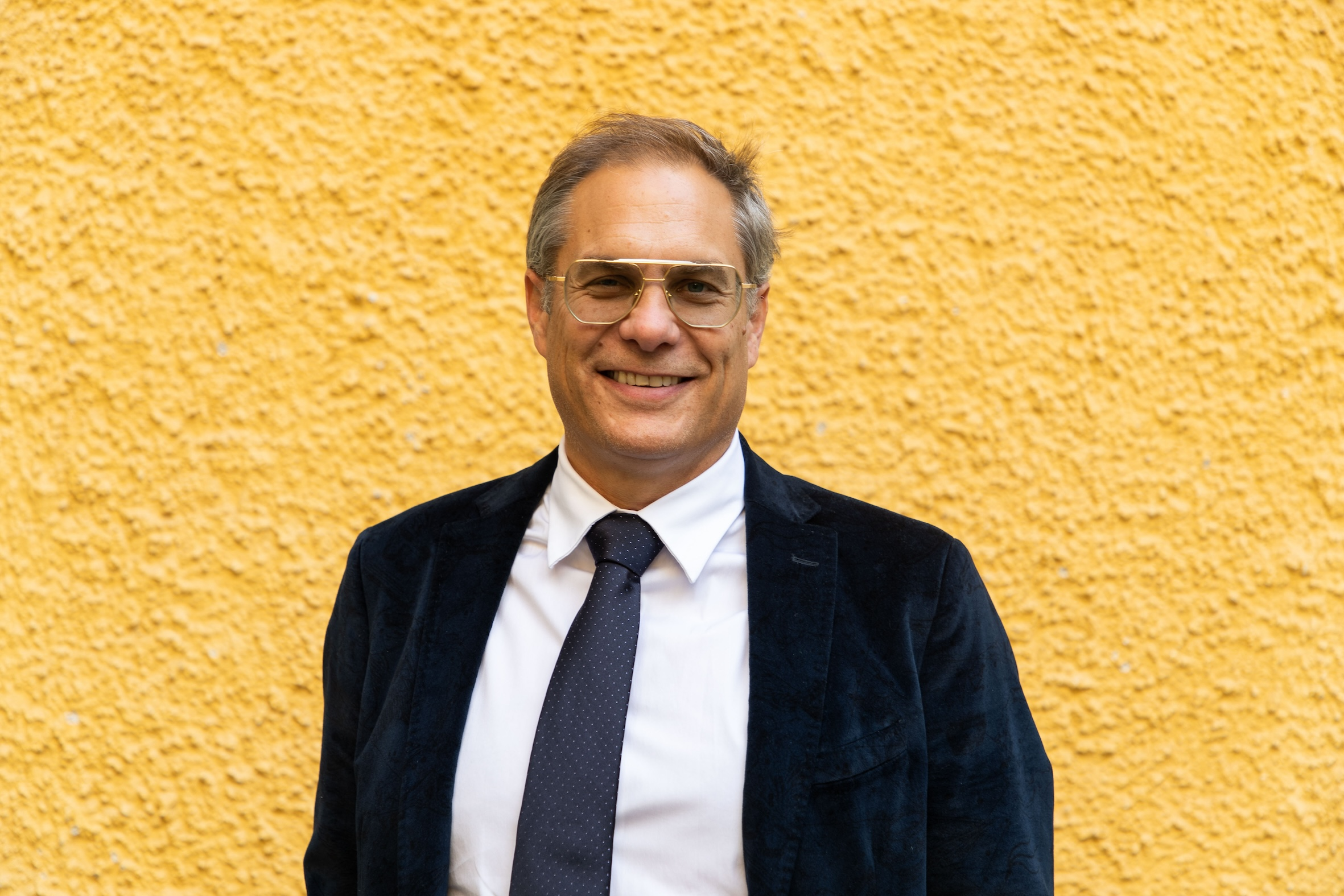
Tor Bonnier, 2024.
