= Tor Bonnier (designer) =

Swedish designer

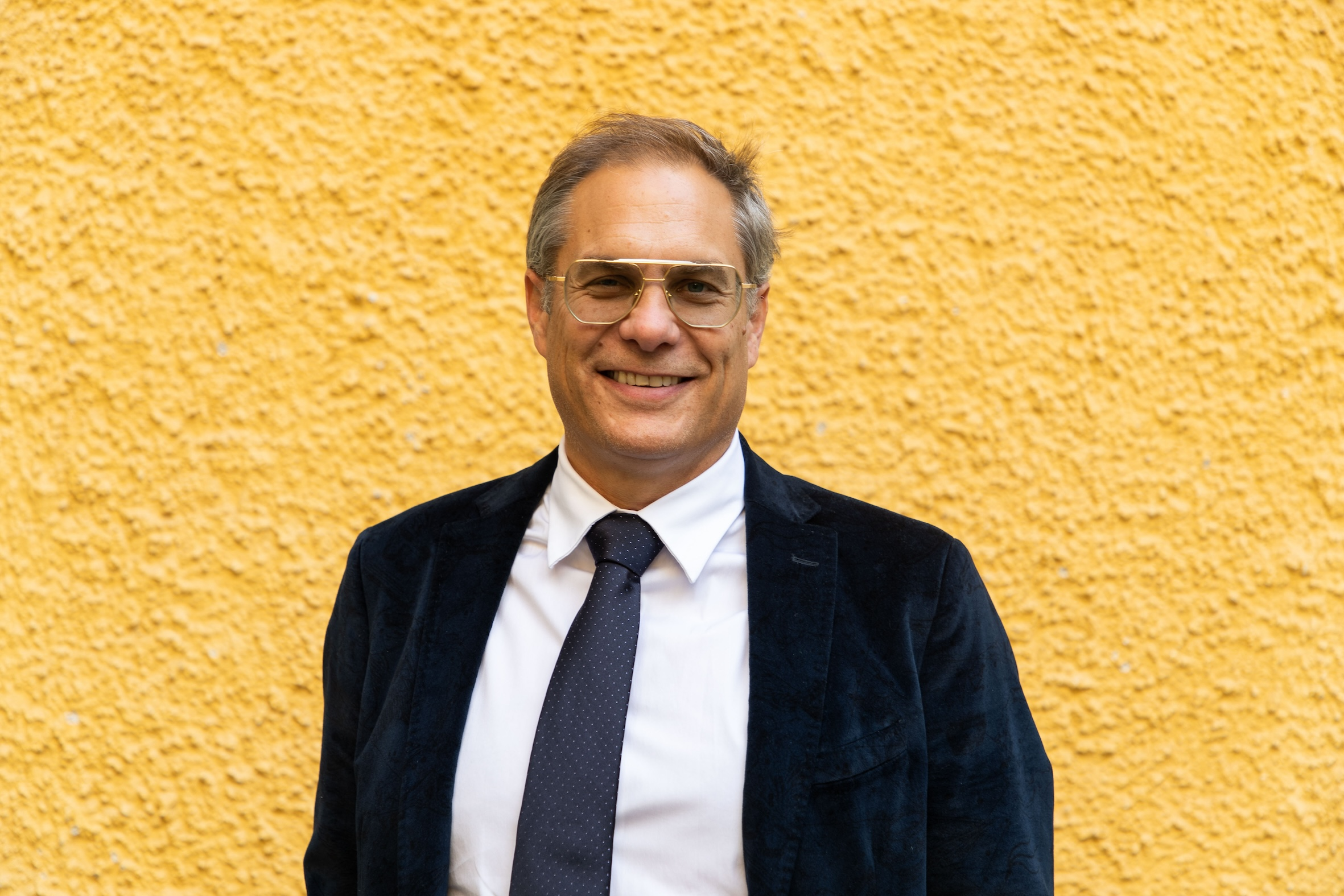
- Tor Bonnier, 2024
- Born: Tor Gabriel Bonnier; September 5, 1966 (age 60); Stockholm, Sweden
- Occupation: Designer
- Spouse: Lisa Bonnier
- Parent(s): Karl-Adam Bonnier; Lena Lindqwister

Tor Gabriel Bonnier (born 5 September 1966) is a Swedish designer and foundation executive. His work has included industrial design projects as well as initiatives supporting research in governance and public policy at the Stockholm School of Economics.

== Early life and education ==
Bonnier was born in Stockholm. During his upbringing he spent periods in the United States, where he attended Charlottesville High School in Virginia. He later studied design at the Rhode Island School of Design.

He returned to Sweden in 1995 and has since lived and worked in Stockholm.

== Career ==
Bonnier began his career as a designer in the United States, working at Design Continuum and Henry Dreyfuss Associates.

After returning to Sweden he founded the design company Reload AB, where he was chief executive officer between 2000 and 2015.

Bonnier has been a board member of the Bonnier Family Foundation, The Bonnier Family Foundation for Scientific Research and Education, as well as previously holding board positions in Albert Bonnier AB and the Bonnier Family Council. He has been featured in the Financial Times in coverage related to family-owned businesses and has also participated as a speaker at international events on family business and governance, including in Madrid at the IESE ECGI Corporate Governance Conference. In addition he was a board member of Family Business Network Sweden, an organisation working with governance and succession issues in family-owned companies.

Bonnier has also held several leadership roles in the Karl-Adam Bonnier Foundation, including positions as board member and chairman, and became the foundation’s chief executive officer in 2025.

Through the foundation he contributed to the establishment of research initiatives at the Stockholm School of Economics, including the research collaboration House of Governance and Public Policy, the Karl-Adam Bonnier Center for Governance and the K-A Bonnier International Fellows Program.

== Design work ==
Bonnier has worked on industrial design projects including telecommunications equipment and consumer products.

Several products designed by Bonnier for Ericsson are included in the industrial design collection of Nationalmuseum in Stockholm.

== Awards ==
In 2002, Bonnier received the Excellent Swedish Design award for the satellite communications equipment IPT Suitcase, designed together with Lars Hofsjö at Reload Design.

In 2007, he received the Grand Award of Design for work on a design strategy for DeLaval’s milking products.

In 2020, he received the SIR Research Award from the Stockholm School of Economics for his support of research.
