= Karl Otto Bonnier =

Swedish publisher (1856–1941)

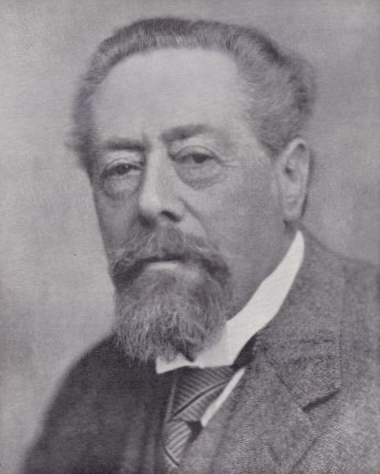
- Born: 20 June 1856; Stockholm, Sweden
- Died: 26 May 1941 (aged 84); Stockholm, Sweden
- Occupation: Publisher
- Known for: Albert Bonniers förlag
- Parent: Albert Bonnier

Karl Otto Bonnier (20 June 1856 – 26 May 1941) was a Swedish publisher for authors including August Strindberg, Verner von Heidenstam, Gustaf Fröding, Selma Lagerlöf, and Hjalmar Söderberg. He was the son of the founder of the family company, Albert Bonnier.

== See also ==
- Bonnier family
