= Ange-Élisabeth-Louis-Antoine Bonnier =

French diplomat

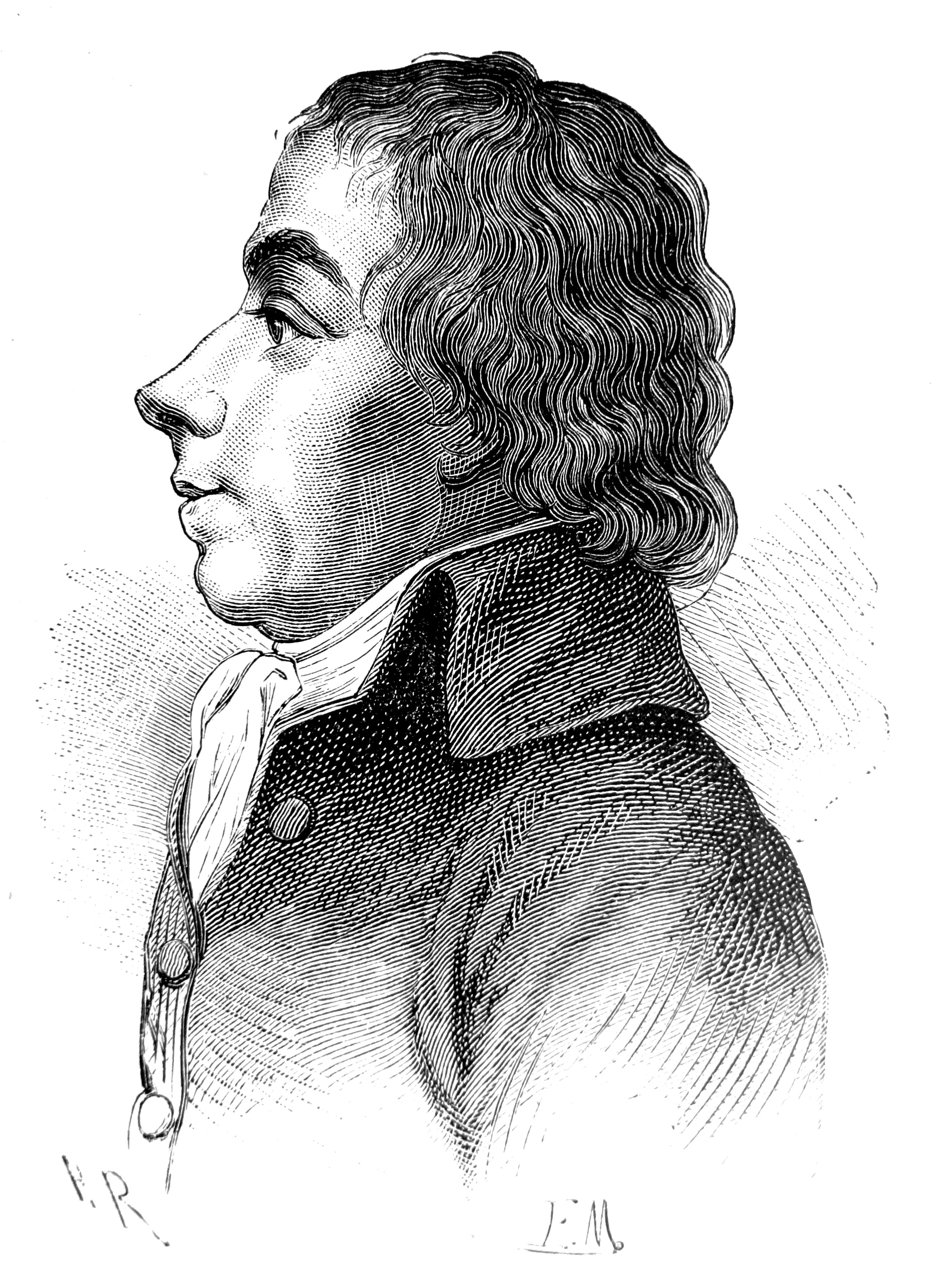
Bonnier d'Alco (Album du Centenaire)

Ange-Élisabeth-Louis-Antoine Bonnier d'Alco (1750 in Montpellier – 28 April 1799) was a French diplomat during the French Revolution.

A representative of Hérault in the Legislative Assembly and of the National Convention, he generally voted with the majority. Bonnier voted for the execution of Louis XVI. He was a friend of Jean-François Rewbell and therefore was entrusted with various diplomatic missions, including to Lille to negotiate with Lord Malmesbury in October 1797 and to Rastadt in 1799 to negotiate with the congress. Negotiations at the latter went slowly and on 28 April, Bonnier, Claude Roberjot and Jean Debry were attacked by Hungarian hussars as they left the town, probably in an attempt to steal their papers. Debry was wounded, but Bonnier and Roberjot were killed.
