= Jonas Bonnier =

Swedish author

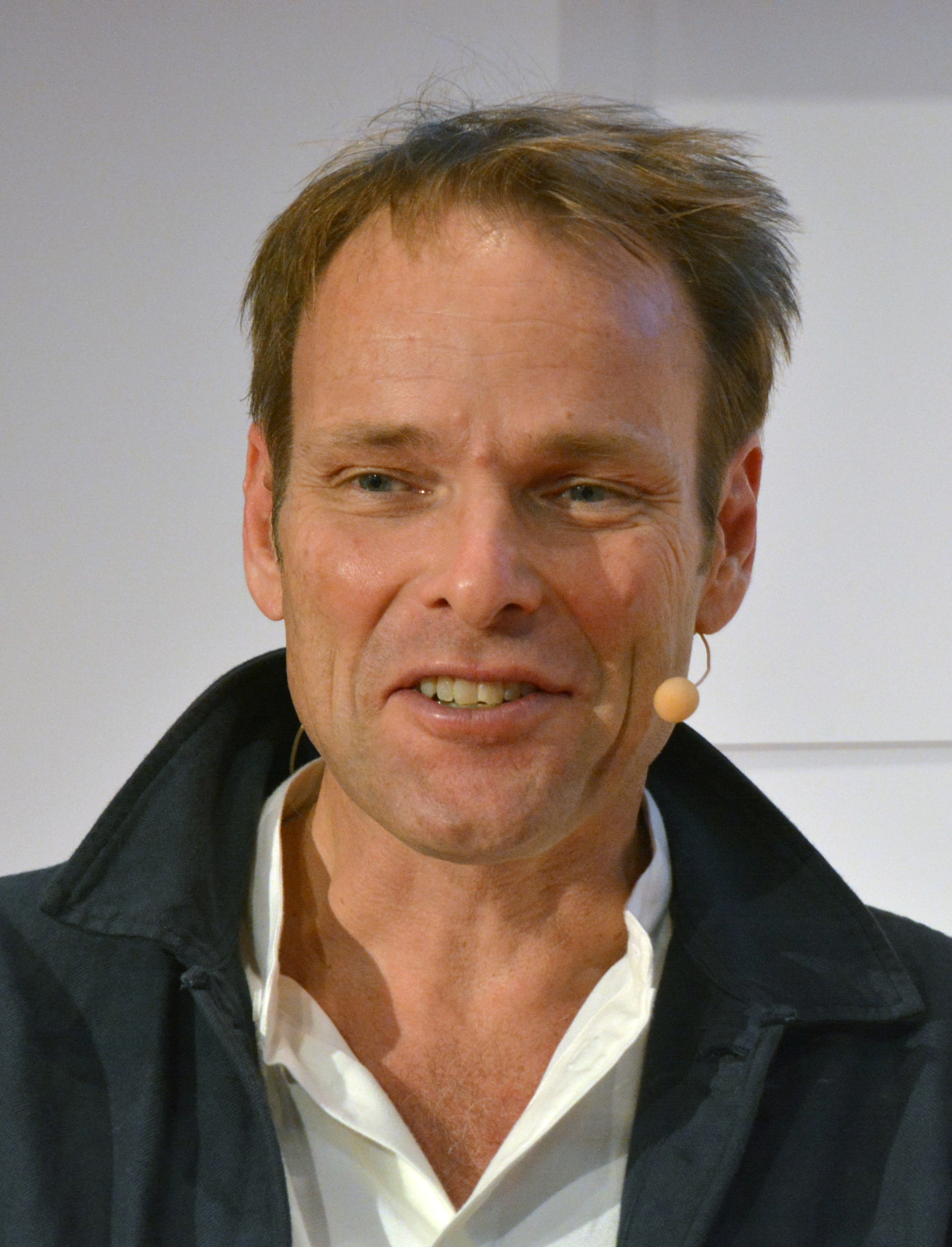
- Born: 1963 (age 62–63)
- Occupations: Author, businessman
- Notable work: The Helicopter Heist
- Title: President and CEO of the Bonnier Group
- Term: 2008–2013
- Predecessor: Bengt Braun
- Successor: Tomas Franzén
- Relatives: Bonnier family

Jonas Bonnier (born 1963) is a Swedish author who has published 8 novels. His latest work, The Helicopter Heist about the Västberga helicopter robbery, has been sold to 34 territories. It is his first attempt in the suspense novel category. The film- and TV-rights were acquired by Netflix and Jake Gyllenhaal's production company Nine Stories. Bonnier was President of the Bonnier Group from 1 January 2008 until May 2013. He is a member of the Bonnier family.
