= 1920–1921 Chicago rent strikes =

Historical event

1920-21 Chicago rent strikes
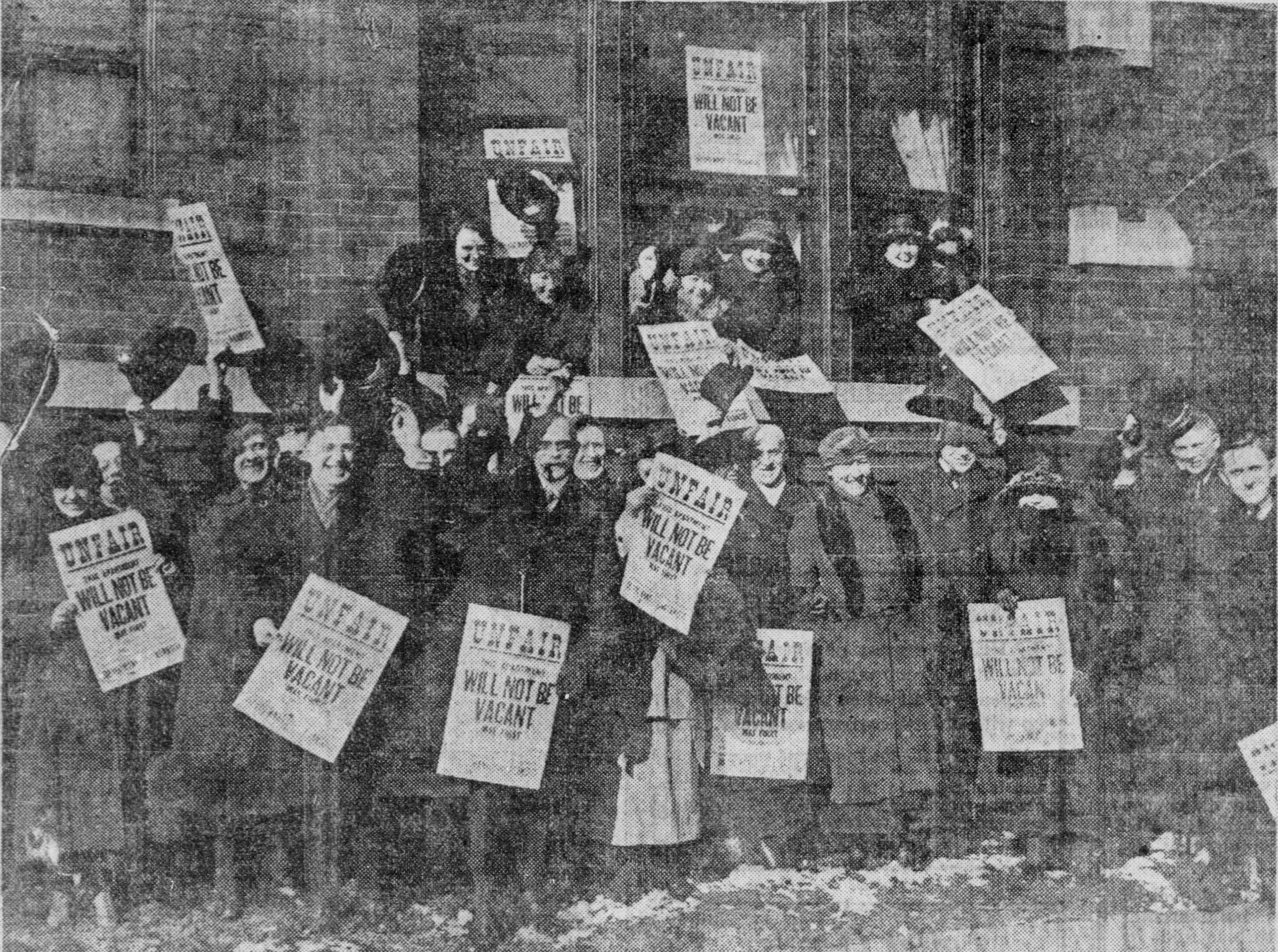
- Tenants at 4706-32 Racine avenue and others give a demonstration against rent boosting, March 1920 Signs read: "Unfair. This apartment will not vacate May 1. Agent of landlord demands 86 to 100 per cent advance in rent. Do you want to buy a lawyer?"
- Date: 1920–1921
- Location: Chicago, Illinois
- Caused by: Rent increases and housing shortage
- Goals: Rent reversals or decreases; Tenant power and protections; Apartment heating
- Methods: Rent strike; Picketing; Solidarity actions
- Result: Minor tenant union victory: Rent reversals or decreases; Passage of new tenant eviction protections; Heat code for apartment buildings; Kessinger laws

Parties
Tenants; Chicago Tenants Protective Association; 1919 Chicago Tenants Protective League (CTPL); 1920–? Racine Avenue Tenants Association Rogers Park Protective Association (RPTPA) Edgewater Protective Association Wilson Avenue Tenants' Association Woodlawn Tenants' Association: Chicago Building Trades Council; Chicago Federation of Labor	Landlords; Lake View Property Owners & Improvement Association: Realtors; Chicago Real Estate Board (CREB): Police; Magistrate

Number
1920: ~10,000 tenants; 1921: ~20,000 tenants	

Casualties and losses
Evictions	

The 1920–1921 Chicago rent strikes were a series of tenant mobilizations against rent increases and landlords following an acute housing crisis in the city. It was likely in part inspired by the tactics of the 1918–1920 New York City rent strikes.

The rent strikes were also characterized by a then ongoing open shop movement by employers to break up unions, with a focus on the building trades, utilizing the housing crisis to call for a decrease in their wages.

By its end the strikes in Chicago won tenants the right to a trial by jury, the right for judges to give tenants a six-month delay in rent increases and led to the institution of a minimum heat requirement for apartments during winter months. Many tenants also individually won decreases in rent with their landlords after going on rent strike and negotiating with their landlord.

== Background ==
Prior to the 1920–21 Chicago rent strikes, Chicago was experiencing an acute cost of living crisis as a result of World War 1 manufacturing mobilization towards war industries. It caused supply shortages and a particularly acute housing crisis as the building industries redirected to war manufacturing. The city was also undergoing rapid industrialization as workers moved there for the war industries further limiting housing supply; From 1910 to 1920 Chicago's population grew by 20%.

From 1914 to 1919 the cost of housing in Chicago increased by 14%. While the general cost of living roughly doubled in that same period. However the most acute crisis would occur from 1919 to 1921. Where from December 1919 to December 1921, housing costs in Chicago increased 62%, while the general cost of living actually slightly decreased.

Among Chicago tenants several other housing issues precipitated organizing. Notably for middle class tenants, landlords' discrimination against those with children became a sticking point, with landlords becoming more stringent as the housing shortage gave them more leverage and power.

Another aspect of contention was heating. At the time a nationwide coal shortage was occurring due both to the after effects of WW1 mobilization toward wartime industry. A particular harsh winter from 1917 to 1918 also heavily affected tenants, with some landlords stopping their providing of coal and heat in the case of central heating.

While this crisis reduced, landlords not providing heat was still a problem in later years and thus became an important demand by Chicagoan tenants.

=== Middle class self-identity, the American plan, and labor ===
The rent strikes in Chicago were partially defined by a self identification as a 'middle class'. Particularly defined by the idea of white collar living, and a racialized identity, as white exclusive.

This framework was in part encouraged by the conservative 'citizens committees' set up around the country by the American 'open shop' plan by employers, placing the blame of the high cost of living, on organized labor, in order to break apart the power of organized labor in the country; There was a specific focus by employers on attacking the building trades within the US, given the historical strength labor had within the building crafts, of which the housing crisis provided the perfect opportunity to place blame on labor unions for high rents. Organized labor was framed as the enemy of the middle class, alongside profiteers; Pitting white collar and blue collar workers against each other.

=== 1919 ===
With tenants facing rapid rent increases. In July the City Council of Chicago passed resolutions that blamed the high rents on labor unions striking, grafting by craftsman, and lastly unscrupulous landlords. Citing the first two as the cause of the housing shortage and the primary cause.

1919 preceded the ramping up of one of the most militant, widespread and coordinated, union busting and open shop attacks by employers against labor unions, crafts & labor organizing from 1920 to 1921. A central focus of these attacks was primarily the building trades. This was because the building trades in most US cities maintained organized labor power long after workers elsewhere, such as the manufacturing industry had been defeated in their attempt to unionize. Chicago was no exception, even as late as 1929, the plurality of unionist's in Chicago were in the building trades, making up 33% of organized labor in the city.

The resolution also called for the Committee on the Judiciary to investigate the high rents and find a legal way to keep rents from being raised by more than 10%. Five days later, they concluded that they could raise the property taxes proportionally with the rent increase, which would only make landlords pay a higher percentage on the new profits. But the committee claimed nothing else could be done.

Similarly, the Chicago Real Estate Board placed the blame of high rents on the building trades.

Prior to the start of rent strikes, the Chicago Tenants Protective Association (CPTA) would be formed on August 14, 1919 This would the first step in tenant organizing by Chicagoan tenants (Note: Of 1201 Garrick Building) that would later precipitate into a much larger tenants league. The CPTA was formed in response to rapid rent increases, increasing up to 600% for some, by roughly 400 tenants.

== Strikes ==
=== 1920 ===
Tenants of the Flat Iron Building at 553 West Madison Street go on strike against a rent increase on February 12, 1920. Where the increase in rent went as high as 300% for some.

Chicago Tribune; February 12, 1920
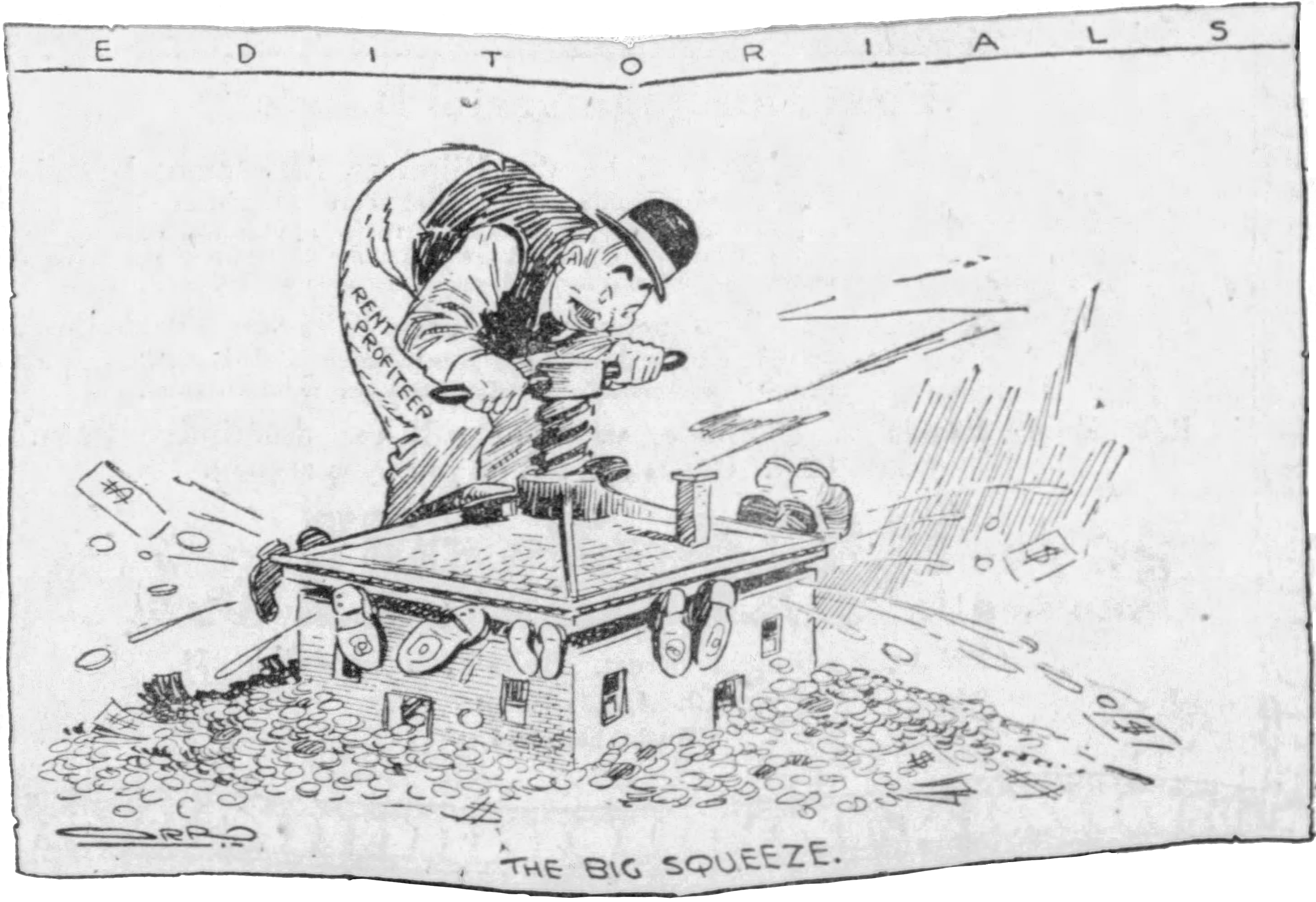

Chicago Real Estate Board promoted private arbitration with them. An allusion is made to the successful tenants strike in New York.

While some historians argue that the tenant activism of the time was middle class in nature, Maia Silber argues that middle class tenants simply represented one slice of a much broader diverse tenant coalition.

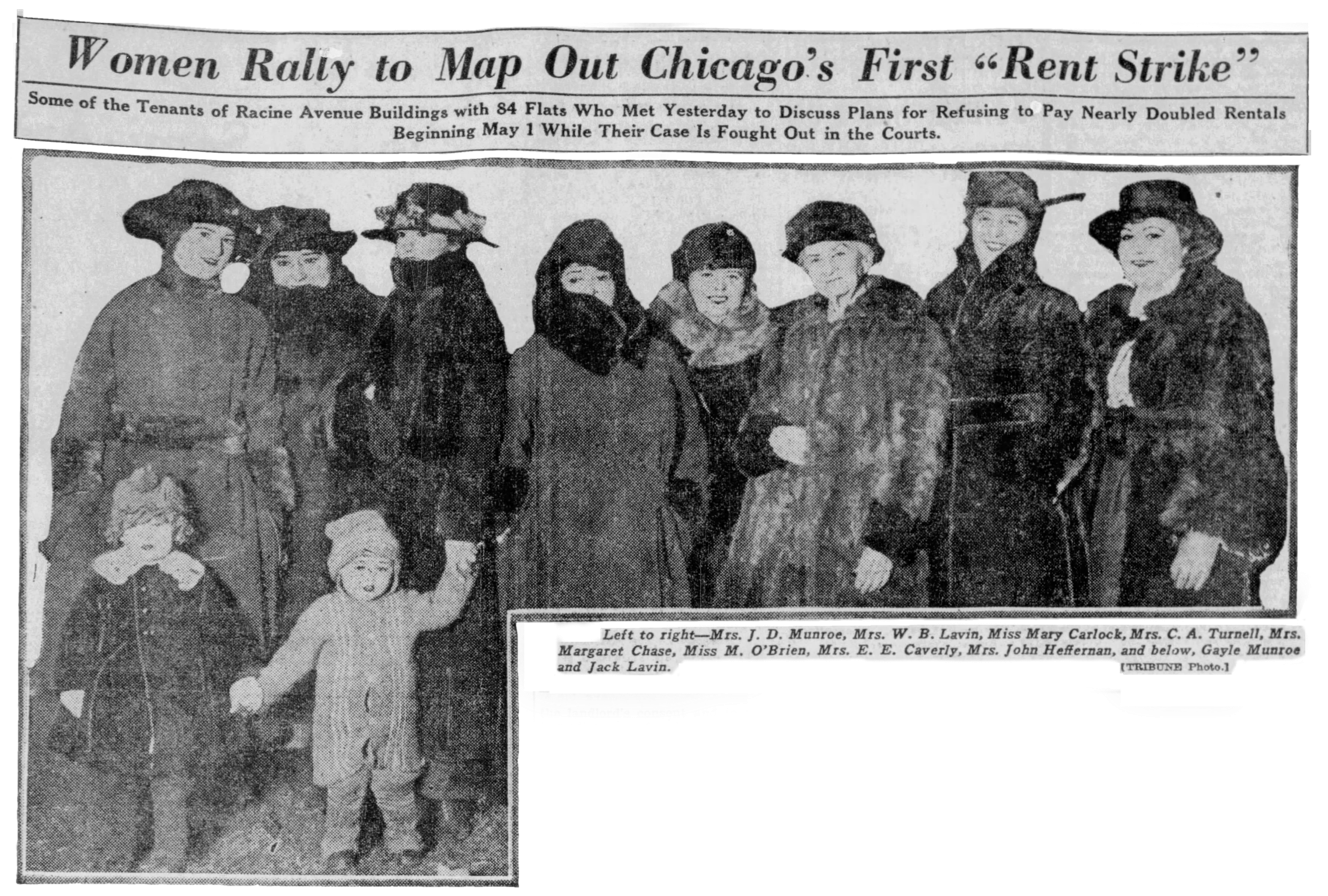
Chicago Tribune; February 29, 1920

On the night of February 27, 40 tenants at 4706–4732 North Racine Avenue apartments met, hired an attorney, former Judge Robert Turney, and decided to rent strike in response to a proposed doubling of rent. Refusing to move on May 1.

Landlords also met the same night, at a public meeting advising each other. The broad sentiment was unsympathetic towards the tenants complaints. At one point during the president of the Lake View Property Owners and Improvement Association George W. Torpe shouted "we should get as much as we can." to other landlords. While others encouraged each other to "shove it to the tenants".

The next day another meeting was held which expanded the amount of tenants planning to participate in the rent strike, to 84, of the two the Dorchester-Winchester apartment buildings on Racine Avenue. An offer was given by the tenants to not rent strike if an increase of 33.31% was accepted by the landlords. Of the situation one tenant stated:

"This is a soviet, (Note: The term is referring to soviet workers councils. A type of organizational structure, and which operated as local semi-governmental organizations. They are largely associated with the Russian revolution and later the Soviet Union.) formed to get our rent rights... We are not bolshevik, but we'll be a soviet until the landlords learn to treat us fairly. We must stick together like glue and then we will win."

— W. G. Minmeyer, tenant

During that meeting, more than 100 tenants, from Lake View to Rogers Park, unexpectedly joined the meeting calling for the organization -which was initially formed to battle the Baird & Warner real estate firm attempts to raise rent 86%–100%- be made citywide instead. Reportedly the response by Dorchester-Winchester tenants were mixed on whether to allow them into the group, with one tenant stating, "It's a wonderful idea... However, we must remember that we have to win our own little local fight first."

At this meeting the elected offices of the Racine-Avenue tenants union collected a 'war fund' of several hundreds ($100 equivalent to $1,607 in 2025) of dollars, and had their attorney Robert Turney to present a petition to the Dorchester-Winchester building agents for a fair rents. Walter J. Minnemeyer was elected as the tenant unions permanent chairmen, Miss Mary Carlock the secretary and A. E. Jessurun treasurer.

On March 4, it was reported that the tenants of the buildings planned to take the fight to the court and legislature. H. S. Standish one of the leading tenants stated that if they could mobilize 20,000 to 50,000 tenants behind them, they would be able to push for any legislation necessary.

On the afternoon of March 7, plans were made for the formation of a citywide tenant organization by the North Racine Avenue apartment tenants. Their grievances over the rent increases had also reached the city council. The tenants organization would have a group for each of their neighborhoods. There then would be a central committee composed of a president, vice president, secretary, and a representative from each of the neighborhood tenant blocks. At the meeting signs were also handed out to the tenants planning to strike to use. (Note: Pictured above in the infobox)

The first settlement for a tenant was reached in court on the afternoon March 8. The tenant agreed to pay the 2 months rent they had been holding, after the necessary repairs had been made on the house and the landlord agreeing to give her a 2-year lease.

The Rogers Park Tenant Protective Association held a meeting the night of March 8, and said that if the Racine Avenue tenants associations is unable to form a citywide tenant organization, they will. That night, C.E Dowd a veteran of World War I and tenant, spoke at the meeting where around 1,200 tenants of Roger Park attended, 1,000 of which joined the association and another 100 told to mail their applications, after they ran out of application blanks. During his speech, Dowd stated "I helped whip the greatest landlords – the former Kaiser – and I call upon you to help me whip the landlords of Chicago." Another tenant, William F. Forkhill, said to cheers, "profiteers are making anarchist of men who are honest at heart." Alderman Mulcahy, chairmen of the city council's rent committee, pledged the aid of his colleagues in the tenants movement at the meeting. It was also announced that a meeting of every neighborhood group in the city would be held in a few days, to combine into a citywide tenants association.

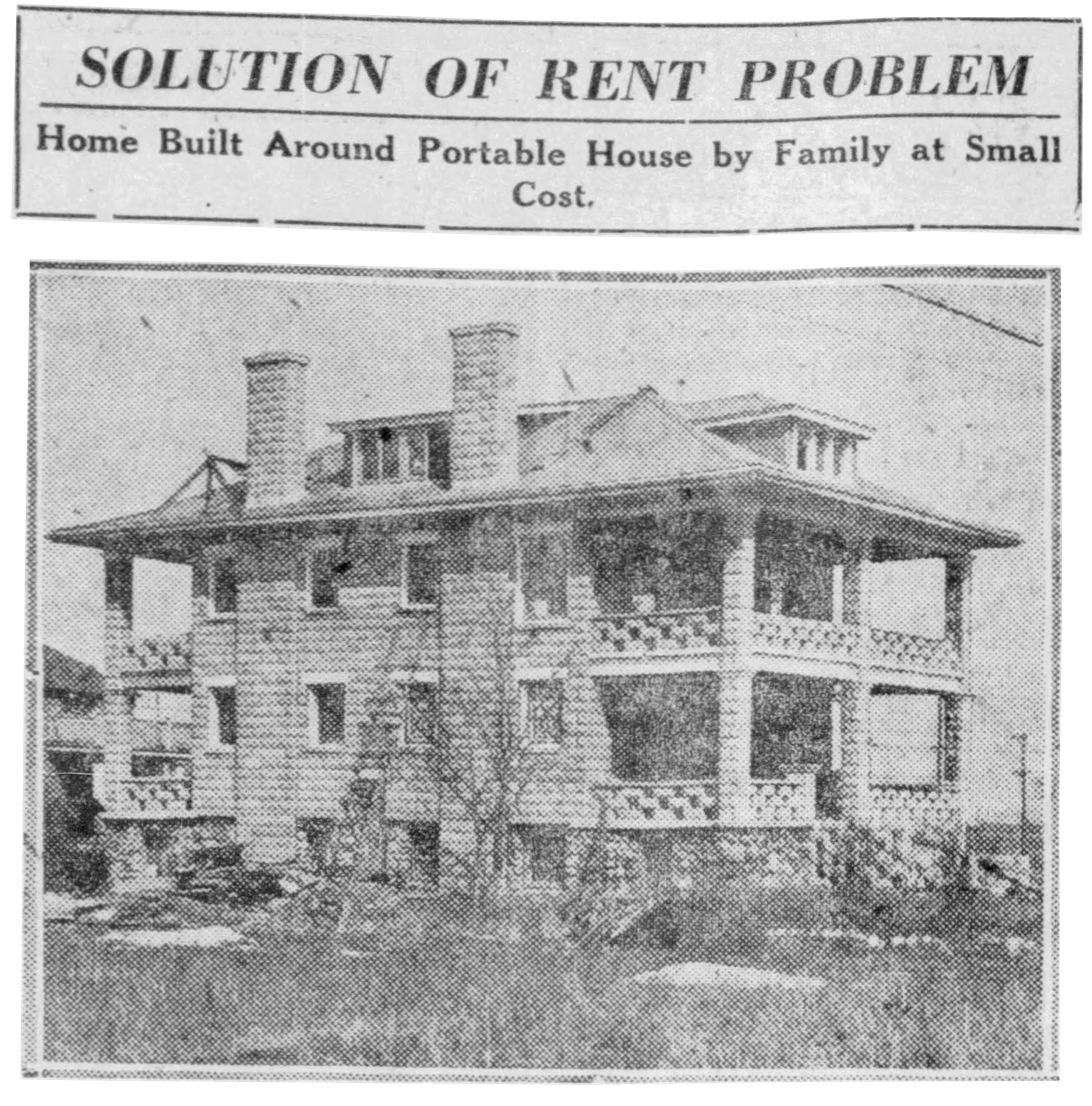
Chicago Tribune; March 23, 1920

The next week the Chicago Tenants' Protective League (CTPL) was formed. On March 18, A. E. Jessurun, Treasurer of the league addressed a pig in front of an audience of 500 white collar tenants, asking the pig for forgiveness:

"I did you an injury whenever I called a landlord a 'rent hog'... I take it all back. You certainly did nothing to deserve having your name transferred to the landlord"

— A. E. Jessurun, CTPL Treasurer

The crowd responded with a long applause, after which the pig grunted.

On March 23, a meeting was held between the Cook County real estate board committee and representatives of the tenants' associations. The estate board blamed the rising rent on building costs, and proposed building homes around a portable houses to lower costs. The Chicago Real Estate Board similarly claimed the building shortage and the trades high labor cost as at fault for the high rents, accusing labor of grafting. Later fears around a tenants blacklist by landlords were raised by the now formed CTPL.

Historian Andrew Wender Cohen, argues when discussing the rise of racketeering charges in Chicago during this period, that it was created as a rhetorical strategy by businesses in an attempt to suppress organized craftsmen.

On April 5, Milton Plotke, an owner of an option on the Dorchester-Winchester apartments agreed to arbitrate with the tenants.

==== Strike ====
On May 1, thousands of families of the Chicago Tenants Protective Association went on rent strike. H. J. Standish president of league estimated 10,000 tenants would be striking, defying Chicago's May 1 moving day.

Reportedly, many last minute agreements occurred between tenants and landlords before the strikes, with several thousand tenants moving. While others refused to vacate or being unable to find moving vans, remained in their apartments. Several days before the strike, evicting tenants had been temporarily barred by Dennis Eagan bailiff of the Municipal Courts, due to the high rent crisis. One van company was also reportedly found guilty of charging rates higher than those fixed by the city ordinances.

During that month, more than 2,000 eviction cases were filed by landlords in total.

Tenants and landlords alike were also at this time preparing for the Springfield hearing on the six-month stay of eviction law of the Kessinger Bill, as it was about to come up for a final vote by the Illinois House of Representatives. Both officials of the CPTA and CREB left the city for the capital that night. The law ended not being passed at the time.

While the Roger Park Tenants league held a meeting the night of May 4 at the Eugene Field School, two deputy bailiffs attempted to serve writs of eviction to specific striking tenants. However chairmen of the league, J.R. Patterson, in response called speakers up without using their names, in order to prevent the officers from identifying who could be served. During this meeting Patterson read out a document on "the battle of the so-called middle classes against the encroachments of the proletariat and capitalistic classes". That same day, eight tenants (Note: 1226-28-30 South Halsted street) won in court a ruling that gave them permission to remain there at the same rent rates as last year, for three more years.

According to Major H. S. Standish of the Chicago Tenants' Protective League, many couples had moved back in with one of their parents to save money.

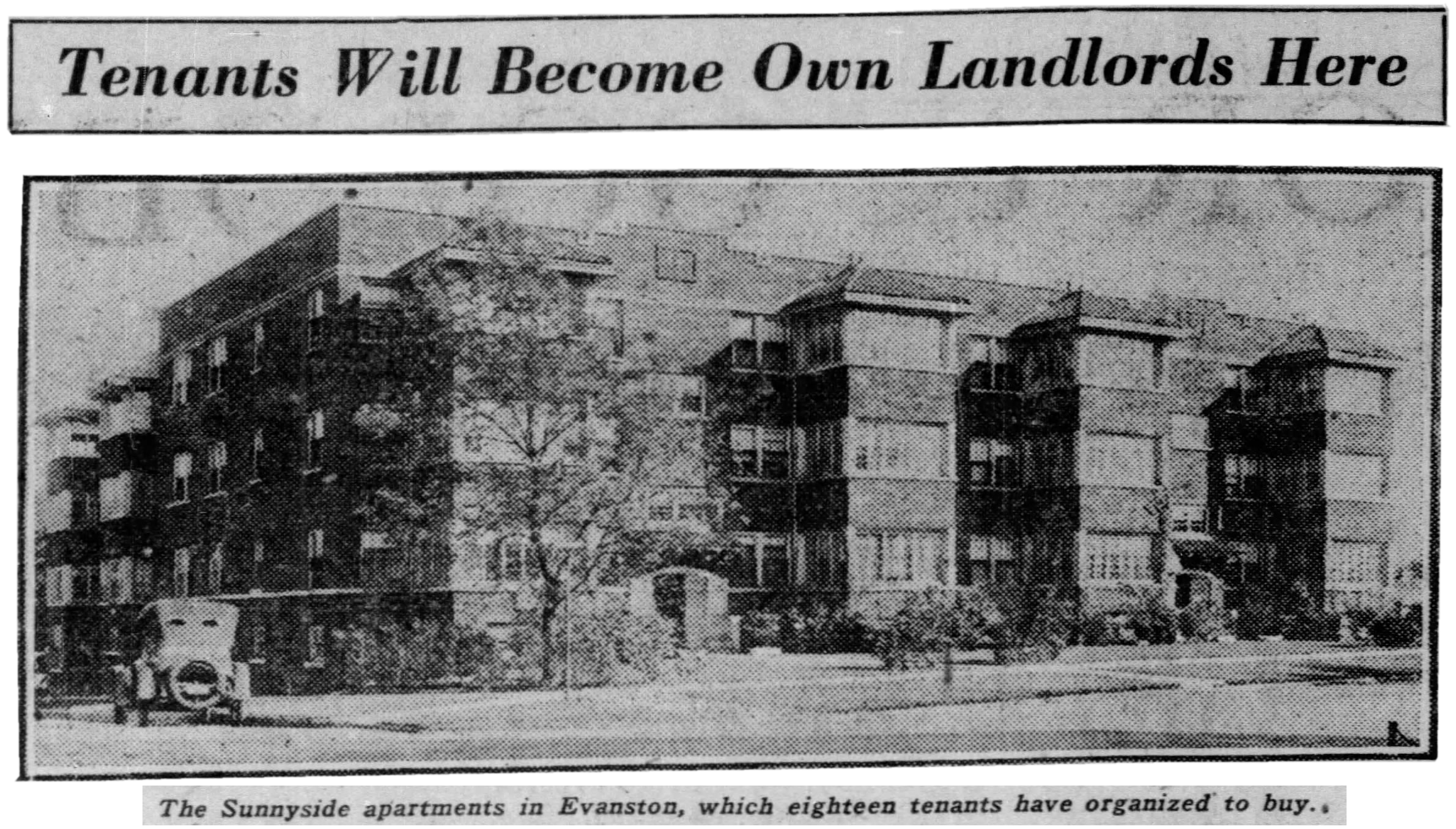
Chicago Tribune; June 20, 1920

In June, 18 families living in the Sunnyside apartments (Note: at the corner of Ridge avenue and Washington street, Evanston) formed a cooperative association to purchase the building. The building had 18 apartments each with a heated sun parlor. Each family would buy five $100 (equivalent to $1,607 in 2025) shares for each room in their apartment. This would raise $58,500 (equivalent to $940,179 in 2025) the first payment on the building alongside $75,000 mortgage from the bank. Then each family would pay $3.50/month per room (equivalent to $56 in 2025) to cover operating expenses and another monthly payment to cover the mortgage.

On the night of August 16, a mass meeting was held at Chicago's American Legion hall (Note: At North Clark street and Greenleaf avenure) to set plans for a citywide movement against rent profiteering. This would include representatives of the Roger Park Tenants Protective Association and the Wilson Avenue Tenant's association.

On August 17, a meeting was held in Springfield by Gov. Lowden of Illinois between himself and a subcommittee of the Chicago city council to discuss a proposal to call the state legislature to pass laws preventing rent profiteering. Chicago Alderman R. J. Mulcahy among several civic organizations' representative were present for this, specifically they were asking for a special session on the rent crisis.

Chicago Tenants Protective League
Organization leadership: President J. R. Patterson; (Rogers Park Association): VP Dr. H. I. Van Puyl; (Woodlawn association): Secretary A. D. Jessurun; (Wilson Avenue Association): Treasurer E. F. Hammond; (Rogers Park Association)	Planned Branches Rogers Park Wilson Avenue Lake View Woodlawn Hyde Park South Shore Garfield Park Austin

During this conference, Gov. Lowden proclaimed that the rent profiteers were beyond the scope of what existing laws could stop, and that such laws likely wouldn't be constitutional. He also stated that it was in real estate men's best interest to stamp down the profiteering. Assistant Corporation Counsel Morton S. Cressy differed with Gov. Lowden, arguing that a valid law that gave the Chicago city council authority to name a commission with powers similar to those regulating of public utilities could be passed. Arguing on the basis that Baltimore, Maryland already had such a commission.

On August 24, Morton S. Cressy explained how the CREB's new lease form wrote out tenants right to trial by jury, forfeiting it. The meeting where this was discussed was originally set to be at the Buena Memorial Presbyterian church, however one of the trustees of the church and member of real estate firm Baird & Warner gave orders to the church not to admit them forcing them to meet elsewhere. The new lease also wrote out their ability to sue for damages.

On September 3, it was announced that the United States senate would open an investigation on the housing crisis.

Then September 22, the Chicago Tenants Protective League (CPTL) officially formed, bringing together all the existing tenant associations in the city to work together on the rent crisis, with plans for further expansion into the currently unorganized districts in the city without tenant associations.

On September 28, Joseph A. Greenberg, a west side landlord announced he would be implementing a 10% reduction in rent in the two buildings he owned. He also urged other landlords to follow given the cost of living crisis.

In October, plans were announced for a campaign by the CTPL to push for anti-rent profiteering laws during the next state legislature session in January.

=== 1921 ===
==== Leadup ====
Chicago Tribune; February 18, 1921
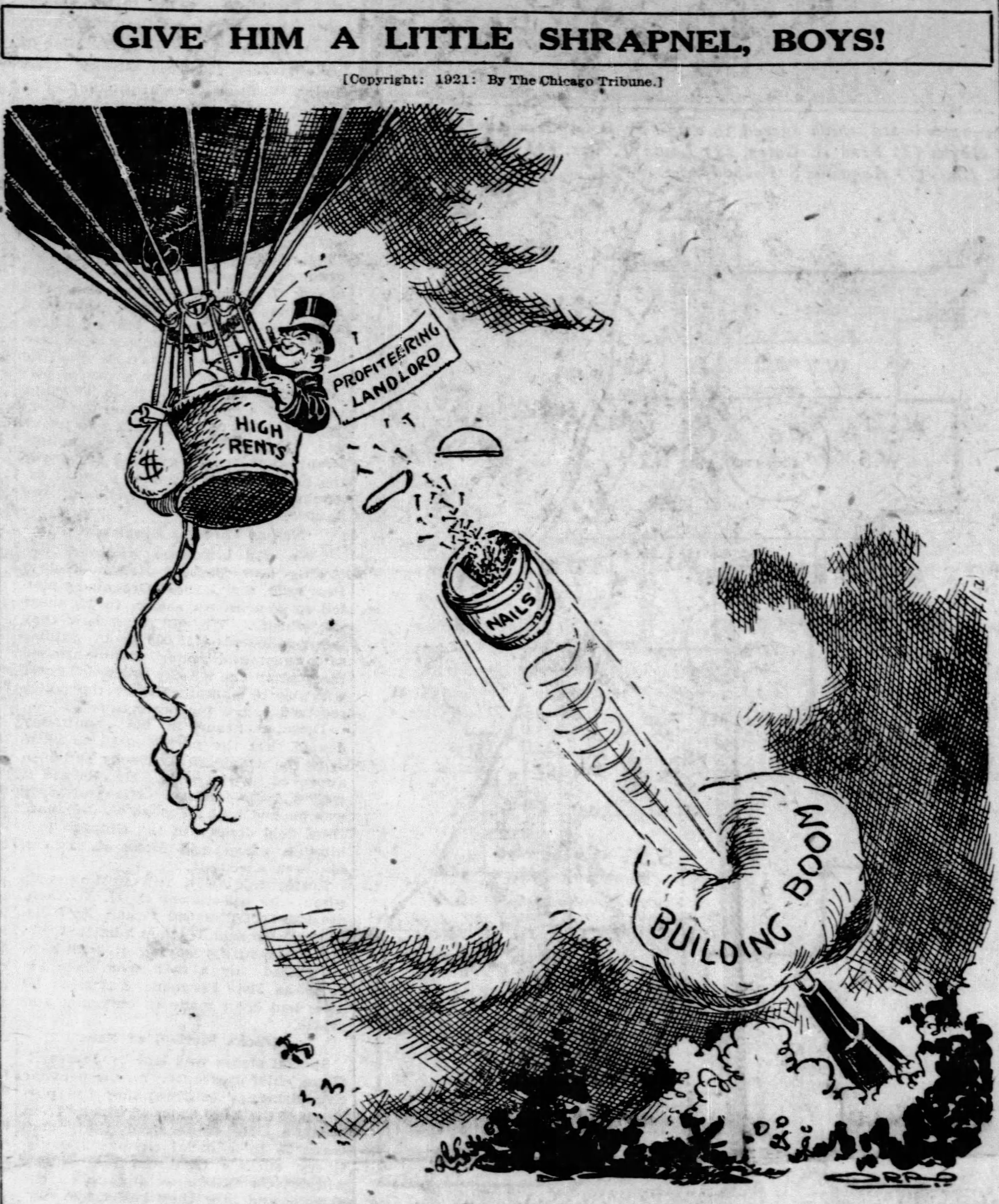

On February 15, police were guarding the eighteen apartment building (Note: At 3805 Rokeby street) after threats were made to the building. Postal cards with the following statement were reportedly mailed to half of the building occupants:

"If Germany Klotz (Note: Referring to Amelia Klotz who owned the building) raises rents, the building will be blown up."

— anonymous, mailed postcard

On February 17, the Chicago real estate board held a meeting. Where they voted to approve Brigadier General Abel Davis' plan to curb rent gouging. Abel Davis stated that if they didn't avoid more increases this year, it would guarantee that the Illinois enacted legislation that was far worse for them. He also urged them to allow fifteen days notice to tenants to renew their leases instead of 3 to 5. He also called for the board to take immediate action to simulate building construction, and to lobby for the passage of a pending bill in congress that exempted real estate mortgages from taxation.

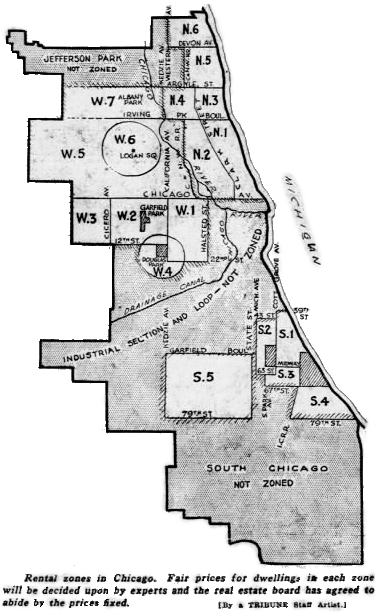
Price zones
  - Division I: Steam Heated Apartments
  (Heat supplied by landlords)
  - Class 1 – Strictly modern, built or remodeled within last ten years, with sun parlor.
  - Class 2 – Same, but with open front porch In place of sun parlor.
  - Class 3 – Same, but no sun parlor or front porch.
  - Class 4 – Buildings from ten to twenty years old, modern, with hardwood floors, electric light, and open plumbing.
  - Class 5 – Buildings over twenty years old:
  [a] Buildings with electric light, hardwood floors, and modern plumbing.
  [b] Same, but no electric light.
  [c] Soft wood floors and trim, no electric light.
  - Division II: Stove/Furnace Heated Apartments
  (Heat supplied by tenants)
  - Class 1 – Strictly modern, hardwood floors, electric light, open plumbing, heated by furnace.
  - Class 2 – Same, but heated with stoves.
  - Class 3 – All other stove and furnace heated flats
Rental districts by zone
  - North Side
  1.Lake View (Note: Chicago avenue to Irving Fark boulevard, Lake Michigan to Clark street)
  2.West Lake View (Note: Chicago avenue to Irving Park boulevard. Clark street to Chicago and Northwestern railroad)
  3.Wilson avenue (Note: Irving Park boulevard to Argyle street, Lake Michigan to Clark street)
  4.Ravenswood (Note: Clark street west to Albany Park)
  5.Edgewater (Note: Argyle street to Devon avenue, Lake Michigan to Chicago and North-western railroad)
  6. Rogers Park (Note: Devon avenue to city limits, Lake Michigan to Western avenue)
  - South Side
  1.Kenwood and Hyde Park district (Note: Thirty-ninth street to Midway. Lake Michigan to Cottage Grove avenue)
  2.Washington park (Note: Forty-third street to Sixty-third street, Cottage Grove avenue to Michigan avenue)
  3.Woodlawn (Note: Midway to Sixty-seventh street, Lake Michigan to South Park avenue)
  4.South Shore (Note: Sixty-seventh street to Seventy-ninth street. Lake Michigan to main line Illinois Central railroad)
  5.Englewood (Note: Garfield boulevard to Seventy-ninth street. State street to Kedzie avenue)
  - West Side
  1.Central west side (Note: Halsted street to California avenue)
  2.Garfield park (Note: California avenue to Cicero avenue)
  3.Austin (Note: Cicero avenue west to city limits)
  4.Douglas park (Note: territory adjacent to Douglas park)
  5.Northwest side (Note: territory in northwest part of city)
  6.Logan Square (Note: territory adjacent to Logan square)
  7.Albany Park (Note: territory lying west of Ravenswood)

As part of the plan, a tentative price fixing/price control map was established. Defined both by different geographical zoning and on the class of housing present, divided among those that were steam landlord heated apartments (Division I), and those that were stove or furnace tenant heated (Division II). These were then further divided into classes based on how modern the other amenities were. They were zoned geographically as the North, West, and South sides respectively.

The same night, Louis T. Orr the second Vice President of the Chicago Real Estate Board, advocated for the cooperation of all interests towards an extensive building program. Claiming it was the only solution to the build shortage and for landlords to combat the proposed legislation at Springfield, which was supported by tenants. The board also called for the punishing of labor, building material and building contractors, which were alleged to be in an illegal cartel to keep prices up. A large meeting by the Chicago Tenants' Protective league was also held that night. With more than a hundred turned away at the door. A. E. Jessurun, secretary of the league advising tenants' 'stand pat' and fight the landlords in the court come May 1, Chicago's set moving day for those without written leases. (Note: Similar to New York City's moving day) The league had also previously called for a legislative committee to be appointed in Springfield to investigate building conditions in Chicago.

On March 6, thousands of tenants demonstrated on the North Side, on Sheridan road, stopping traffic. The demonstration was sparked by a conflict between tenant Dr. L.C.H.E. Zeigler and landlord Dr. Joseph Watry. Joseph had raised rent from $135 to $225 a month (equivalent to $2,437 to $4,061 in 2023).

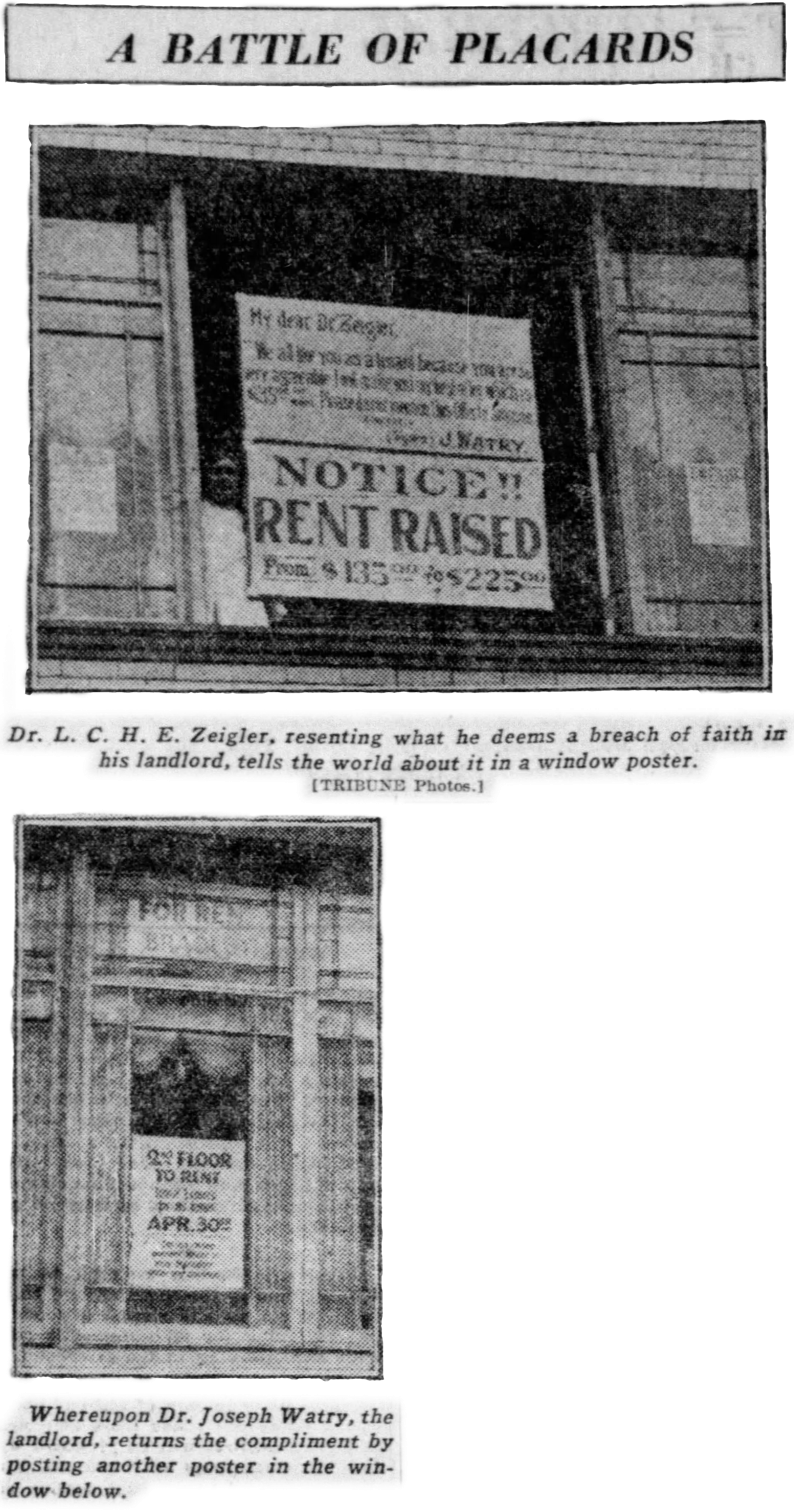
Chicago Tribune; March 7, 1921

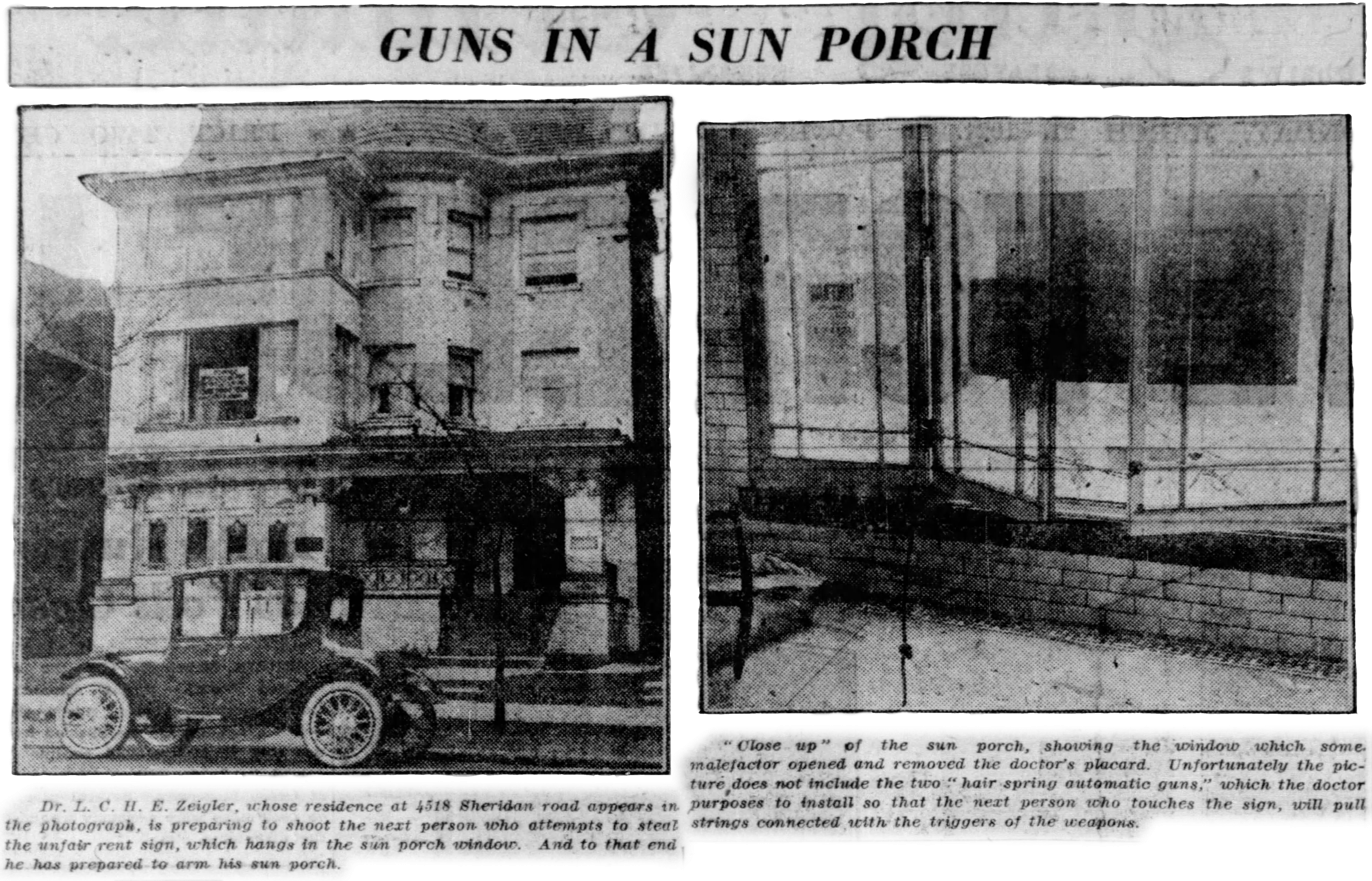
Chicago Tribune; March 21, 1921

In response Ziegler removed two windows from the front sun parlor, replacing them with a sign saying they would accept rent at $135 as their best offer and attaching the landlords notice of the rent raise. Then Dr.Watry put a sign in his window saying that Ziegler's apartment was for rent after April 30. This then lead to the demonstration as people rallied around Ziegler and stopped their cars. At one point Dr. Zeigler was cheered and induced to make a speech stating his case.

On March 20, Dr. Ziegler, who was in conflict with his landlord, had their sign stolen and added the following sign to their window in response, "Warning – This sign is hung with hairspring automatic guns suspended at each corner and can be discharged only by an attempt to steal the sign again." (Note: Shown pictured to the right) The claimed guns were yet to be installed in the window at the time. They also offered a $100 reward (equivalent to $1,805 in 2025) for an information leading to the conviction of the person(s) who stole the sign.

On March 7, the Chicago Federation of Labor passed a resolution condemning profiteering landlords and also directed their legislative committee to write a bill for presentation at Springfield with cooperation with the tenants' league if possible. That day several additional apartments were also organized by the Chicago Tenants' Protective League. There was also an announcement of the final plans for the March 16 junket at Springfield when the Kessinger (Note: Named after its sponsor Harold Kessinger) Enabling Act for City Rent Commissions would come up to a hearing.

The Kissinger rental bill were a set of a few different proposed bills surrounding landlord-tenant law in Illinois, in an attempt to address the crisis. The two main provisions were:

1. Tenant right to trial by jury, even if waived in the lease.
2. Giving municipal court judges the ability to grant tenants a stay up to six months before executing a forcible detainer. During which tenants would still be responsible for rent, charged at the same rate as one month before the leases expiration.

The second provision would in effect allow tenants to delay an increase in rent for up to six months, providing temporary relief.

In the interest of the passage of these bills, the CPTL organized for another mass rent strike come May 1, 1921. Initially legislators promised to vote on the bill before then hoping to avoid the strike. The right to a jury trial was passed and signed by Governor Len Small before May 1. However the second measure would later be delayed (Note: Enough of the legislature failed to show up for a planned vote on April 27, causing the delay.) till after May 1.

On March 21, each interested group were preparing for the upcoming legislative session on the Kessinger bill the next day. One of the 12 member CPTL rent committee that planned to attend the session, was the Evanston News-Index which opposed their high commercial rents. Further organizing of tenants by the CTPL in South Evanston with at least 500 members expected to join over the next few weeks.

The city government also prepared for impending rent strike. Stationing extra police outside apartment buildings, and municipal court judges holding an emergency meeting to plan for handling the high number of eviction orders expected after the start of the strike.

An additional issue for tenants was landlords failing to comfortably heat tenant apartments or not repairing broken heating.

==== Passing of Kessinger Laws and crackdown on building labor trades ====
By March 24, the department of internal revenue had begun making a list of apartment buildings with 'rent war signs' to locate landlords who failed to list rent increases in their income tax schedules. After which several landlords voluntarily appeared for this claiming it was a simple mistake.

On March 23, the Dailey Joint Committee was established by the state legislature to investigate the building conditions in Chicago. With one aspect investigating whether any "'unreasonable' rules of unions which load unproductive labor upon the building [cost]." existed.

The Kessinger bill(s) had several different laws that had yet to be passed yet:

- To enable cities to establish rent commissions, to fix just and reasonable rents.
- To give tenants a 60-day grace period to stay on the property after receiving a notice to vacate.
- To allow judges to grant a six months stay of execution in eviction cases, applying to cities and villages but exempting farm land.
- To remove the 'double penalty' for a tenant who holds over, staying past their lease date. A double penalty, is rent charged at twice the usual rate, for time over the lease expiration.

The last two were expected to pass, while the first was predicted to die in the house by the Chicago Tribune.

The Kessinger rent commission law passed the senate on March 23. The real estate board said they believed it would be killed in the house, blaming the Building Trades Council of Chicago, claiming their influence would be the cause of its failure to pass. E. A. Potter, one of the leaders of the Building Trades Council of Chicago, refuted this claim. Stating, "The rank and file of the building trade are also renters and are as much in need of this legislation as any of the white collared workers."

On March 30, two of the Kessinger laws were passed. One gave tenants uncontested legal right to stay on the property up to 60 days from receiving a notice to vacate. The second gave tenants right to a jury trial, when their right to continue living in an apartment was at stake.

Chicago Tribune; April 2, 1921
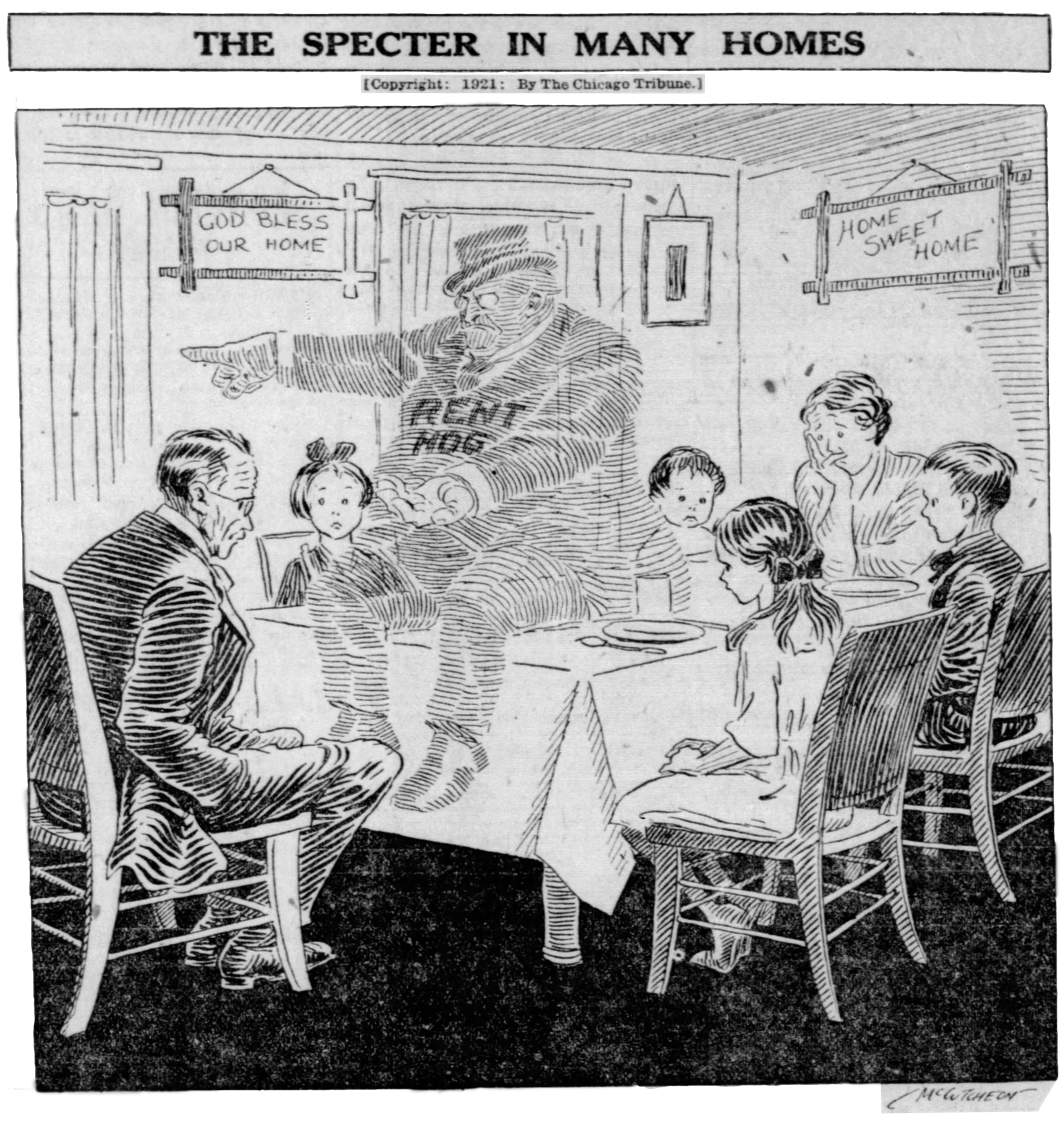

On April 1, the Chicago Building Trades Council unanimously agreed to put up the Contractors' businesses association request to make a 25% reduction in wages up to a vote by their membership. Putting up this proposal to a vote had been rejected twice before by the building trades council.

On April 2, it was reported that Chicago tenants planning to move on the May 1 moving day were having trouble finding moving vans companies who were still available. One core issue was the un-sureness on whether residencies a tenant planned to move into would still be occupied by a striking tenant. Leaving the moving company unsure where to store the furniture.

On April 8, a majority of the Chicago Building Trades Councils' unions, voted against accepting the 25% wage cut.

==== Strike ====
On May 1, the rent strike began. With tenants of the Chicago Tenants Protective league given last minute instructions by their generals to resist all efforts by landlords to evict them illegally and report any attempts to their local headquarters. The next morning thousands of eviction filings were made by landlords. Tenants stated they would demand jury trials for every case.

The rent strike by tenants operated in the form of paying the previous rent amount agreed too before the raise, sent through registered delivery mail or in the presence of witnesses. All cases had the payment rejected by landlords.

The first settlements happened among tenants and landlords on the first day of the strike on East 67th Place. The landlord, instead of increasing rent of $50/month apartments to $70/month and $55/month apartments to $75/month; They agreed to instead raise them to $60/month and $65/month respectively.

It was also reported that many landlords were waiting for the outcome of the six month Kessinger stay law on May 3, before deciding how to respond. Likely making compromises with tenants if it passes.

Chicago Tribune; May 7, 1921
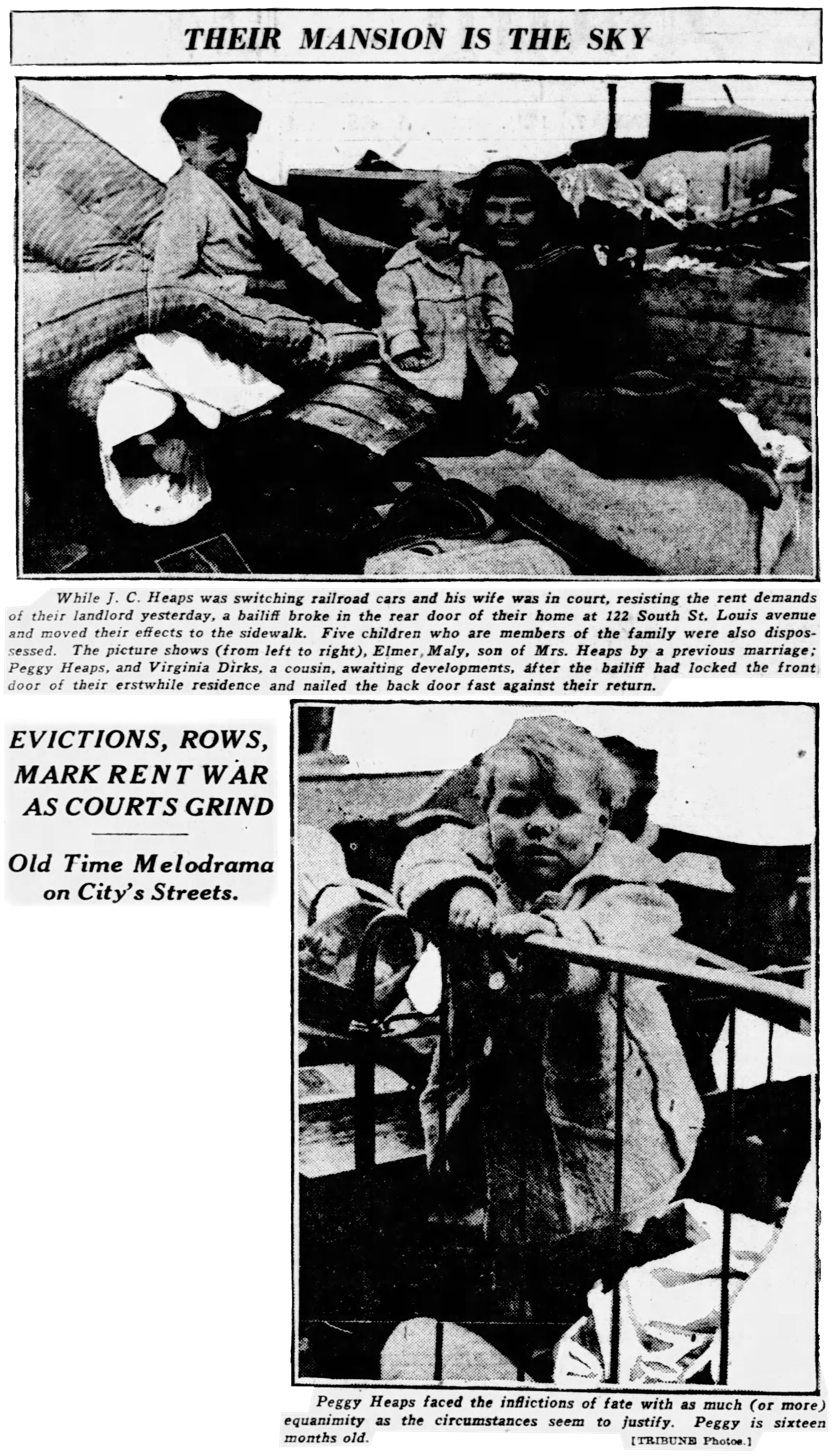

44 additional tenants from West Madison street also joined the rent strike last minute on May 2 after being faced with a 40% rent increase.

During the CPTL's time in Springfield to lobby for the passage of the six-month stay law, they were met with parade upon arrival by the local "Anti-Gougers" league and a band. Indicative of the racism present at the time, and the CPTL's largely white middle class nature:

"Bringing up the rear [of the parade] on the way to the state house was a colored man with a canvas smock inscribed 'Rent Hog.' He was cuffed and dragged—mock stuff—all the way up to the steps and earned his $10 all right."

— Chicago Tribune

On May 3, the six month Kessinger stay law passed the house by a close vote, 104 to 29, which was only two votes above the 102 vote minimum to pass due to the emergency clauses that existed in the legislation. The CPTL presented Governor Small with a gold pen the group had purchased, which Small accepted signing the bill in front of cameras.

On May 3, it was reported that striking tenants on the whole were largely winning concessions from landlords following the start of the May 1 rent strikes. In several cases landlords agreed to cut their increases by half or sometimes, by two thirds. In Edgewater alone around 400 to 500 tenants were on strike. In the case of the Edgewater tenants, for those still faced with eviction cases where the landlord didn't initially relent; 56 of the 150 had already been settled out of court, where landlords offered to compromise.

Moving van men of the city also reported difficulties, as often they would show up to an apartment to help a new tenant move in, only to find the apartment still occupied by a striking tenant. In total, as of May 3, more than 600 eviction cases had been filed in the Municipal court. The clerk of court, James A. Kearns reported that they expected to receive more than 4,000 eviction cases during the month.

The tenants of the CPTL heavily celebrated the winning of the six-month stay law, with a festival planned for May 12 announced. President of the league Patterson stated, "We intend to make the carnival the biggest event ever known in the history of Chicago tenants... "[the] new laws will protect us from profiteers."

===== Racism and Segregation =====
On May 4, 1921 the Chicago Real Estate Board voted unanimously to enforce racial covenants, to make it so the punishment for selling a property to a black family in white neighborhoods would be immediate expulsion from the board. This existed within the context of a supreme court ruling a few years earlier that made it illegal to use police power to segregate, so in response real estate associations increasingly adopted contracts to enforce and further implement segregation.

Racial segregation served as a financial tool under racial capitalism as a means to extract further profit through economic exploitation, argues academics Amber R. Crowell and Michael Thomas Kelly.

This time period was marked by an increasing consolidation, corporatization, professionalization, and coordination of Real estate interests. President of the Real Estate Association of NY would speak in 1907, claiming one reason for coordination among real estate interest was for the guarding against “enormous foreign immigration and the low order of intelligence among the vast number of our newly made citizens".

These actions also existed in the context of the rent strikes. A connection between racialized groups - Eastern European immigrants during the late 1800s and early 1900s, Chinese and Japanese immigrants, and Black Americans- as instigators of class conflict were often espoused by leaders within Real Estate; In Buffalo, NY on 1917 the National Real Estate Association VP expressed such sentiments, warning against “the collectivism being preached by socialists and foreign influences in limiting if not absolutely destroying private property”.

Similarly, within the context of the 1918-20 New York City Rent strikes, The National Real Estate Journal quotes a NYC municipal judge in its 1920 publication, where the judge calls on the need to control tenant organizing:

"As I go through the East Side, I hear Bolshevism preached on the street corners and from the tails of trucks… I know that if this poisonous virus is not removed these people will be able to lead this great mob… into anarchy, riot and revolt. If they succeed in their plans to organize 250,000 families in this city into leagues impregnated with the poison of Bolshevism, there is no instrumentality of government that can cope with the situation"

The greater coordination that occurred between real estate interests and landlords across the US occurred was in part a response to the development of rent strikes in NYC, and later Chicago. Racial segregation served the interests of both. By constructing highly segregated communities, black residents who on average were poorer could be exploited for greater profits based on their economic vulnerability; And by closing off the option of home ownership to Black tenants, higher rents could be charged. In addition the segregation by race impeded the ability for broad base working class solidarity and organizing, coordinating off those considered a potential organizing threat from resources.

As Running with the Land states, "For city, state, and national real estate associations, 'cooperation' meant cooperating in a shared class interest, against communism, taxation on real estate transactions, and tenants or workers who posed economic threats."

==== Dailey Commission ====
The Dailey Commission which was established on March 23 to investigate the cause of the building shortage and high rents; Became a major part of the public discourse around the housing crisis in Chicago.

The committee held meetings until its conclusion in June 1921, during its operation it mainly focused on testimony from those in the building industry who claimed graft and corruption within labor unions and contractors. From which it concluded that it played the biggest role in the housing crisis. The extent of union corruption was likely exaggerated by committee, however documented evidence did show that a number of Chicago unions had worked with contractors to use only local unionized labor.

The commission did call on landlords of the Chicago Real Estate Board during its operation to answer rumors they had conspired against new building operations to maintain high rents, however the focus of the commission remain squarely on view labor as the main source of the crisis.

The practices of labor unions within the craft & trades industries was reflective of broader struggle between their traditional protective actions and nationwide companies pursuit of profit & streamlining through the division of labor. The origin of the word rackteering was reflective of this, it was coined in 1927 by a professional strikebreaker in 1927 to condemn leaders of craft organizations in Chicago.

The practices of the trades ensured job stability, & relative independence was prioritized over pure efficiency or profit within local businesses, while the consolidating and monopolizing corporate sector was in direct opposition with this economic order.

Nationwide corporations remained at the forefront of this fight, the streamlining of labor threatened to break up the bargaining power of those in the traditionally skilled craft sectors. The crafts typically took years for a single person to learn every aspect, which corporations intended to divide into a set of divided simple tasks, where no one worker knew how to do the entire process. This reduced the bargaining power of workers in two ways: by making them more easily replaceable, and preventing workers from being independent or self employed by virtue of not knowing how to do the whole process.

Tenant organizations such as the CPTL for their part, praised U.S. District Attorney Charles F. Clyne for indicting union officials and contractors for graft.

The sensationalism of the labor practices within the building trades by the committee provided ammunition to organizations like the Building Construction Employeers Association (BCEA) and the Associated Builders, Chicago's most powerful contractors organizations, to attack the labor trades and claim them as an enemy to middle class tenants and "the public". Which it would use to defend its attempt to reduce the ways of workers in May, 1921, leading to a lockout of workers and court proceedings.

==== The Landis Award ====
===== Building trades lockout =====
Chicago general building trades lockout
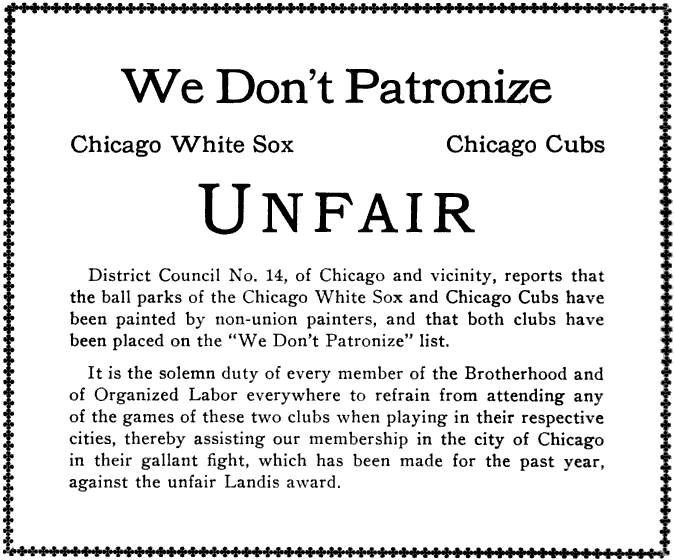
- Public notice published in April 1923 urging a labor boycott of the Chicago White Sox and Chicago Cubs, and opposing the Landis building trades award
- Date: May 1, 1921 - June 14, 1921
- Location: Chicago, Illinois
- Caused by: Attempt by employers to reduce minimum wage rates: $1.25 to $1.00 an hour for skilled trades $1.00 to 70¢ an hour for unskilled trades
- Result: Landis Award decision

Parties
Chicago Building Trades Council	Direct: Building Construction Employers' Association of Chicago; Associated Builders; Support: 'Citizens Committee to Enforce the Landis Award'; Chicago Association of Commerce Illinois Manufacturers Association National Manufacturers Association Associated General Contractors of America

Units involved
10,000 union workers	

Following several months of failed negotiations between the Building Construction Employers Association (BCEA), the Associated Builders and the workers' Building Trade Council (BTC) in early 1921. The BCEA & Associated Builders started a contractor lockout against the workers.

The contractors had been demanding a reduction in wages for both the skilled and unskilled trades, a 25¢/hour (equivalent to $5 in 2025) reduction for the skilled trades and a 30¢/hour (equivalent to $5 in 2025) reduction for the unskilled trades.

The contractors publicly blamed labor unions and the current wage rates for the housing shortage, with the claim a reduction in wages would spur new housing construction across the city. However this was also part of a far broader open shop drive throughout the entire country across every industry, to remove wage minimums and destroy union membership broadly.

On January 21, 1921, the Building Trades Council had voted to opposed the reductions by the contractors. With this the Employers started their lockout of 10,000 building trade workers on May 1 putting them out of work, a month before the unions contract was set to expire.

This lockout lasted for six weeks, until June 11 when the joint arbitration boards of the BCEA and BTC agreed to Judge Kenesaw Mountain Landis as the arbitrator to settle it. The workers returned to work three days after Landis was agreed upon as the arbitrator, at the previously agreed upon rates until Landis' decision on wages.

===== Court decision =====
Landis had a complicated relationship to both unions and employers. Landis was both a federal judge and a fresh commissioner of Major League Baseball. He had both famously fined Standard Oil $29,240,000, the maximum penalty he could impose & the largest fine a corporation had received to date, and at the same time had heavily prosecuted socialists and labor leaders during his time on the bench.

Originally the agreement for arbitration was on the basis of only settling the wage dispute. However Judge Landis, after starting arbitration refused to set wages until he was permitted to go into each unions working rules. Demanding copies for all agreements and working rules from the Building Trades Council. Which President Kearney of the council acquiesced to, despite the majority opposition by the union leaders in the council. On July 20, 1921, Judge Landis announced that he would require that all working rules and labor contracts had to upended and take a "new uniform form" approved by him. Several unions dropped out of arbitration during this process.

Among the announcement in July were several of the proposed guidelines, which among other aspects fined a union (minimum fine of $25, equivalent to $451 in 2025) for striking in response to a nonunion worker present on the job.

On September 7, 1921, the arbitration award was formally announced. The events following the Landis Award abruptly shattered the balance of power that had existed between organized contractors & organized workers from 1911 to 1921. The award was a byproduct of a broader movement by corporations to destroy unions, known as the open shop American plan, and Landis' decision was likely influenced by the findings of the Dailey commission and was mentioned in the decision. The heart of the open shop movement started in Chicago. The American Employers' Open Shop Association, which coordinated the broader movements by corporations against unions in the US, had its headquarters established in Chicago.

The award significantly altered work rules, to an effectively open shop principle, hostile to union organizing. It gave contractors the ability to hire non-union workers, if union workers were not found within four days and prohibited workers from striking in response to non-union workers on a job-site. It also set what a union could negotiate for, preventing a union from negotiating a max hour limit for workers.

It also massively reduced wage scales. Reducing skilled trade wages between 10 and 42% and reducing each one of the unskilled trades between 13 and 52.5%. The wages also were not a minimum wage, as previously established by labor unions, but instead a maximum wage, where corporations would be fined by the city if they exceeded the wage rate, this dramatically decreased union workers income. Landis had cut wages to less than employers had offered to pay workers.

One additionally controversial aspect of Landis' Award is that he gave 'would be reductions' for unions in the city not subject to the arbitration, overstepping his legal authority.

===== Response =====
Chicago labor unions were outraged by the Landis decision, refusing to abide by the award. Many of the unions also immediately appealed for a rehearing. In response, Judge Lands promised if by December 8, 1921, unions had removed certain provisions in their contracts that he still objected to he would rehear their cases. Ten unions agreed to this, of which only two were granted wage increases compared to the previous Landis award. This second decision was on January 31, 1922.

"Judge Landis, with no building trade experience, after considering the situation for the short period of three months during which time he was occupied on the bench, giving some attention to his job as chief baseball umpire, some at playing golf... [mandated] impractical and unjust working rules."

— Chicago Federation of Labor,

===== Citizens Committee =====
Judge Landis found himself completely unable to actually enforce the arbitration decision, and unions openly refused to agree to such demands. In response to this on November 15, 1921, the Citizens Committee To Enforce The Landis Award (CCELA) was formed by Chicago businessmen associated with the Chicago Association of Commerce. The organization claimed to represent Chicago citizens; But was actually composed of 176 wealthy bankers, manufacturers, merchants, and others of the business owner class.

Chicago Tribune; May 11, 1922
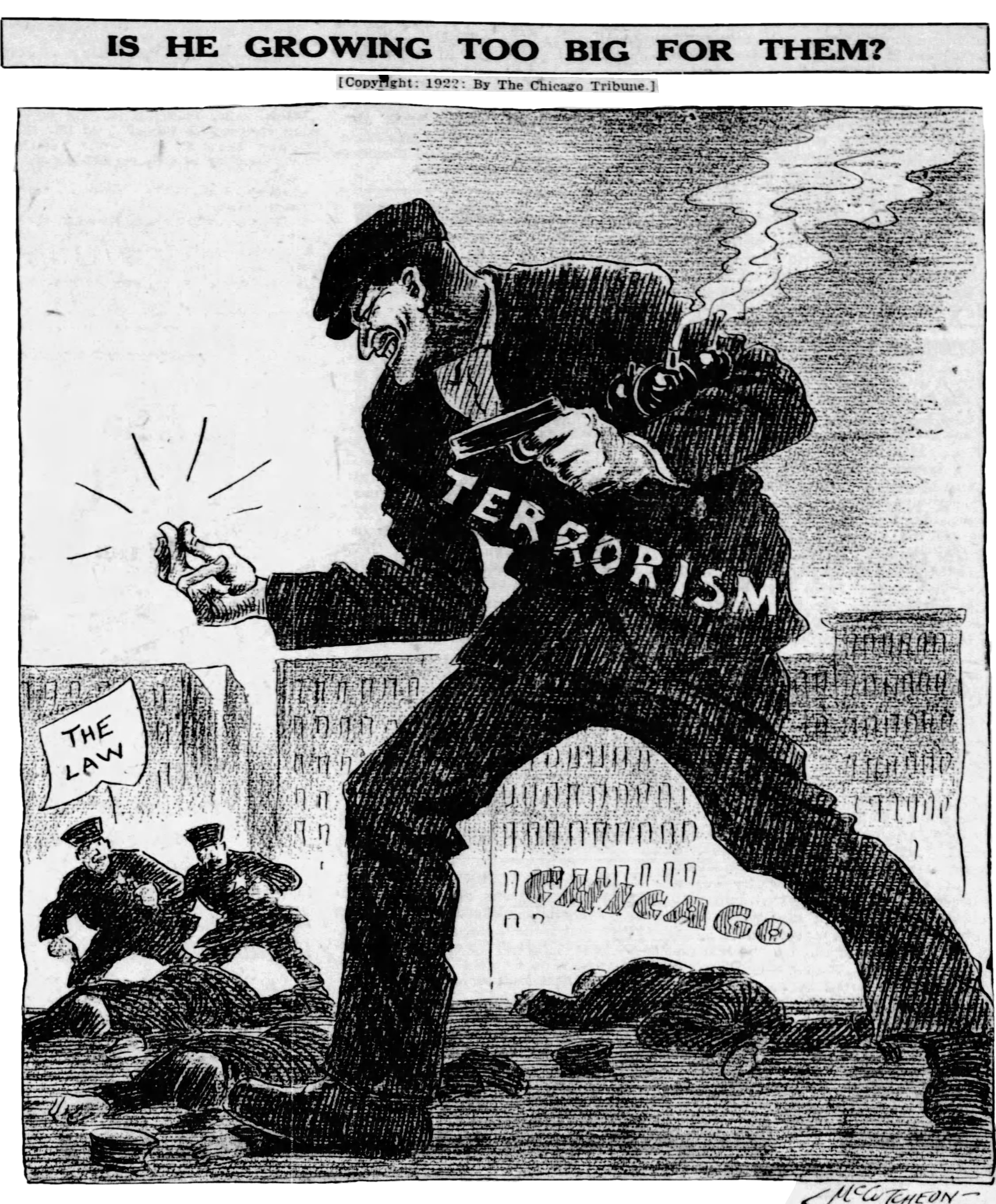

The CCELA used language to appeal to middle class residents, in attempt to turn them against organized labor. In one such pamphlet released by the organization, organized labor was compared to the snake in the Garden of Eden, and accused it of betraying 'the public'. The organization claimed its purpose was to "protect against strikes, graft, sabotage and boycotting of materials" following the findings of the Dailey commission.

The CCELA also used more than press releases to serve building companies interests under the logic of enforcing the Landis Award; The organization arranged building contractors to make job bids when competition seemed insufficient, spied and exposed people and groups who did not follow the award, encouraged companies to only work with firms under the Landis Award terms, brought in building strikebreakers from outside Chicago to replace strikers, and hired around 700 private militia guards to 'protect' work sites.

The use of a 'Citizens Committee' as a method of enforcing open shop decisions, and assisting corporations in subverting labor union demands, was not unique to Chicago. Such committees formed all over the country from Chicago to Cleveland, San Francisco, Detroit and Passaic. Most commonly they developed out antilabor drives by individual employers associations, in an attempt to draw the rest of the business owner class into a war on trade unions.

In addition to Citizens Committee's a more subtle and permanent form of organizations were the Citizens Alliances, which were open shop associations established to maintain non-union shops in certain industries, rather than openly fight against currently union dominated industries.

Based on a study of building insurance records, its indicated that in the time period potentially more than 85% of building in Cook County occurred under Landis Award guidelines.

The Landis Award eventually expired in 1926, with new agreements signed between the BTC and the Employers, with practically all features objectionable to labor of the Landis Decision removed. By the end of the 1920s the Chicago building trades union membership still remained strong, but operated in an increasingly hostile environment due to the anti union drives by employers.

===== Labor bombings =====
Chicago Tribune; May 10, 1922
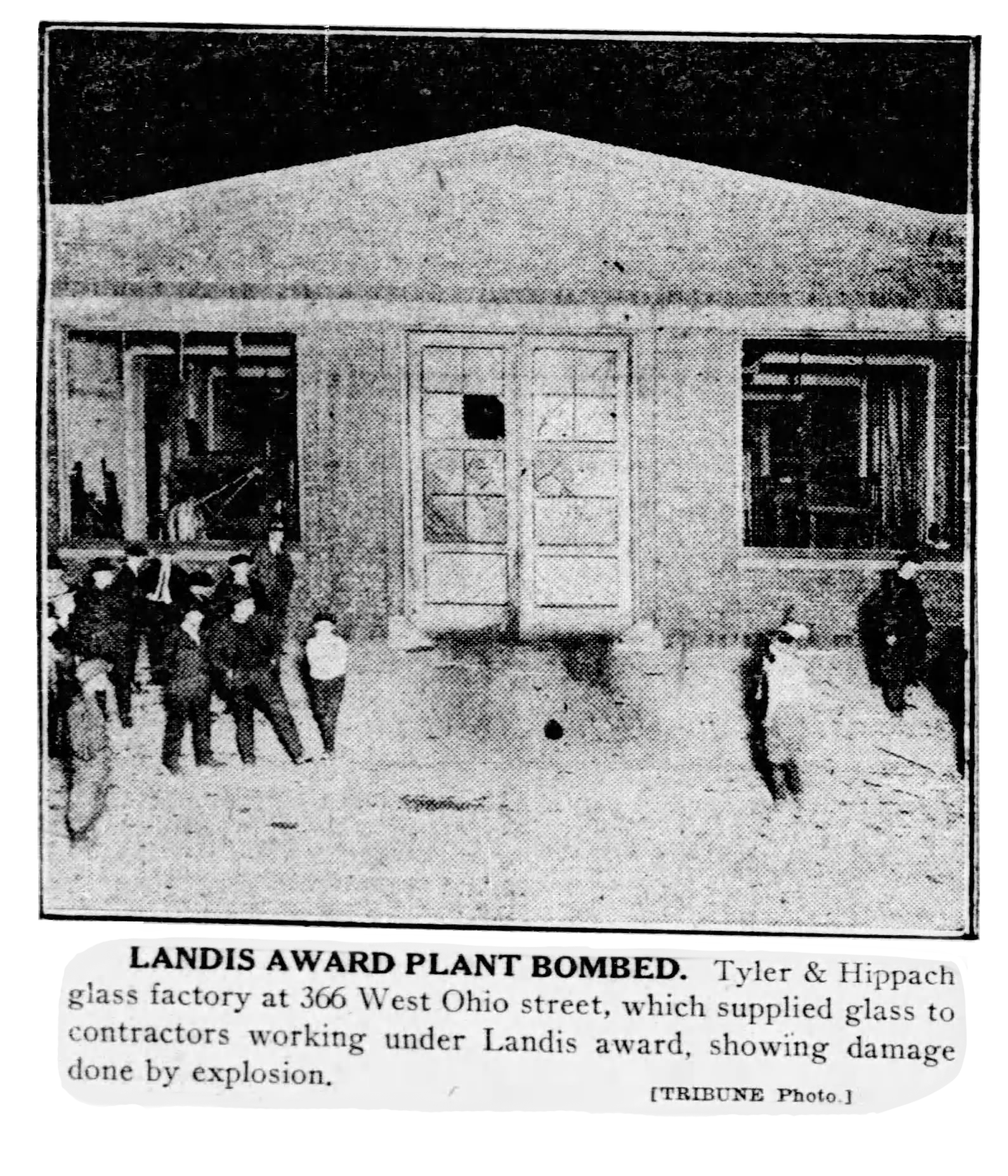

In response to the Landis award, some craft labor unions responded with targeted bombings of Landis award worksites. One of the most well known Chicago labor leader indicative of this was "Big Tim" D. Murphy, in 1922 he stood trial for allegedly killing policeman Thomas Clark during a bombing of a worksite. However, this indictment was eventually dropped by the state.

Murphy was a popular union official, and in 1920 explained his view on the labor movement as follows: "A man that can't fight don't amount to much [because] they don't use boxing gloves in the labor movement, they use Smith and Wessons."

The Labor Age a progressive pro-union magazine from the time had the following opinion on the situation; That such bombings were only indicative of a small portion of workers, who were antithetical to the radical or progressive rank & file unionists that made up the unions. It also called out the hypocrisy of such calls, mentioning the West Virginia coal wars where miners were on trial for treason, after company mercenaries and the US Government had dropped bombs on the strikers, but themselves were not on trial despite their violence against workers.

Chicago Tribune; June 9, 1922
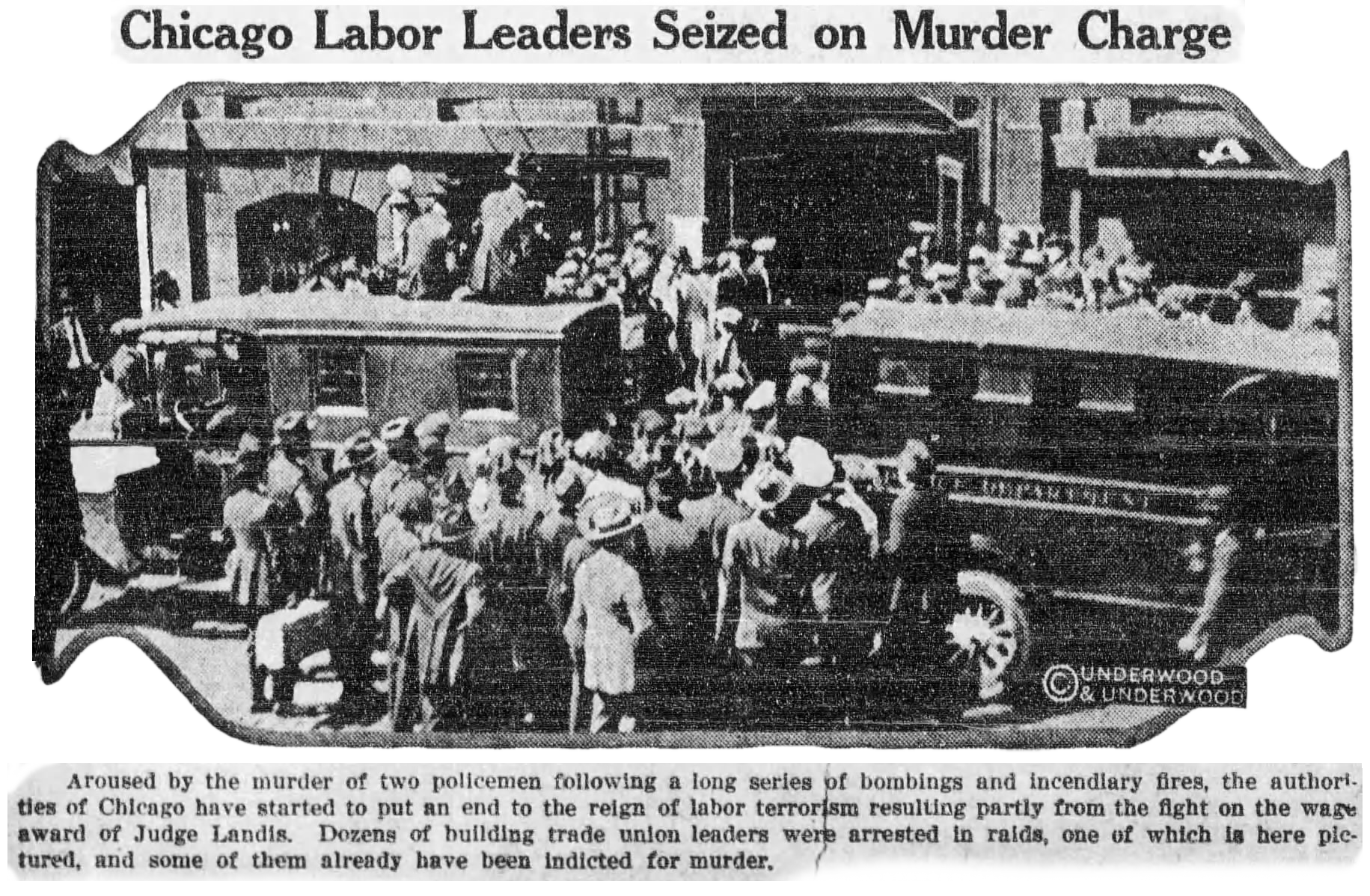

The magazine goes on to quote an opinion by The Rank and File, a Pacific Coast labor publication:

"Big Tim Murphy, Fred Mader and Con Shea are in jail, charged with murder. Any worker who knows the role of grafting and corruption that they have played these many years has no love for [them]...

The charge of murder rests upon the flimsy evidence that 'somebody'. killed a cop and that 'somebody' planted a bomb. Big Tim is held responsible because he said: 'If the Citizens' Committee continues its attack upon organized labor much longer, I will not be able to restrain the men from violence.' That is his crime...

Their eagerness to rush a trial suggests frame-up. In every frame-up delay is fatal. 'Make them swing for it first, and find out who did it afterwards,' is the attitude of Big Business in Chicago. And in the meantime use the harlot press to create an atmosphere which will make it easy for us to destroy the entire Chicago labor movement."

Chicago Tribune; Oct. 15, 1923
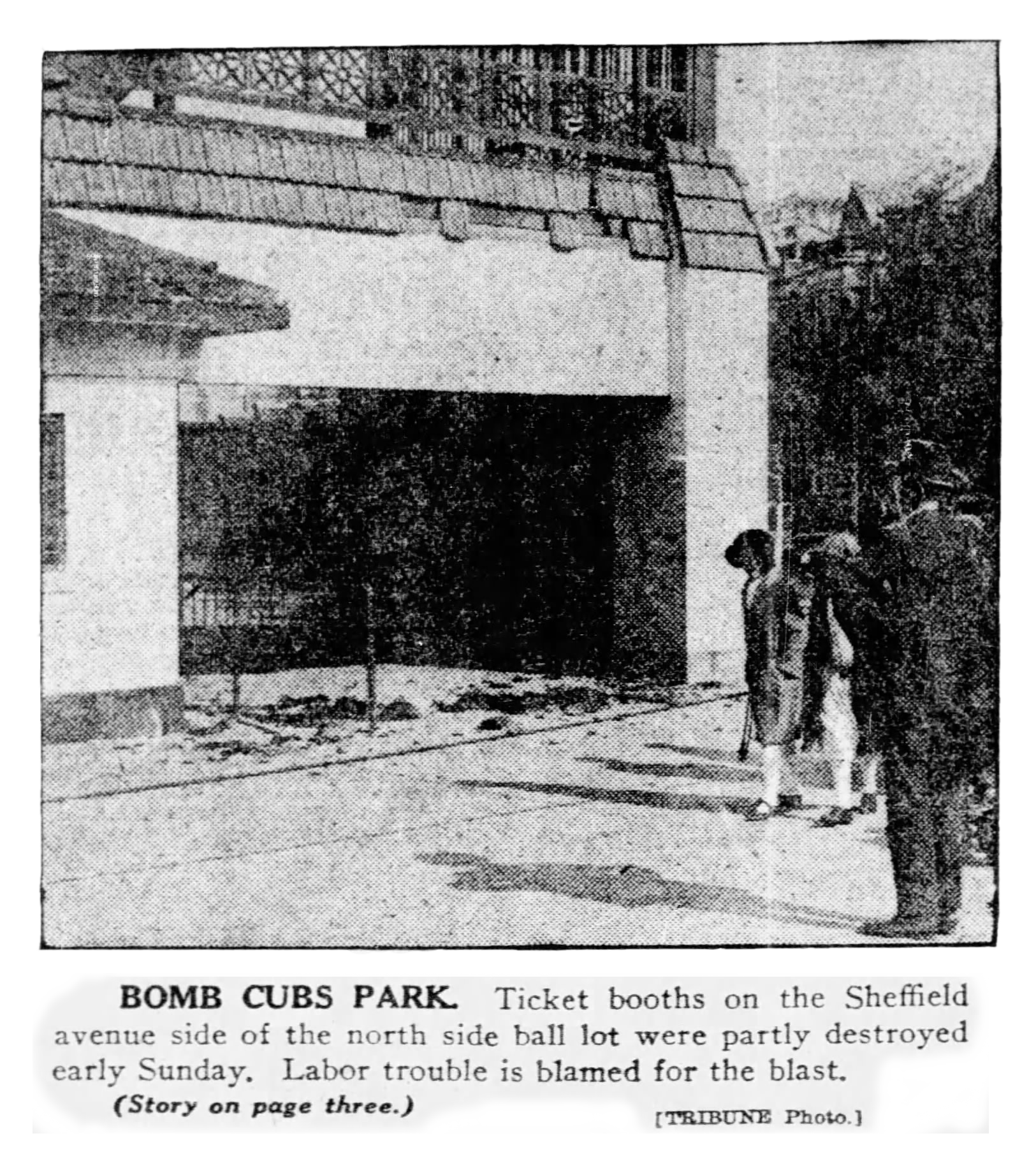

The bombing Murphy was on trial for occurred on the morning of May 10, 1922 when the Tyler & Hippach garage and the Henneberry Printing Plant were bombed in Chicago, during which two police officers were killed in shootings and one injured. After these bombing "Big Tim" Murphy was arrested, on suspicion of being involved. Twenty-three union members were arrested by the police following the bombing, as police suspect the motivation for the bombing was to fight the Landis Award, by bombing Landis award worksites.

In addition to these two plants, shortly after midnight the Harp and Partridge Glass plant was also bombed. A day later, the police held a mass raid on unions across Chicago, arresting somewhere between 100 and 400 labor leader reportedly in connection with the bombings.

In addition to the labor bombings of worksites, the Chicago White Sox's Comisky Park and Chicago Cubs Wrigley Field were targeted. Both were being repainted by non-union Landis award painters and also had connections to Kenesaw Landis himself, as when he wasn't serving as a judge he was a MLB baseball commissioner. Comisky park was bombed once on April 22, 1923, and later on October 14 Wrigley field was bombed. There was also an unexploded bomb found on April 17 outside Chicago Cubs Wrigley Field by police.

The labor bombings continued in the following years. In 1925 alone, 99 bombings had been reported occurring in the city.

==== Tail-end of rent strike ====
Chicago Tribune; October 12, 1921
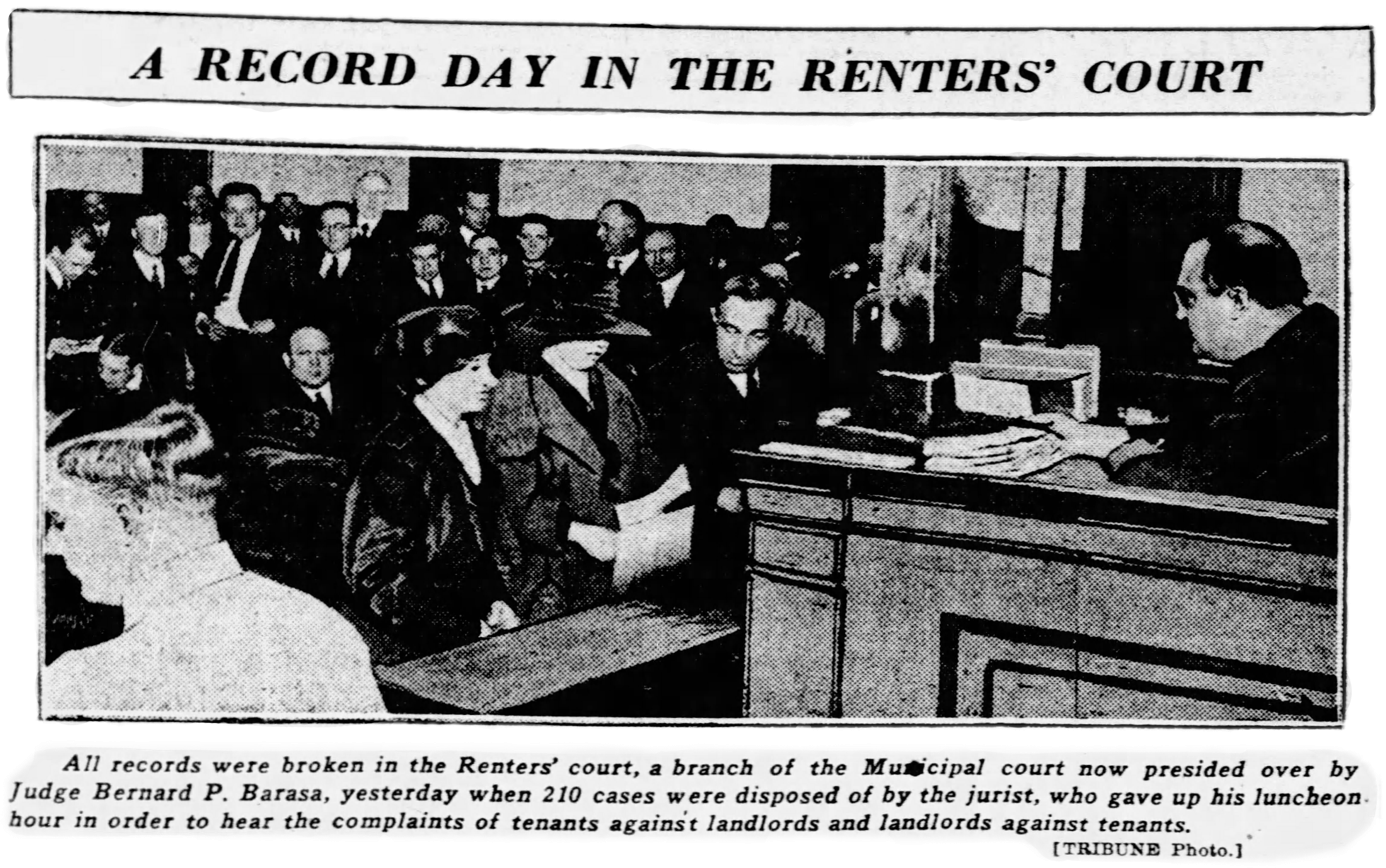

With the passage of the Kessinger Laws, the activity of tenant strikes wound down in the city. Instead tenants relied on taking their cases to court for the 6-month extension of rent at the previous leases rate. The passage of the laws was actively celebrated

On October 11 alone a record 210 rent cases were heard that day. The countrywide housing shortage, caused by WW1 buildup, would also eventually ease.

== Aftermath ==
=== Kessinger laws ===
CTPL Ad; August 7, 1921
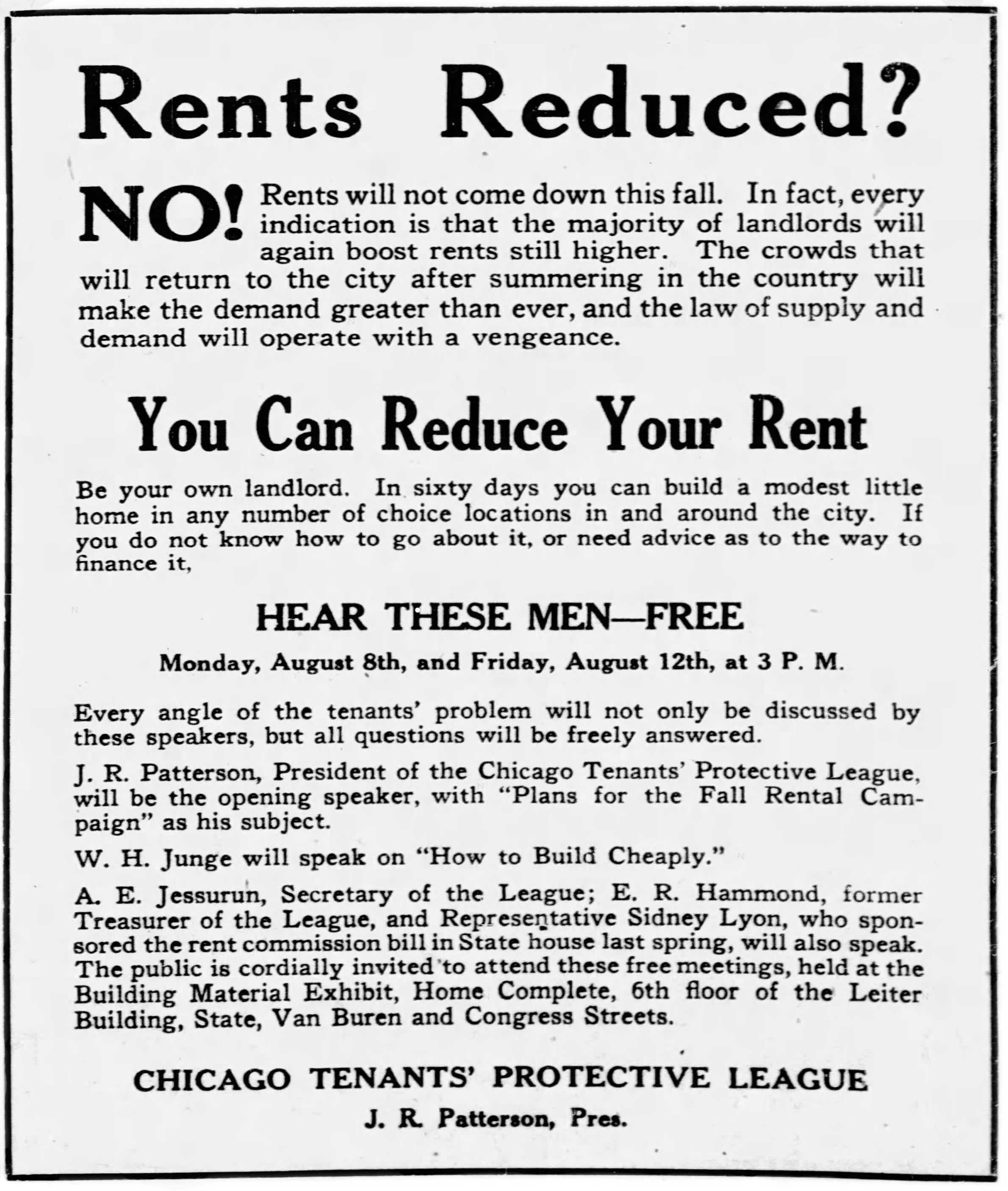

The rent strike precipitated the passage of several laws collectively known as the Kessinger laws. The ones that successfully passed were the following:

- Tenant right to trial by jury, even if waived in the lease.
- To give tenants an automatic 60 day grace period to stay on the property after receiving a notice to vacate.
- To allow judges to grant a six months stay of execution in eviction cases, applying to cities and villages but exempting farm land.

The last of which was considered the most important to tenants, providing significant, if temporary financial relief. In the short term building tenants who participated in the Chicago rent strikes also often won rent concessions and reduction from their landlords.

=== Challenge to labor ===
The rent strikes brought considerable attention to the housing shortage within Chicago, and subsequently at the Chicago building trades through the investigations by the Dailey commission. While not precipitating the 'American Open Shop' plan, organizations such as the Building Construction Employers Association (BCEA), the Associated Builders, utilized the shortage in appealing to middle class city residents in their war on labor. While not successful in destroying labor trade unions within the Chicago, the Landis Award and CCELA still brought a formidable challenge to unions' power within the city. Chicago operated as the testing grounds for what would lead to a mass decline in union membership in the US from 5.1 million in 1920 to 3.6 million in 1929.

=== Heat health ordinance ===
Alongside the Kessinger bill laws, the rent strikes also brought in the passing of the city's first tenant heat laws. A similar provision had been enacted in New York City in 1918 following a prolonged set of rent strikes that lasted into 1920. The fight for a heat law that set a minimum temperature requirement for apartments, began in 1920 when it started going through city council with a minimum of 70 °C year round temperature for flats where landlords provided the heat.

After significant lobbying by the Chicago Board of Realtors (CREB) to weaken the proposed law and the Chicago Tenants League attempting to push back on their attempts; In 1920 the proposed temperature was lowered to 68 °C and only from October 1 to April 1. This change was criticized by the Chicago Tenants League with J. R. Patterson president of the league describing landlords who don't provide proper heat as no different than "thieves and robbers". In addition to the CREB, the Chicago Flat Janitors' union lobbied against a minimum temperature overnight, given it would require them to wake up in the middle of the night to fuel furnaces.

In June 1922, after a previous failure to pass in May; The heat ordinance passed, set to take effect in October.

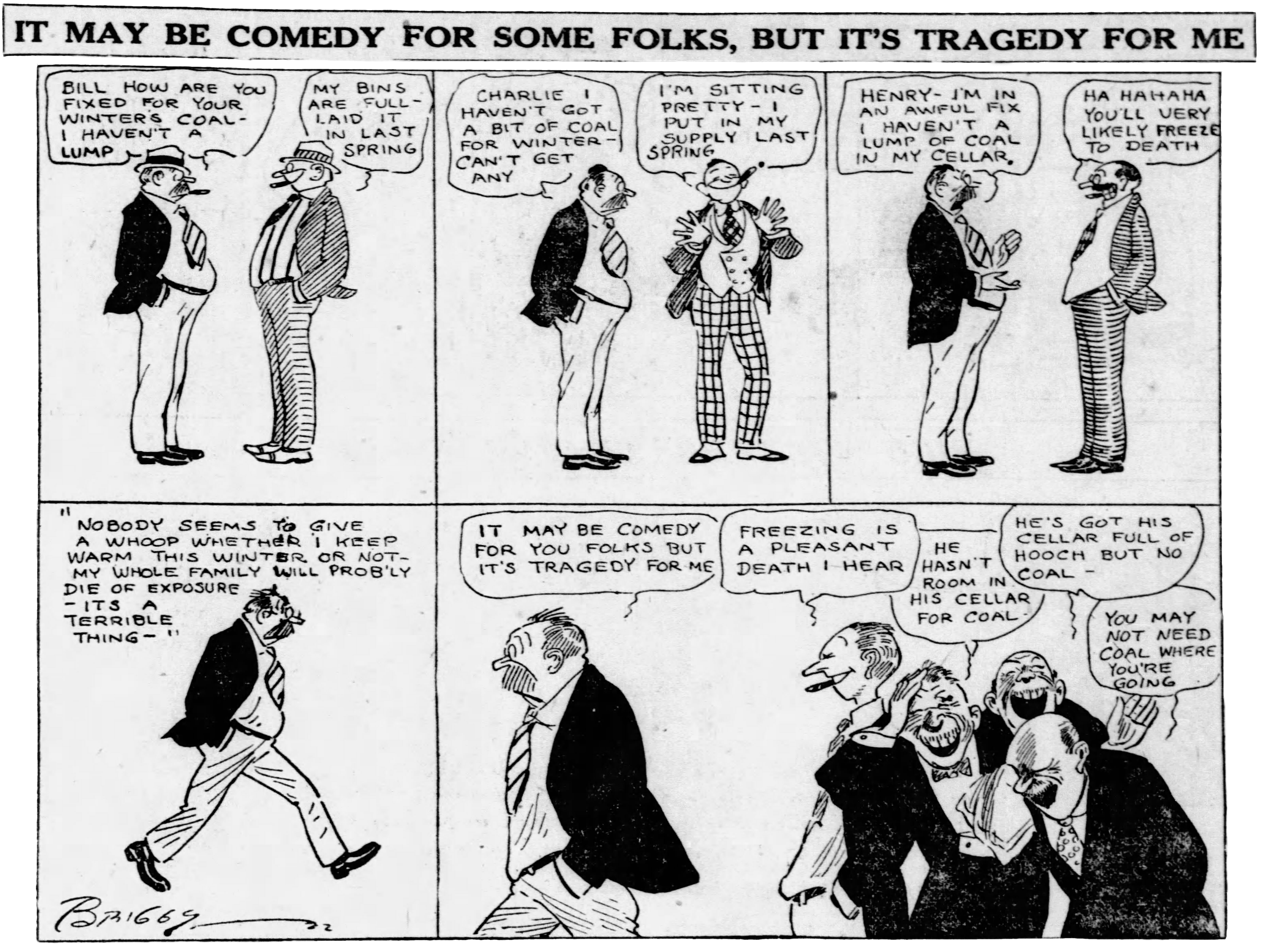
Chicago Tribune; September 20, 1922

The minimum temperature terms (applying from October 1 to April 1) were as follows:

- 6–7:30 am, 60 °F
- 7:30–8:30 am, 65 °F
- 8:30 am–10:30 pm, 68 °F

This heat ordinance remains in effect to the modern day with slight modifications, such as now applying from September 15 to June 1.

An additional aspect of the law was setting a minimum temperature of factories and workshops at 68 °F all day. In September 1922, Chicago was also hit by a cold snap which caused pervasive illness among tenants, but they were left with no legal recourse due to the month limitations of when the law applied in the year. In December, the first court judgements against landlords for violating the heat law were made, with Margert Burke a landlord fined $25 (equivalent to $481 in 2025) and the court costs by the municipal court for the violation.

== See also ==
- US strike wave of 1919
- 2025 Chicago ACTA rent strikes
- Anti-Rent War
