= United States strike wave of 1919 =

Labor unrest following World War I

- Part of the Revolutions of 1917–1923 and the First Red Scare
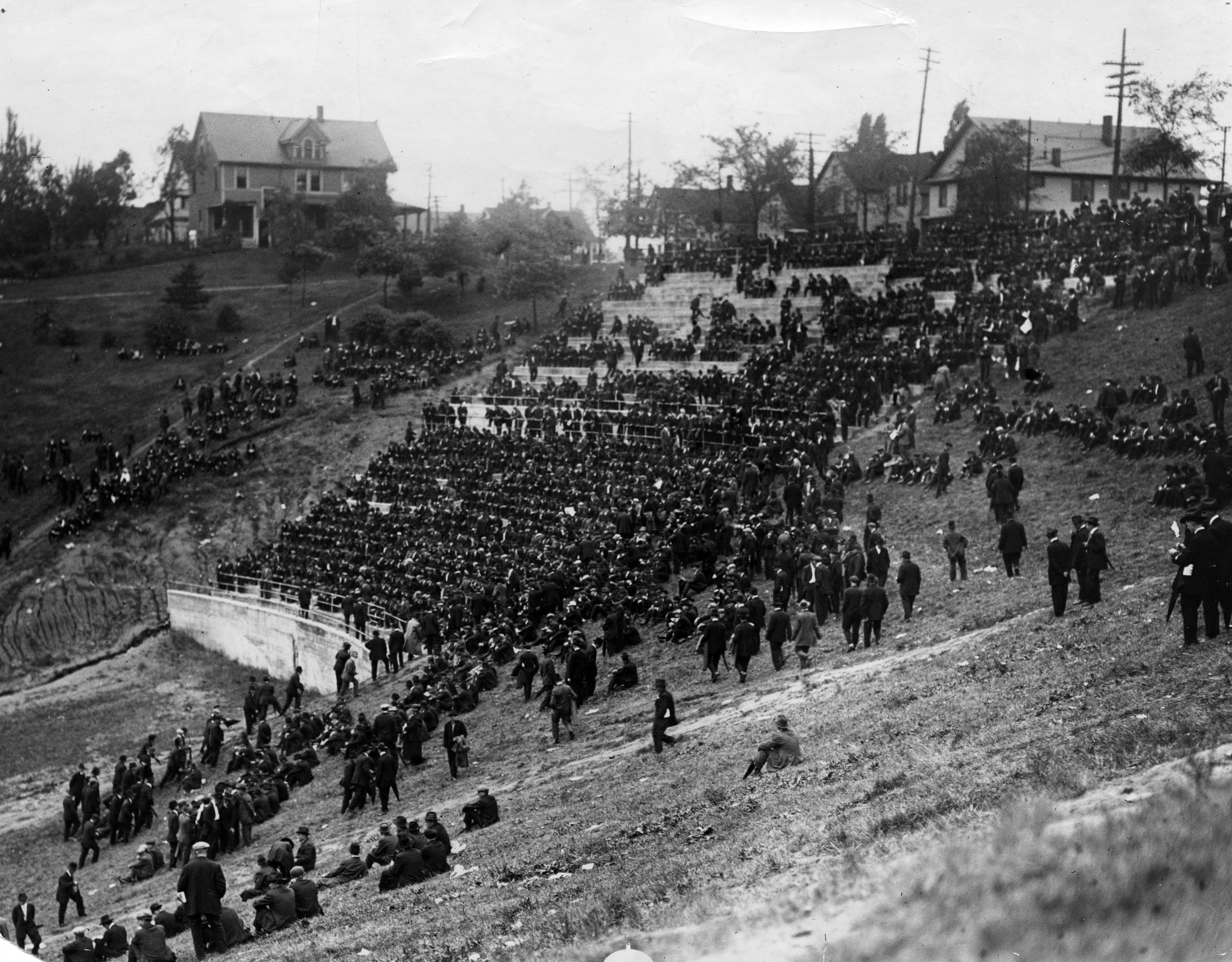
- Mass meeting of Cleveland steel workers in Brookside Park during strike, October 1, 1919
- Date: January 9, 1919 – January 8, 1920
- Location: Nationwide
- Methods: Strikes, riots, protests

Parties
Strikers: Industrial Workers of the World; Socialist Party of America; American Federation of Labor; Amalgamated Association of Iron, Steel and Tin Workers; United Mine Workers; Actors' Equity Association; Communist Labor Party of America; Anarchists	Government; U.S. Federal Government; U.S. Steel; Pacific Electric; Other companies

Lead figures
John Fitzpatrick; Charles Ruthenberg; William Z. Foster; Mother Jones; John L. Lewis; Eugene V. Debs (Note: Imprisoned since June 30, 1918) "Big Bill" Haywood	Woodrow Wilson; A. Mitchell Palmer; Elbert Gary; Henry E. Huntington; William Gibbs McAdoo

The United States strike wave of 1919 was a succession of extensive labor strikes following World War I that unfolded across various American industries, involving more than four million American workers. This significant post-war labor mobilization marked a critical juncture in the nation's industrial landscape, with widespread strikes reflecting the heightened socioeconomic tensions and the burgeoning demand for improved working conditions and fair labor practices.

== Background ==
During World War I, the period witnessed a notable increase in strike activity, with the average number of workers participating in strikes each year from 1916 to 1918 being 2.4 times higher than in 1915.} This upsurge laid the groundwork for the subsequent strike wave of 1919, as workers began to grasp the influence they could exert over production through collective actions. The economic backdrop further fueled discontent, with the cost of living in the United States nearly doubling from August 1915 to August 1919.

The aftermath of the war also introduced a complex sociopolitical environment. The success of the 1917 Russian Revolution found resonance among certain radical factions within U.S. unions. Concurrently, concerns among business and government leaders intensified, driven by a perception that existing industrial relations faced a unified challenge from what they regarded as a 'Bolshevist' conspiracy. The 1919 Seattle General Strike, partly inspired by the Russian Revolution, served as a manifestation of these tensions, contributing to the overall atmosphere of unrest.

== The strikes ==
After the war, following the end of wartime price controls and laxing of government regulation against union busting, the cost of living rose significantly. This led to anger among workers and subsequently large strikes.

Some notable strikes in 1919 include:

- 15,000 New York City Harbor workers (January 9 – April 20, 1919)
- 35,000 New York City garment workers (January 21, 1919 – )
- 120,000 New England textile workers (February 3, 1919 – May 20, 1919)
- 65,000 Seattle workers (February 6 – 11, 1919)
- +9,000 New England telephone operators (April 15, 1919 – April 21, 1919)
- +12,000 California telephone workers (June 18, 1919 – )
- Los Angeles streetcar workers (August 1 – 6, 1919)
- Actors' Equity Association strike (August 7 – September 6, 1919)
- Boston Police Strike (September 9 - September 13, 1919)
- 365,000 steel workers (September 22 – January 8, 1920)
- +70,000 New York longshoremen workers (October 9, 1919 – )
- 394,000 coal workers (November 1 – December 10, 1919)

== Reactions ==
There was both support and opposition to numerous strikes across the country, resulting in various state and federal responses. In the midst of the Seattle strikes, Mayor Ole Hanson called upon Secretary of War Newton Baker to deploy federal troops to threaten strikers to return to work. Additional federal actions were taken by President Woodrow Wilson and his administration, empowered by Congress passing the Lever Act in 1917, granting the president the authority to manage food and fuel distribution. This allowed the president and his administration to engage directly with many large unions nationwide, aiming to prevent strikes and imposing fines, such as the United States Fuel Administration penalizing striking coal miners in Indiana with a $1 fine.

Worker divisions were widespread, with native and immigrant workers often at odds as employers utilized propaganda to exploit racial tensions among some white native workers. Riots erupted in several cities, including the Cleveland May Day Riot, where tensions escalated due to a series of strikes leading to conflicts between unionists and leftists, as well as anti-communist and anti-unionist residents.

== Conclusion and aftermath ==
Number of workers involved in US strikes each year according to the U.S. BLS, 1919 strike wave in purple

The results of the strikes were varied:

- The UMW coal strike was a success, winning a 14% wage increase.
- The steel strike was a crushing defeat without winning their demands and causing almost no union organizing to occur in the sector for the next 15 years.
- The New England telephone strike was a victory, winning wage increases.

In broad trends, the number of strikes began to decline from their peak in 1919 as the United States war economy transitioned. The labor market tightened with the return of veterans, the resumption of immigration, economic contraction leading to two separate recessions, and rising prices. These factors contributed to diminishing bargaining power for many workers, given the tightening job markets. The federal government, no longer protecting unions, dismantled its wartime labor agencies, enabling companies to resume union-busting efforts. The strike wave struggled to sustain continual growth and concessions due to state and federal governments actively suppressing strikes, both through military intervention and by invoking the fear of Bolshevism following the Russian Revolution. This overall wave of strikes has been speculated to have played a role in the emergence and intensity of the First Red Scare.

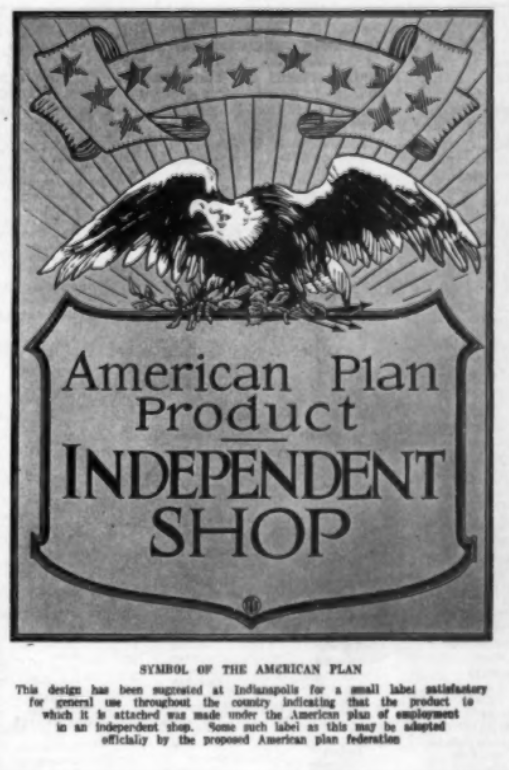
'American Plan' open shop logo

World War I had also dramatically shifted the economic and political position of the United States on the international stage. Becoming the wealthiest country at the time and in turn dramatically shifting the position of US business owners; giving them more power in shaping industries and loaning foreign capital. As such following the end of the war, an 'attack' on organized labor began with increased anti-union and open shop efforts, coming to prominence in 1920. This significantly decreased the negotiating power of labor unions following the end of the war.

Following the onset of the Great Migration, significant amounts of African Americans migrated to the industrial north. In some cities, they were hired as strikebreakers, especially during the strikes of 1917 and 1919 as it was one of the few ways for them to secure jobs. This development triggered new racial tensions, largely instigated by white workers. The Red Summer also occurred in 1919, a set of white supremacist terrorism, and racially motivated attacks against Black Americans within the US.

== See also ==
- List of striking United States workers by year
- List of United States strikes by size
- United States strike wave of 1945–1946
