= Baird & Warner =

Real estate company in Chicago

Baird & Warner is a residential real estate services company based in Chicago, Illinois.

== Overview ==
Baird & Warner serves the Chicago metro area. It is one of the largest independent brokerage in Chicago and its suburbs, with over 2,300 real estate brokers and 29 sales offices found across Northeastern Illinois. Baird & Warner also offers loan services through Key Mortgage Services, Inc. and title insurance and attorneys through Baird & Warner Title Services.

== Early years ==
Baird & Warner was founded in on March 28, 1855 in Chicago. The company's first recorded transaction was a $5,000 loan to Edward Casey & Brothers, taking security mortgages on property along Washington Street in downtown Chicago. The firm began as a partnership between Lucious Olmsted and Lyman Baird of New Haven, Connecticut.

Lucious Olmsted died shortly after in 1862 and Baird invited Francis Bradley - also of New Haven, Connecticut - to join the firm. The company was then known as Baird & Bradley. The partners worked with East Coast investors to channel millions of dollars to the developing city, including the purchase of land for Chicago's major train station, Union Station.

== The Great Chicago Fire ==
In 1871, Baird & Bradley was located at 90 LaSalle Street. When the Great Chicago Fire burned most of Chicago, the only thing that was left of the office was the fireproof safe containing the company ledgers. These documents helped Chicago officials verify property ownership after the city's records were destroyed.

After the Fire, Lyman Baird and Francis Bradley further encouraged out-of-state investors to send more money to assist the rebirth of Chicago. Investors put up nearly $140 million to cover to cost of reconstruction, and this incredible support created such a sustained building boom that it cushioned the worst effects of the financial panic of 1873.

== The Early 20th Century ==
After the death of Francis Bradley, Lyman Baird named his son Wyllys Baird and son-in-law George L. Warner to head the company in 1893. From then on the firm was known as Baird & Warner. As the population of Chicago began to increase, Baird & Warner became active in subdivision development in areas like Englewood and Uptown.

Wyllys Baird died in 1928 during the prosperous 1920s, and his son Warner G. Baird took over the company.

== Post-World War II ==
The results of the Great Depression caused Baird & Warner to change business models. After World War II, special home loans for veterans and the growth of the Chicago suburbs presented the opportunity for the company to move into the residential sales industry. Baird & Warner expanded to 10 sales offices throughout the area by 1950.

In 1954, fourth generation Baird family member John W. Baird became vice president of the company.

== Fair Housing ==
John Baird succeeded his father as president in 1963, the same year he helped lead the fight for open-housing in Chicago. As leader of the Metropolitan Housing and Planning Council from 1959 to 1963, he advocated for laws ending racial discrimination in home sales. When the Chicago Real Estate Board disagreed - an organization which his great-grandfather helped create - he resigned in protest. Baird's fight for fair housing eventually led to these laws being passed.

== Urban Renewal ==
John Baird was instrumental in developing abandoned portions of the city of Chicago throughout the 1970s - particularly the Printer's Row area in the South Loop. Buildings that were at one point used for the printing industry were abandoned. John Baird led the redevelopment of these buildings, including the city's first loft conversion - that of the 22-story Transportation Building at 600 S. Dearborn St. into 300 apartments.

== Fifth Generation Baird ==
Fifth-generation Baird family member Stephen W. Baird joined the company and later took over as president in 1991, and he still serves as president and CEO today.

== 150th Anniversary ==
Baird & Warner celebrated its 150th anniversary on March 28, 2005, and on January 31, 2005, Chicago Mayor Richard M. Daley issued a proclamation that March 28 would be known as Baird & Warner Day in Chicago.

== Top Workplace ==
Baird & Warner was named the number one top workplace in the Chicago area in 2017, 2015, and 2014, earning its sixth consecutive Chicago Tribune Top Workplace Award. The brokerage was named the second best large company to work for in the Chicago area in 2016 and 2013 and the third best workplace in 2012.
