= Harold C. Kessinger =

American legislator

Harold C. Kessinger was an American newspaper editor and publisher, lecturer, and state legislator in Illinois. He was elected to the Illinois House of Representatives in 1914 and then the Illinois Senate in 1916, 1920, and 1924. He edited the Mid-West Review and published The Organized Farmer.

He attended Blackburn College, Northwestern University and the University of Chicago. He lived in Aurora, Illinois.

He was a Republican.

He was advertised as America's Boy Lecturer. He wrote on economic and business matters.

Later in his life he lived in Ridgewood, New Jersey.
