= Holdover rent penalty =

Concept in landlord–tenant law

In some jurisdictions, a holdover rent penalty may be charged when a tenant remains in a housing unit after the end date of their lease agreement. This penalty is commonly double the rental rate the tenant was paying during the term of their lease, and may be referred to as "double rent." The specific circumstances under which a landlord may charge a holdover rent penalty vary between jurisdictions.

== Definition ==
Holdover tenants are tenants who stay past the end date on their lease. Holdover rent penalties exist in some jurisdictions and may be issued when a tenant remains in possession of a unit after the final date of a lease term.

=== United States ===
Most lease agreements include provisions describing tenants "at sufferance." A tenant at sufferance is a tenant who remains in possession of a unit following the final date of the lease term. If no such provision is included in a lease agreement, then state law applies as applicable. Landlords have different options for what to do if they have holdover tenants living in their units.

Most US states give landlords the right to let holdover tenants stay in the units on a month-to-month basis or evict them, however, the specifics vary state-to-state, or even by city in some cases. Holdover tenancy in and of itself may be grounds for eviction on the basis that the tenant is violating the terms of their lease agreement In some jurisdictions, a landlord may have the right to include a provision that charges tenants at sufferance a penalty that may be more than the original rental rate.

==== Florida ====
In Florida, if a tenant remains in possession of a unit, their lease has expired and they have not renewed the lease, then they are considered a tenant at sufferance. At the end of each month after which the lease has the expired and the tenant refuses to leave, the landlord has the right to collect 200% of the rental rate, in what's referred to as holdover rent. If the landlord subsequently accepts the holdover rent and agrees in writing to let the tenant continue living there, the tenant returns to being a tenant at will.

===== New York State =====
In New York State, if a tenant says they will leave a unit by a certain date and stays past it, the landlord may charge them 200% of the rental rate. Conversely, in Illinois, is a landlord requests in writing that a tenant leave by a certain date and the tenant fails to do so, they may charge the tenant double rent.

=== United Kingdom ===
In the United Kingdom, when a tenant serves their landlord a notice to quit, they give a date on which they intend to vacate the property. If the tenant stays on the property past that date, the Distress for Rent Act of 1737 provides the landlord with the right to charge twice the rental rate for the extra days they spent in the unit. This is referred to as "double rent."
