= American Plan (union negotiations) =

1920s plan for refusing to negotiate with trades unions

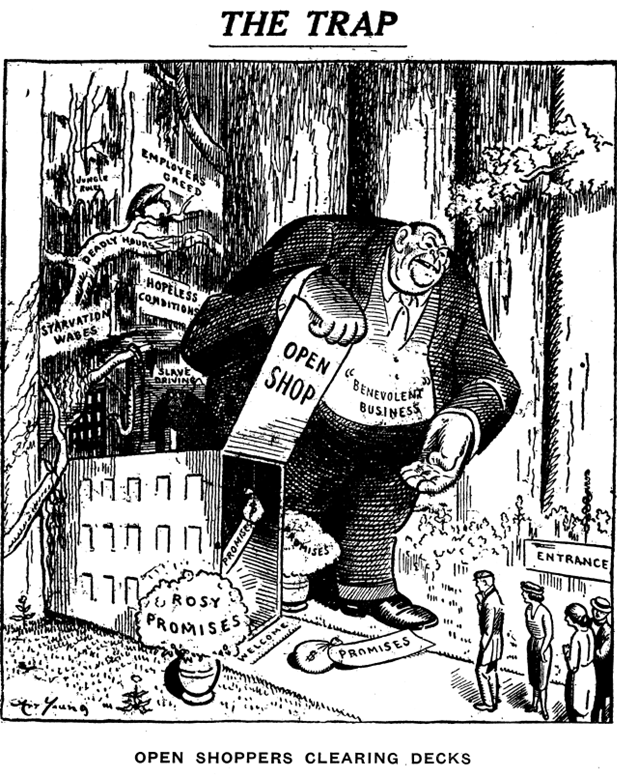
1927 comic from the Labor Age Adjacent to article criticizing employers open shop drives and the American Plan Conference effects on workers well-being.

The American Plan is the term used to refer to open shop strategies pursued by employers in the United States in the 1920s. The American Plan deemed unions to be "un-American," and the resulting anti-union efforts of employers decreased union membership and efficacy until the 1930s. During World War I, U.S. Steel took a strong anti-union stance in its Chicago mills, calling union organizers "German propagandists." U.S. Steel also required that steelworkers sign a "Pledge of Patriotism," promising not to strike.

The National Association of Manufacturers (NAM) endorsed the anti-union strategy in 1920. The term, American Plan, comes from a meeting of anti-union employers held in Chicago in 1921. The employers agreed not to negotiate with unions, and to require that employees sign a pledge that they would not join a union. Some hardline employers refused to recognize or negotiate with union leaders, and some boycotted unionized vendors and refused to sell supplies to striking employees. In some highly unionized cities, NAM members would fund deputized armed "patrols." While ostensibly charged with keeping the peace, these "imported thugs" were accused of intimidating striking workers and breaking up peaceful demonstrations by force. They would also pursue court-ordered injunctions against labor leaders, such as Illinois labor leader Reuben Soderstrom, to prevent them from organizing protests. When Soderstrom and his fellow Labor Council members protested, they were issued injunctions and charged with conspiracy. The American Plan implied a connection between union activity and the Bolsheviks and played on fears during the First Red Scare.

As a result, the American Plan drove down union membership by at least 25% between 1921 and 1923. From companies' participation in the American Plan, as well as anti-union decisions from the Supreme Court of the United States, union membership fell from 5.1 million in 1920 to 3.6 million in 1929. In the 1930s, successful organizing drives by industrial unions weakened the American Plan, and employer resistance to unions.

American Plan: Product label insignias

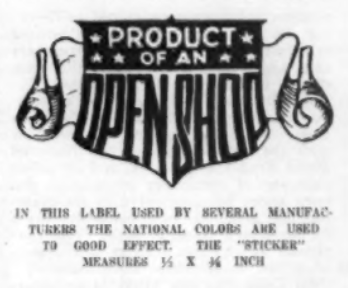

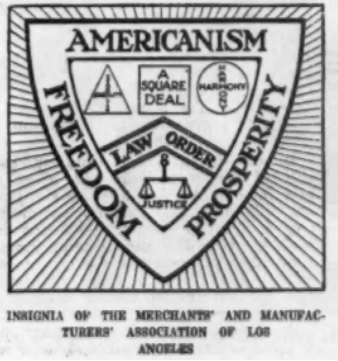

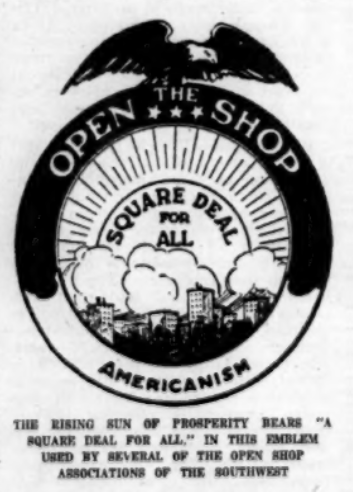

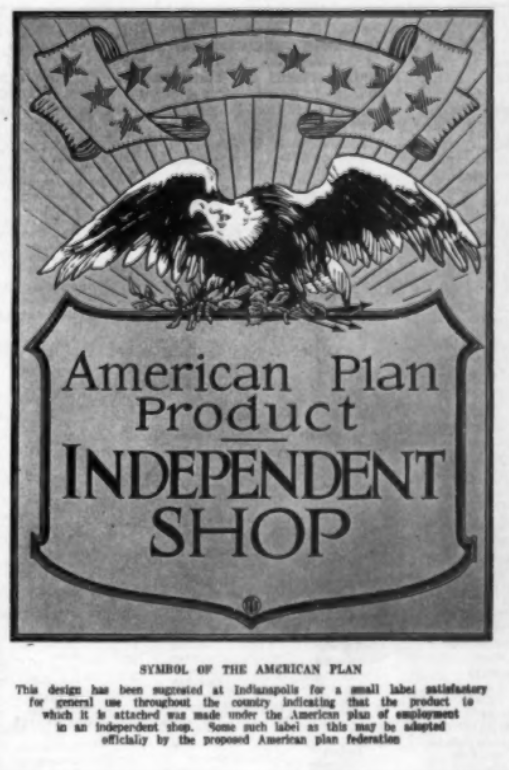

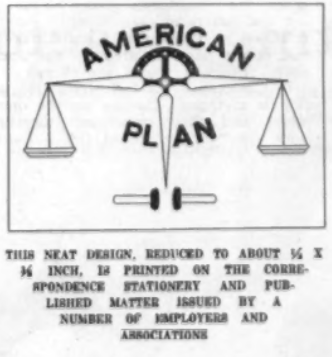

== See also ==
- US Strike wave of 1919
- Kenesaw Mountain Landis § Building trades award, controversy, and resignation (1920–1922)
