= List of call centre companies =

The following is a list of notable call centre companies:

Company	Founded	Employees	Revenue	Locations
Atento	1999	154,000		
Concentrix	1983	290,000+[3]	US$5.3 billion (2020)	
Conduent	2017	31,000 (2021)	US$4.140 billion (2021)^{[3]}	22 countries^{[1]} (2021)
Contact Centre Cymru	2005			
Convergys Corporation				
Datacom Group	1965	6,973 (2022) ^{[4]}	NZ$1.45 billion (2,022)^{[1]}	23
DialAmerica	1957	5,000^{[1]}		
Firstsource	2001	27000+^{[4]}	₹50,780 million (US$640 million)^{[3]: 8}	
Focus Services				
Genpact				
Hinduja Global Solutions				
InfoCision Management Corporation				
iQor				
Minacs				
NCO Group				
Qualfon				
Sitel				
Sykes Enterprises				
SupportSave				
Tech Mahindra				
Teleperformance				
TeleTech				
Televerde				
TELUS International				
Transcom WorldWide				
WNS Global Services				
Webhelp				
Wipro Ltd				
Whistl				
