= Bootstrap Network =

The Bootstrap Network is an organization of entrepreneurs founded in Austin, Texas in 2003 by Bijoy Goswami. The members, who are all founders of companies, give each other advice on building companies, the name referring to starting a company without outside financing, or 'bootstrapping'.

By 2006, the network had over 500 members in Austin and sister networks in 10 other cities in the US and India. By 2009, it had 1,000 members. Gary Hoover, founder of Hoover's and Bookstop has called Bootstrap Austin "among the most effective tools for entrepreneurs that I have ever seen - and I've seen a lot."
