= Patrick Spain =

Entrepreneur

Patrick J. Spain (born 1952) is a serial entrepreneur. He is currently the co-founder and CEO of First Stop Health, LLC., a Chicago-based provider of telemedicine services. He is also the Executive Chairman and co-founder of the news curation site Newser. Spain is the former chairman and CEO Hoover's, which he co-founded; and the founder and former CEO of HighBeam Research. Hoover's was sold to Dun & Bradstreet in 2003, and HighBeam Research was purchased by Cengage Learning in 2008.

== History ==
Spain attended the University of Chicago and graduated with a bachelor of arts degree in Ancient Roman History in 1974. He worked for Gladstone Associates, now part of Accenture from 1974 to 1977. He subsequently attended law school at Boston University, and graduated in 1979. Intrigued by the opportunities in the emerging intersection of information and technology, Spain then joined the Extel Corporation, a telex manufacturer, as an associate counsel. At the university, he met Gary Hoover.

Spain worked at Extel for ten years in various positions, including General Counsel, VP of Administration, and VP, Mergers & Acquisitions. During this period, Spain provided some of the initial capital for the creation of Bookstop, a company founded by his friend Gary Hoover.

In 1990 he moved to Austin, Texas, where he and University of Chicago friends Gary Hoover and Alan Chai, along with Alta Campbell, founded Hoover's. The Company initially produced a printed directory, which profiled 540 of the most important companies in the world but soon emphasized electronic distribution, and at its inception, Hoover's began exploring the electronic distribution of its detailed company profiles. Hoover's subsequently concluded licensing deals with Lexis-Nexis, Bloomberg and in 1993 with America Online. In 1994, Hoover's launched its website, www.hoovers.com. The wide exposure provided by America Online and the Company website, led to Hoover's rapid growth, with a public stock offering in 1999. Spain was CEO from 1992 to 2001 and chairman from 2001 to 2002.

Spain remained on Hoover's Board until the Company was sold to Dun & Bradstreet in 2003. In 2002, Spain started what would become HighBeam Research, an online subscription research service that provides users with access to tens of millions of articles from thousands of newspapers, magazines, and journals. In December 2008, HighBeam was sold to Cengage Learning. Spain launched Newser within HighBeam but separated the two entities prior to the sale of HighBeam. Newser is an advertising-based online news site that curates and summarizes news in a highly visual format. It has an audience of approximately 4 million readers. His partner at Newser is Michael Wolff.

In the decade starting in 2004, Spain served as a Director of GuideStar, an innovator in transparency matters for the non-profit industry; SmartAnalyst, a company that provides sophisticated analyses for the life sciences industry; and Televerde, a socially progressive telemarketing automation company. In 2013, he became a Director at Owler, an innovator in company-related content started by Jigsaw founder Jim Fowler, where he continues to serve on the Board. He is also a Director of Community Health, the largest free health clinic in Chicago, and a Governor of Opportunity International, the oldest and largest microlender in the world; and Chairman of the Library Council at the University of Chicago.

In 2012, Spain, Dr. Mark Friedman, and Ken Anderson founded First Stop Health. Friedman, an Emergency Medicine physician, was a classmate of Spain's at the University of Chicago. Spain's interest in creating First Stop Health arose from his own unsatisfactory experience with the healthcare system when a member of his family experienced a serious illness. This ignited his desire to make patient access to quality healthcare more convenient and affordable.

His father, James W. Spain, was a career foreign service officer and a U.S. ambassador to Tanzania, Turkey, and Sri Lanka. Spain was born in Pakistan and grew up in Turkey and Washington, D.C.
