= Colonial Plaza =

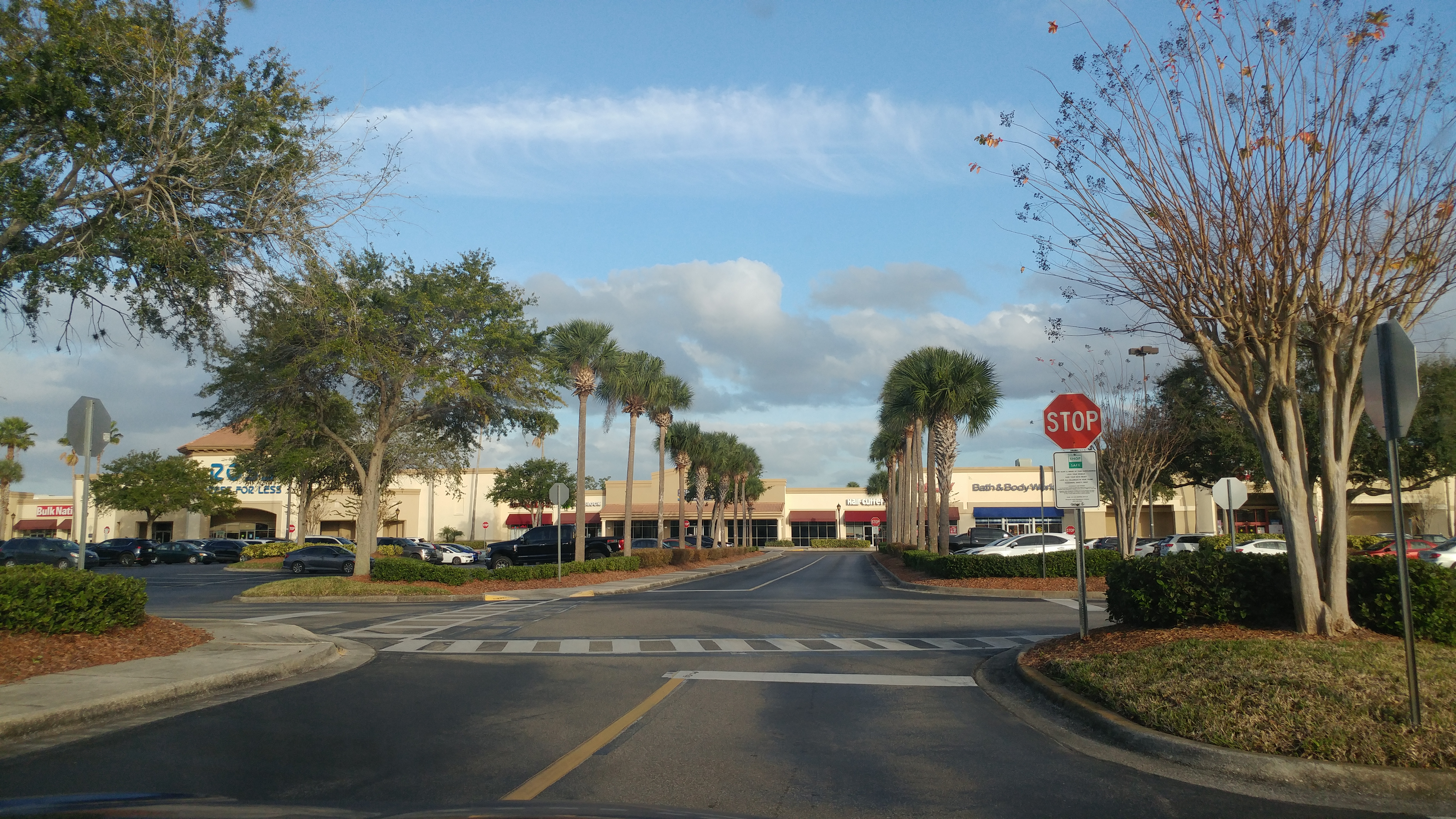
- Colonial Plaza in January 2020
- Location: Orlando, Florida, U.S.
- Coordinates: 28°33′01″N 81°20′59″W
- Address: 601 North Bumby Avenue
- Opened: January 31, 1956; 70 years ago
- Closed: 1995 (original mall)
- Developer: R. M. Thompson Co.
- Owner: Weingarten Realty
- Architect: Morris Lapidus
- Num. of stores: 50+
- Num. of anchor tenants: 15+
- Floor area: 497,693 square feet (46,237.2 m^{2})
- Floors: 1
- Public transit: 6, 13, 51, 313 at the Colonial Plaza SuperStop

Colonial Plaza is a shopping mall in Orlando, Florida, United States. Opened in 1956, it was the largest retail development in the state of Florida at the time of its construction. The original complex included two supermarkets and two variety stores, plus a Belk department store. It underwent multiple expansions in its history, the first of which added a Jordan Marsh department store and an enclosed mall concourse. Further expansion in 1973 added a second enclosed wing and a relocation of Belk, while Ivey's was added in 1983 and sold to Dillard's in 1990.

The center's vacancy increased in the early 1990s due to competition from Orlando Fashion Square and complexities with the property's layout, with Jordan Marsh, Dillard's, and Belk all closing between 1991 and 1995. A renovation between 1995 and 1996 restructured the complex into an open-air power center. Since 2001, it has been owned and managed by Weingarten Realty. Major tenants include Total Wine & More, Hobby Lobby, Ross Dress for Less, Staples, Bealls Outlet, Marshalls, Old Navy, Barnes & Noble, and Petco.

== History ==
Groundbreaking for Colonial Plaza began in mid-1954. The site chosen for the center was the corner of Colonial Drive (Florida State Road 50) and Bumby Avenue, on land previously used as a cow pasture. Overall construction costs were estimated at $3,000,000 (equivalent to $35,966,543 in 2025). Morris Lapidus served as architect, while development, construction, contracting, and engineering were handled by the R. M. Thompson Co. of Clearwater. The firm of Michael R. Sudakow financed the project and Howard D. Spencer handled leasing. At the time, it was the largest retail development in the state of Florida. Representatives of the Sudakow firm said that the site for the center was chosen because they felt that Orlando, being in the center of the state, was poised for significant growth in population and retail development. The specific location was chosen because of its proximity to the Orlando market's center of population at the time.

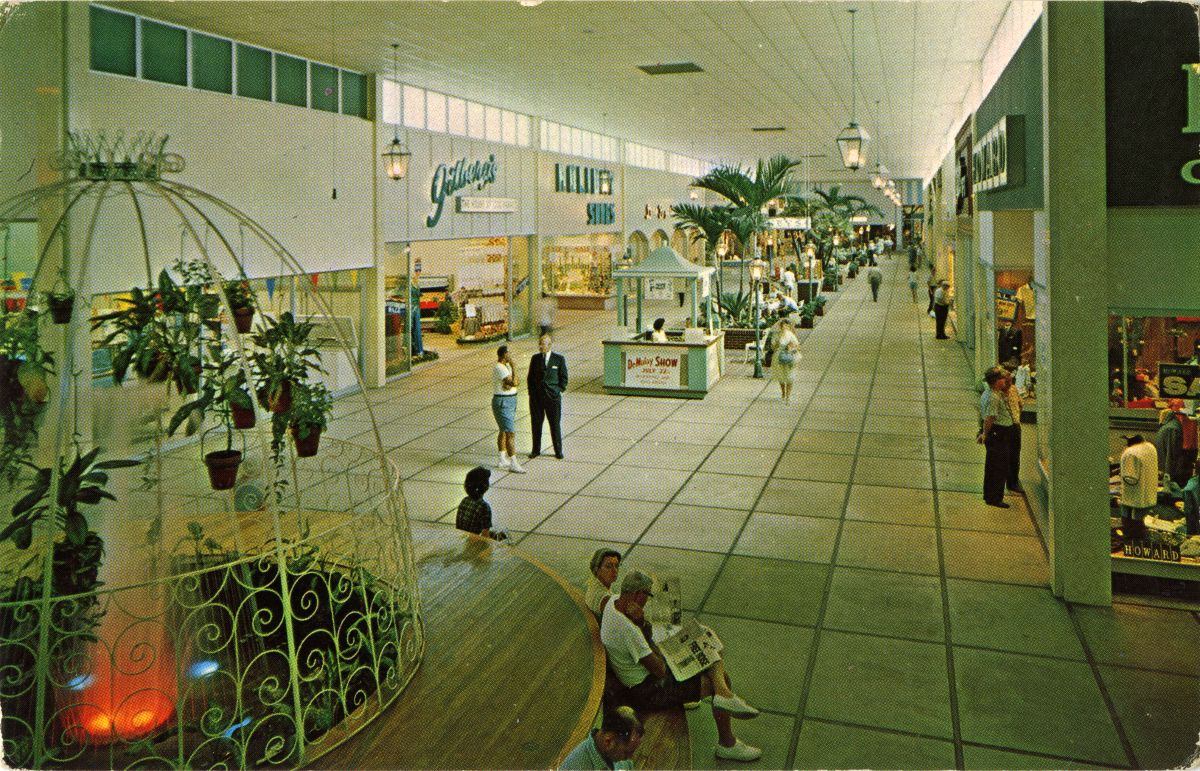
The interior mall of Colonial Plaza in the 1960s.

Colonial Plaza opened for business on January 31, 1956. The center included two supermarkets: a 22,000-square-foot (2,000 m^{2}) Publix, described by The Orlando Sentinel as the "largest supermarket in central Florida", and A&P, whose store was described by that chain's vice-president of operations for the Southeastern United States area as "large enough to serve the needs of residents in the east area of Orlando." Two variety store chains also had locations in the center: W. T. Grant, whose 31,000-square-foot (2,900 m^{2}) location was their second in the Orlando area, and a smaller McCrory, which was the forty-first in the state of Florida. Other notable tenants upon opening included a dry cleaner, a shoe repair shop, a television and appliance store, a camera shop, and several local clothing stores. It also featured a Walgreens pharmacy which had relocated from downtown Orlando, and two national shoe stores: Kinney Shoes and Thom McAn. All of the stores opened to a specially designed sidewalk, which was tinted green to reduce glare, and protected by overhangs from each store. The center's parking lot had over 2,000 spaces, and was illuminated by mercury-vapor lamps. Overall, the center had a total of 20 acres (8.1 ha) of shop space at the time, with over 24 shops in total. Opening ceremonies included presentations from city dignitaries and a United States Marine Corps color guard, performances by a local band, free candy for all patrons, and a prize drawing with a grand prize of a Plymouth Plaza. More than 50,000 shoppers were predicted to visit on opening day, with an estimated average of 10 cars using each parking spot daily. Two months after the rest of the center opened, a 75,000-square-foot (7,000 m^{2}) Belk department store opened as well. It was the largest department store in Orlando at the time, including departments for men's, women's, and children's clothing and footwear, along with jewelry, gardening, sporting goods, patio furniture, a key and lock shop, and a sandwich shop.

=== 1960s–1970s: First expansion ===
In 1961 and 1962, the center underwent its first expansion, consisting of 30 new storefronts facing an enclosed, air-conditioned mall concourse, and ending in a 230,000-square-foot (21,000 m^{2}) Jordan Marsh department store. This expansion increased the size of the property to 600,000 square feet (56,000 m^{2}) and over 57 stores, making it the largest shopping center in Florida at the time. Jordan Marsh's store featured a mix of "tropical colors" and pastel tones, along with Venetian glass and rosewood paneling. Jordan Marsh had originally wanted to locate downtown, but chose to locate at Colonial Plaza instead as the property owners of their intended downtown location had raised their rates. It was also the first four-story department store in Orlando, and flight attendants of Eastern Air Lines were present to instruct shoppers on the use of escalators. The enclosed portion began at the existing strip's middle, extending backward from W. T. Grant to the Jordan Marsh store along a 461-foot (141 m) corridor of stores. It was decorated with lampposts, lanterns, planters with palm trees, and brick and redwood flooring. To accommodate the expansion, the parking lot was expanded to a capacity of 15,000 cars. The majority of the stores in this section were local and regional stores, except for 5-7-9 and Lane Bryant. Clinton Gamble was the architect of this expansion, and construction was handled by Frank J. Rooney of Fort Lauderdale. Costs of the expansion were estimated at $2,900,000 (equivalent to $31,244,432 in 2025). To accommodate for the anticipation of increased shopping mall traffic, a traffic light was installed on Colonial Drive and Coy Drive, the next intersection to the east of Bumby Avenue and closest to main mall access from Colonial Drive. Following this expansion, Sudakow announced that a 1,200-seat movie theater (now occupied by The Plaza Live, a performance hall) would be built by Florida State Theaters Inc. on an outparcel facing Bumby Avenue.

Colonial Plaza marked a shift in shopping patterns for the Orlando market, as many major retailers that had been previously operational downtown had moved either to it or to other suburban developments. Among the stores to move out of downtown Orlando in favor of a suburban location was Sears, which built across from the plaza in 1963. In late 1965 and early 1966, the shopping center held a "birthday sale" honoring the center's tenth year of business, which included mall-wide sales, a petting zoo, and an exhibition on gems and minerals. At the time, Spencer noted that the center drew shoppers from a 100-mile radius, and that further growth around the property had ensued, including a Goodyear tire service center, a bank, and a bowling alley.

=== 1970s–1980s: South Mall and Ivey's ===
A second expansion was announced in 1972, consisting of a second mall concourse behind the Jordan Marsh store, and leading to a newer, larger Belk department store. This expansion, known as the South Mall, would bring the mall's overall size to 800,000 square feet (74,000 m^{2}) and over 100 shops, and had a projected cost of $6,000,000 (equivalent to $46,181,384 in 2025). Coinciding with this expansion, the existing property was refurbished with new lighting, floors, and ceilings. The new location of Belk and the South Mall both opened in 1973. Among the new tenants in the South Mall were Casual Corner, Waldenbooks, Spencer Gifts, and relocations of Kinney Shoes and 5-7-9. The new Belk location had more than double the floor space of its prior location, reflecting the company's move toward larger stores. Store managers noted that the new location would carry more women's designer clothing and sportswear, in addition to furs and year-round sales of swimsuits. The expansion of Colonial Plaza coincided with several other retail developments throughout the area, including another mall, Orlando Fashion Square, which was built around the existing Sears store across Colonial Drive. An Orlando Sentinel article said that in 1972, prior to the opening of the expansion, Colonial Plaza had seen over 10.4 million visitors, who had spent approximately $60,000,000 (equivalent to $461,813,842 in 2025). The sudden increase in retail developments in the Orlando market in the early 1970s was seen by retail analysts as the result of a heavy increase in tourism and overall population growth for the entire Orlando region following the opening of Walt Disney World in 1971.

Once the new Belk opened, their previous location in Colonial Plaza was converted to O. G. Wilson's, a catalog showroom chain then owned by the Zale Corporation, in 1974. A year later, W. T. Grant filed for bankruptcy and closed all of its stores. Their location at Colonial Plaza was sold to the F. W. Woolworth Company, who opened there in early 1977. This Woolworth location was based on a prototype introduced at a store in Miami in 1972, offering a wider variety of merchandise than its usual stores and featuring a 140-seat restaurant. Another expansion was announced in 1982. This expansion consisted of a two-story, 85,200 square feet (7,920 m^{2}) Ivey's department store, which would connect to the existing property in front of Woolworth via a 45-foot (14 m)-wide hallway lined with kiosks. In addition, the mall's parking lot was redesigned and re-landscaped, while the original strip of stores and the O. G. Wilson building were given new facades. Ivey's representatives had first wanted to locate at the mall in 1979, but negotiations were delayed due to two factors: Prudential Financial and J. J. Gumberg Co. both purchasing the mall from its original owners Michael R. Sudakow Corporation in 1980, and concerns from existing mall tenants over potential obstruction of visibility due to the addition of the new store. Upon opening in 1983, the new Ivey's had the largest opening-day sales in the chain's history. Mall merchants noted that the presence of construction workers and equipment caused a temporary decrease in traffic, which was compounded when a fire broke out in the mall and destroyed the merchandise of four stores, causing $1 million (equivalent to $3,232,543 in 2025) in damage. The most damage was concentrated on the Jarman Shoes store, which operated from a temporary location until its store was rebuilt in March 1984. Also affecting the mall's tenancy at the time was the expiration of leases on many tenants, and a restructuring of the mall's financial structure which resulted in an increase on leasing costs by tenants. Another store, Colonial Plaza Cards, had its roof cave in due to a leak in late 1982 prior to the renovation, but reopened elsewhere in the mall as a Hallmark Cards franchise. Once renovations were complete, many new mall stores opened including Gap, Miracle-Ear, and Fanny Farmer. The owner of the Gap store in the mall noted that sales at his store were slow since it was in the Belk wing, thus putting it further away from main shopper traffic in the Ivey's and Jordan Marsh end of the mall.

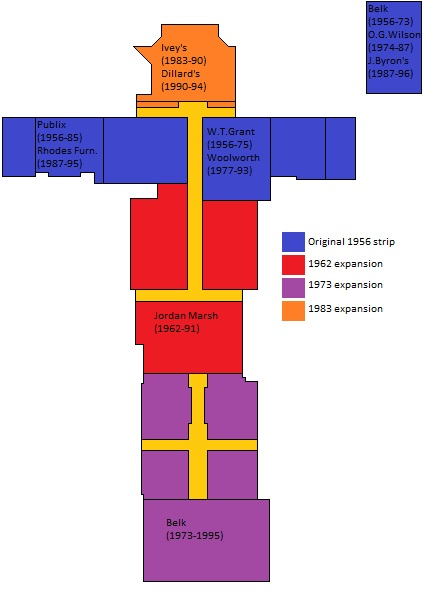
A map of Colonial Plaza in the 1980s, highlighting the expansions received over the years.

By 1985, the Publix store in the mall had closed. Although Dayton-Hudson Corporation (now Target Corporation) had announced plans to open a branch of its R. G. Branden's housewares chain in the building, it was instead sold to Rhodes Furniture, which opened in 1987. Also in 1987, the O. G. Wilson store closed and was converted to J. Byrons, a Miami-based housewares and clothing store. This opening marked the chain's return to the Orlando market, as its previous stores were sold to Ross Dress for Less in 1985 due to poor sales.

=== 1990–1995: Decline and closure ===
Dillard's acquired and rebranded the entire Ivey's chain in mid-1990. Federated Stores (now Macy's, Inc.) announced soon afterward that it would close all of the Jordan Marsh department stores in Florida by 1991. The closure of this anchor drew concern over the mall's design, particularly since Jordan Marsh separated the 1962-era mall from the South Mall. Other issues with the mall's design were brought up by many of its tenants at the time, including its "hybrid" design from being a traditional strip mall that was expanded; the distance between the Ivey's and Belk stores; and the lack of restaurants or a food court, due to original tenant Ronnie's Restaurant holding veto power over other food vendors in the mall. Representatives of J. J. Gumberg began proposing replacements for the Jordan Marsh store, and underwent negotiations with representatives of JCPenney, Parisian, Gayfers, and Montgomery Ward. Gumberg also proposed moving Dillard's into the Jordan Marsh building, or replacing the building with several smaller stores in order to promote better traffic flow to the South Mall and Belk. A representative of Federated noted that the store was not purchased by any of the other chains that took most of the other Jordan Marsh locations in Florida due to its large size and proximity to the company's Burdines store across the street at Orlando Fashion Square. In order to maintain customer traffic to the South Mall, the mall's owners erected more signs directing customers to it, while also offering golf cart service between the older property and it. After Jordan Marsh was closed, the building was used to make a "tunnel" connecting to the South Mall, lined with artwork. Woolworth announced the closure of its store at Colonial Plaza in October 1993. Zales Jewelers and Fran's Fashions also closed in 1992, creating further vacancies at the mall. In 1994, Cousins/Newmarket, a company out of Atlanta, Georgia, announced plans to buy the mall and redevelop it into a power center. At the time of their acquisition, the mall was nearly 50 percent vacant, and retail analysts had noted that its decline was due to its age, its unconventional layout, and its proximity to Orlando Fashion Square and other newer malls. Following this announcement, both Dillard's and Belk closed between late 1994 and early 1995.

=== 1995–present: Redevelopment into a power center ===
After acquiring the property in early 1995, Cousins/Newmarket announced that redevelopment plans would call for demolition of nearly the entire property in favor of a power center. The stores which were not demolished were Walgreens, J. Byron's (which closed in early 1996 during redevelopment), the former Belk, and Rhodes Furniture. As part of the redevelopment, the former Belk was divided between Marshalls and a new location of Rhodes Furniture, while the latter's old store became Barnes & Noble. Tenants in the new center included Old Navy, Circuit City, Ross Dress for Less, Linens 'n Things, Baby Superstore (which merged with Babies "R" Us soon after opening), and L. Luria & Sons catalog showroom. Other major stores included Stein Mart, Men's Wearhouse, and Just for Feet. Many of these big box stores opened in stages between late 1995 and early 1996. L. Luria & Sons underwent a chainwide liquidation in mid-1997, and by 1999, their building was being rented to Staples.

Weingarten Realty acquired the property from Cousins/Newmarket in 2001. At the time of acquisition, the center was 97% leased. Under their ownership, many changes in key tenants occurred. Rhodes Furniture closed and became a flooring/tile store called Floor & Decor in 2007. Both Linens 'n Things and Circuit City closed in 2009 after those chains filed for bankruptcy. Taking their respective places at Colonial Plaza were Big Lots and the first Hobby Lobby in the Orlando area. Babies "R" Us closed in 2011, and was replaced by Bealls Outlet and Ulta Beauty two years later. Five Below opened at the center in August 2018. In late 2018, Floor & Decor moved across the street to Orlando Fashion Square, and in 2020 it became a Conn's electronics store. Following the closure of the Stein Mart chain that same year, their location in Colonial Plaza was sold to Sprouts Farmers Market. As of 2018, Colonial Plaza is the eighth-largest shopping center in the Orlando area. The center has a trade area of over 292,000 people within a 5-mile radius, and average daily traffic counts of 72,500 cars along Colonial Drive and Bumby Avenue.
