= HighBeam Research =

Former online archive

- Logo used in February 2004
- Owner: Gale (Cengage)
- Website: highbeam.com
- Launched: August 2002; 24 years ago
- Current status: Defunct
- Content license: Copyright; All rights reserved

HighBeam Research was a paid search engine and full text online archive owned by Gale, a subsidiary of Cengage, for thousands of newspapers, magazines, academic journals, newswires, trade magazines, and encyclopedias in English. It was headquartered in Chicago, Illinois. In late 2018, the archive was shut down.

== History ==
The company was established in August 2002 after Patrick Spain, who had just sold Hoover's, which he had co-founded, bought eLibrary and Encyclopedia.com from Tucows. The new company was called Alacritude, LLC (a combination of Alacrity and Attitude). ELibrary had a library of 1,200 newspaper, magazine and radio/TV transcript archives that were generally not freely available. Original investors included Prism Opportunity Fund of Chicago and 1 to 1 Ventures of Stamford, Connecticut. Spain stated, "There was a glaring gap between free search like Google and high-end offerings like LexisNexis and Factiva."

Later in 2002, it bought Researchville.com. By 2003, it had increased its archive base to articles from 2,600 publishers. In 2004, it was renamed HighBeam Research. In 2005, it increased its publisher base to 3,500 publishers. In 2006, Oxford University Press, Knight Ridder and The Washington Post archives were added. In 2008, it was purchased by Gale, a subsidiary of Cengage. Highbeam featured many articles by the UK based Trinity Mirror Group.

Highbeam Research shut down in late 2018 after 16 years. When they did so, all of their content was added to Questia. Questia itself was permanently shut down on December 21, 2020. The vast majority of that content is still accessible through Gale's institutional databases (such as Gale Academic OneFile or Gale Primary Sources).
