= Mercantile agent =

Mercantile agent may refer to:

- a commercial agent or factor
- someone connected with a mercantile agency.
