= Veckans Affärer =

Defunct business magazine in Sweden (1965–2019)

- Categories: Business magazine
- Frequency: Weekly
- Circulation: 13,800 (2014)
- Publisher: Bonnier Tidskrifter AB
- Founded: 1965
- Final issue: December 2019
- Company: Bonnier
- Country: Sweden
- Based in: Stockholm
- Language: Swedish
- Website: Veckans Affärer

Veckans Affärer (Swedish: [ˈvɛ̂kːans aˈfæ̌ːrɛr], lit. "the week's business") was a weekly Swedish business magazine published in Stockholm, covering business-related matters both within and outside Sweden. It was in circulation between 1965 and 2019.

== History and profile ==
Veckans Affärer was first published in 1965. The magazine was modeled on Business Week and was started by Erik Westerberg. The founding editor-in-chief was Gustaf von Platen.

The magazine was published by Bonnier Business Press. It had its headquarters in Stockholm, and one of its editor-in-chief was Ulf Skarin.

In September 2019, Bonnier announced the closure of Veckans Affärer, and its final issue printed in December that year. Several of its initiatives would move over to the Dagens industri newspaper.

== Circulation ==
Following its establishment in 1965 Veckans Affärer had a circulation of 25,000 copies. In the mid-1980s the magazine sold 44,000 copies. In 2004 the circulation of the magazine was 32,700 copies. The magazine sold 33,700 copies in 2008.

In 2013 the magazine sold 16,500 copies. In 2014, the magazine had a circulation of 13,800 copies.

== Awards ==
Veckans Affärer had several yearly awards, including Superföretagen together with Bisnode since 2005. "Superföretag" was awarded to companies that over four years met high demands for growth, profitability and return on invested capital.
