= Trusted Shops =

Company founded in Cologne, Germany, in 1999

Trusted Shops AG
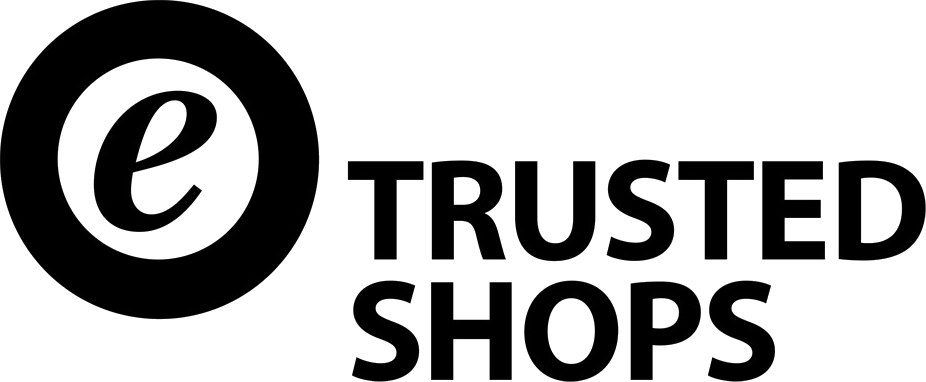
- Logo of Trusted Shops
- Trade name: Trusted Shops
- Company type: AG
- Founded: 1999
- Headquarters: Cologne, Germany
- Number of locations: 6 (2019)
- Area served: Europe
- Key people: Jean-Marc Noël, Michael Burdack
- Number of employees: 900 (February 2023)
- Website: www.trstd.com

Trusted Shops is a company founded in Cologne, Germany, in 1999, which offers online shops and their customers trust-building services by means of a trustmark, a money-back guarantee process and a system of customer reviews. Online retailers are also provided with assistance in meeting legal requirements. Around 25,000 online shops display the trustmark as of July 2019.

== Company history ==
=== Foundation ===
The company was founded in Cologne (Germany) in 1999 as a joint venture between Gerling Speziale Kreditversicherungs AG and the business consultancy Impact Business & Technology Consulting GmbH. Jean-Marc Noël and Ulrich Hafenbradl were among the founders. The company began operations one year later. Its offer consisted of a trustmark for online shops, and from the very beginning the company also offered customers of online shops displaying the trustmark a money-back guarantee. By mid-November 2000, around 100 shops had obtained the trustmark.

=== Development ===
Number of shops with the trustmark
Nov. 2000	around 100
Oct. 2001	around 200
Nov. 2006	1.600
Jan. 2008	more than 2.570
Nov. 2008	around 3.000
Nov. 2009	6.000
Nov. 2010	more than 9.000
May 2013	more than 10.000
Nov. 2015	more than 20.000
May 2017	more than 25.000

The number of online shops with a trustmark grew in the following years. While there were 9,000 in 2010, more than 30,000 trusted shops are currently registered (last update October 2021).

In 2009, the company offered interested shops its web-based shopping review tool as a stand-alone version that is independent of the trustmark.

Trusted Shops France SARL was founded in 2017 as a wholly owned subsidiary of Trusted Shops GmbH, and one year later the Polish subsidiary was founded. The Spanish subsidiary was founded in September 2019 and the Dutch subsidiary in October 2019.

== Present ==
=== Services ===
- Online shops are entitled to use the Trusted Shops trustmark after passing an audit that includes aspects such as data security, consumer protection, customer service, price transparency and creditworthiness.
- The money-back guarantee adds financial security to the promise that online shops with trustmark are trustworthy providers.
- Companies can use web-based feedback systems to have their customers review purchases or transactions. This includes, for example, the service, the website, or the delivered product quality. The system ensures that only customers who have made purchases participate in the feedback procedure.
- The legal security aid is offered in cooperation with law firms and includes, among other things, the drafting of legal texts (such as the General Terms and Conditions), checking websites for compliance with e-commerce law, and representation in case of legal disputes in Germany and other European countries.

=== Personnel and locations ===
The company’s headquarters is located in Cologne (Germany). Further locations are in France (Lille), in the Netherlands (Amsterdam), in Poland (Warsaw) and in Spain (Barcelona). According to its own statements, the company employs 500 people.

=== Owners ===
According to the information based on the financial year 2017 provided by Bisnode, two Crédit Agricole funds (CA Innovation 10 and LCL Innovation 2009) jointly own 10% of the shares in Trusted Shops. Two private equity and infrastructure funds owned by French investor Omnes Capital (Capital Invest PME 2014 and Capital Invest PME 2015) jointly hold 4%. Sohano GmbH owns 23% and Entract GmbH owns 38%. 25% is held by Global Founders Capital GmbH & Co (belongs to Rocket Internet).
