= Alabama Theatre (Houston) =

Historic movie theater in Texas, USA

Coordinates: 29.7393°N 95.4112°W

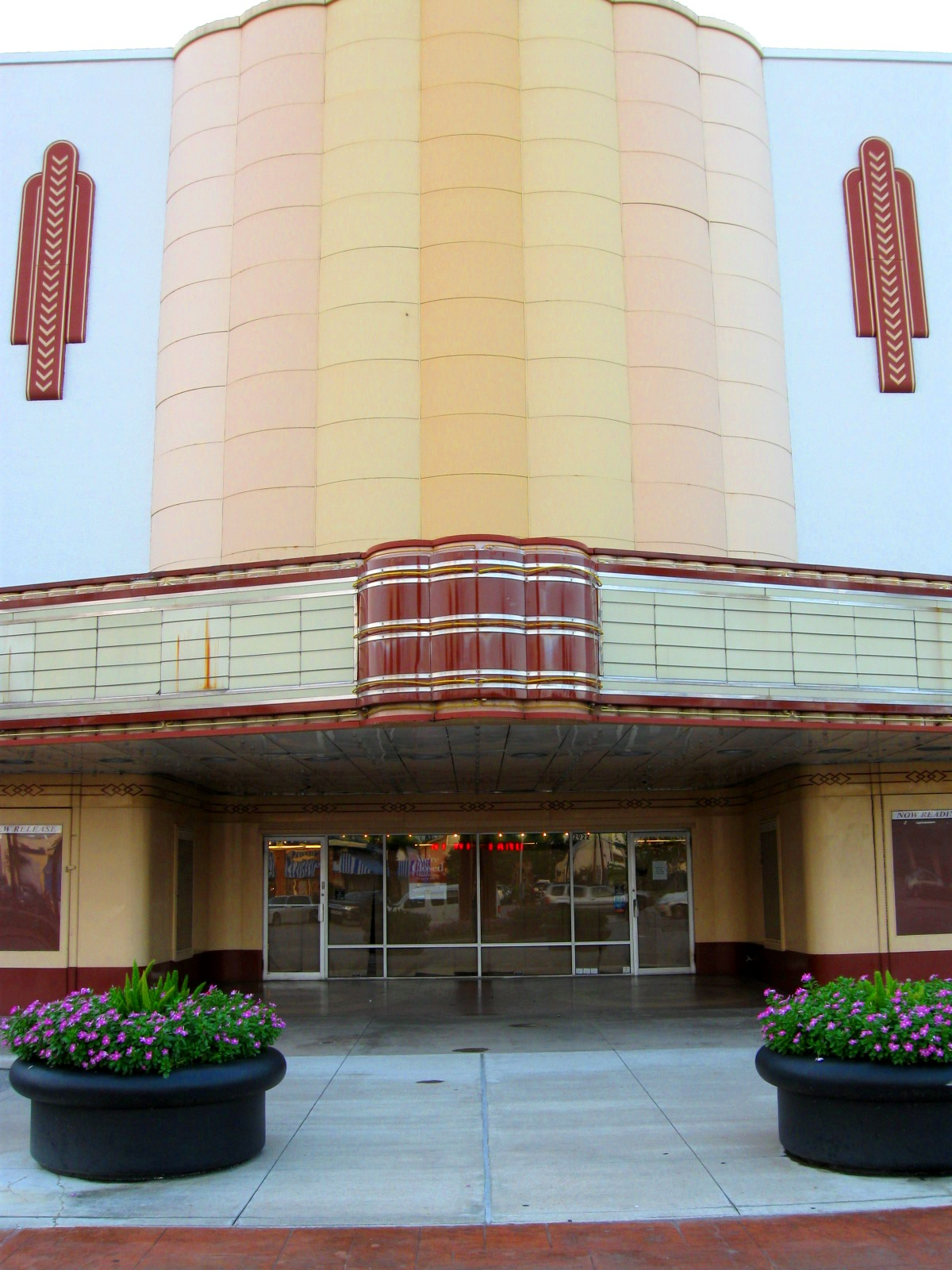
- Interactive map of Alabama Theatre
- Address: 2922 South Shepherd; Houston, Texas; United States
- Owner: Weingarten Realty
- Type: Art Deco-Streamline Moderne Theatre
- Designation: City of Houston Landmark
- Current use: Grocer
- Production: Trader Joe's

Construction
- Opened: 1939
- Rebuilt: 1983
- Years active: 1939–
- Architect: W. Scott Dunne

Website
- http://traderjoes.com

The Alabama Theatre is a historic movie theater located at the intersection of Alabama Street and Shepherd Drive in the Upper Kirby district of Houston, Texas. Constructed in 1939, in the Art Deco and Streamline Moderne styles as a suburban theater, the Alabama primarily booked roadshow engagements through most of its history. Today, the theater is home to a Trader Joe's grocery store. It is one of the buildings of the Alabama Shepherd Shopping Center, owned by Weingarten Realty.

== History ==
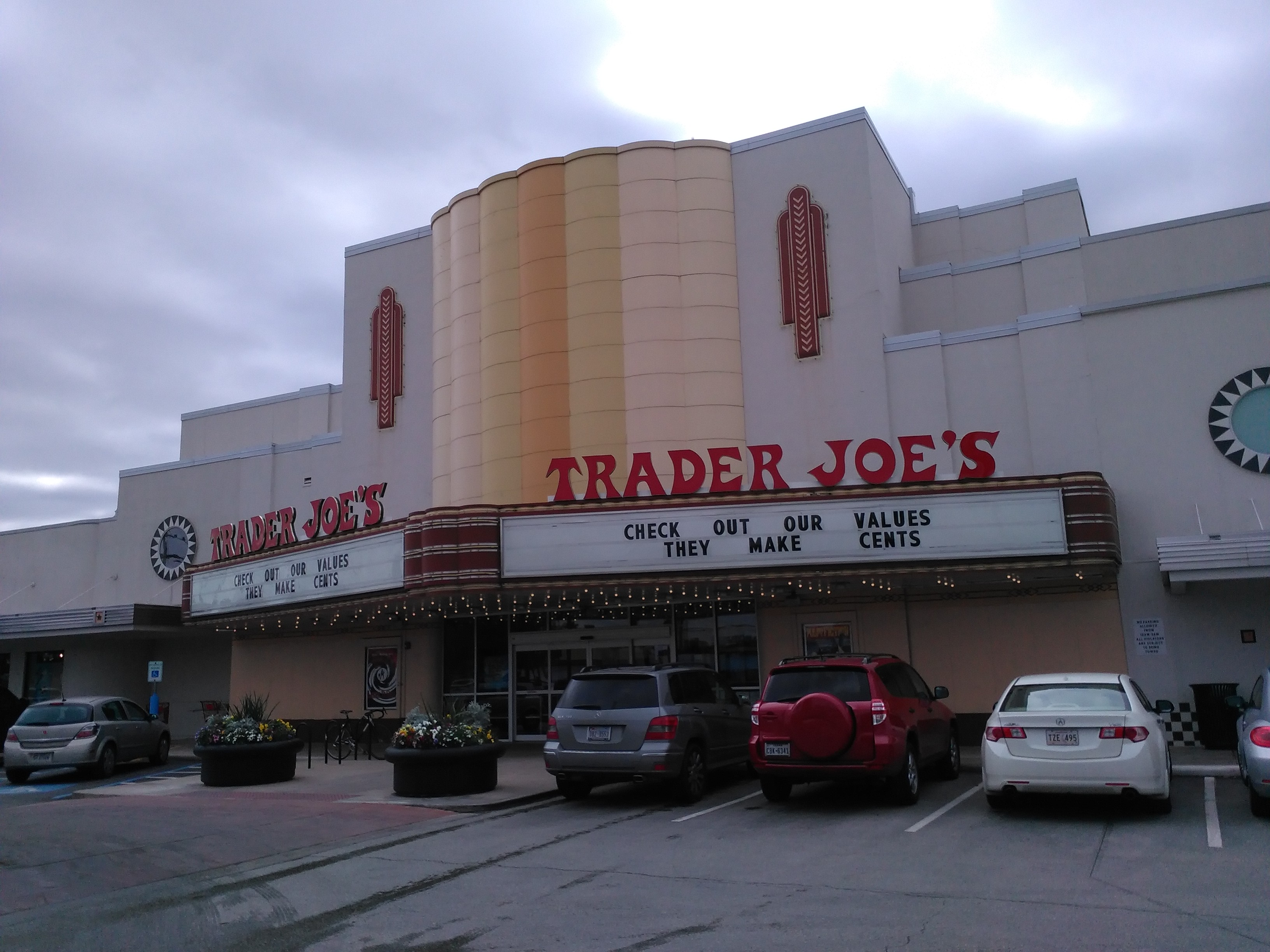
The Alabama Theatre as a Trader Joe's

=== Beginnings as Alabama Theatre ===
As Houston and the rest of the country recovered from the Great Depression, art-deco style theaters of the late 1930s were built in many residential neighborhoods across the city. The 739-seat Alabama Theatre opened on November 2, 1939, screening Man About Town, starring Jack Benny. The Alabama was Interstate Theater Corporation's tenth theater in the Houston area. The showing of the first CinemaScope film made (The Robe) at the first CinemaScope screening in Houston took place at the Alabama Theater.

=== Renovation to Alabama Bookstop ===
Competition from multicinemas, television, and videotape reduced Alabama’s attendance and profits. The theater was closed as a movie theater and was renovated as a retail bookstore, preserving many details such as its murals and balconies while undergoing an exterior and interior renovation designed to preserve the Streamline Moderne architecture of the 1930s. The theater was reopened as the Alabama Bookstop bookstore in 1984 (later acquired by Barnes & Noble booksellers) and became the retailer's most profitable location. Gary Hoover, one founder of Bookstop, stated that his architects set up the building so it could be easily converted back into the theater in case the bookstore closed. Laura Nathan-Garner, the author of Insiders' Guide to Houston, wrote that despite the fact that the Bookstop was owned by a chain, the fact it was located in a former theater "has enabled it to retain an independent flair."

=== Weingarten Purchase, Concerns over Historic Preservation, and Conversion to Trader Joe's ===
Weingarten Realty purchased the Alabama Shepherd Shopping Center in 2004. The Alabama Bookstop closed in September, 2009 after 25 years as a bookstore. Weingarten Realty Investors, owner of the theater was interested in saving the historic building as long as the proposals make economic sense for the company. Weingarten considered razing the building and building high-rise development on the site. The Greater Houston Preservation Alliance recently placed the Alabama Theater on its endangered buildings list due to the threat of demolition. Additionally, Preservation Texas also listed the theater as one of the state's most endangered places as well as being designated as a historic property by the City of Houston.

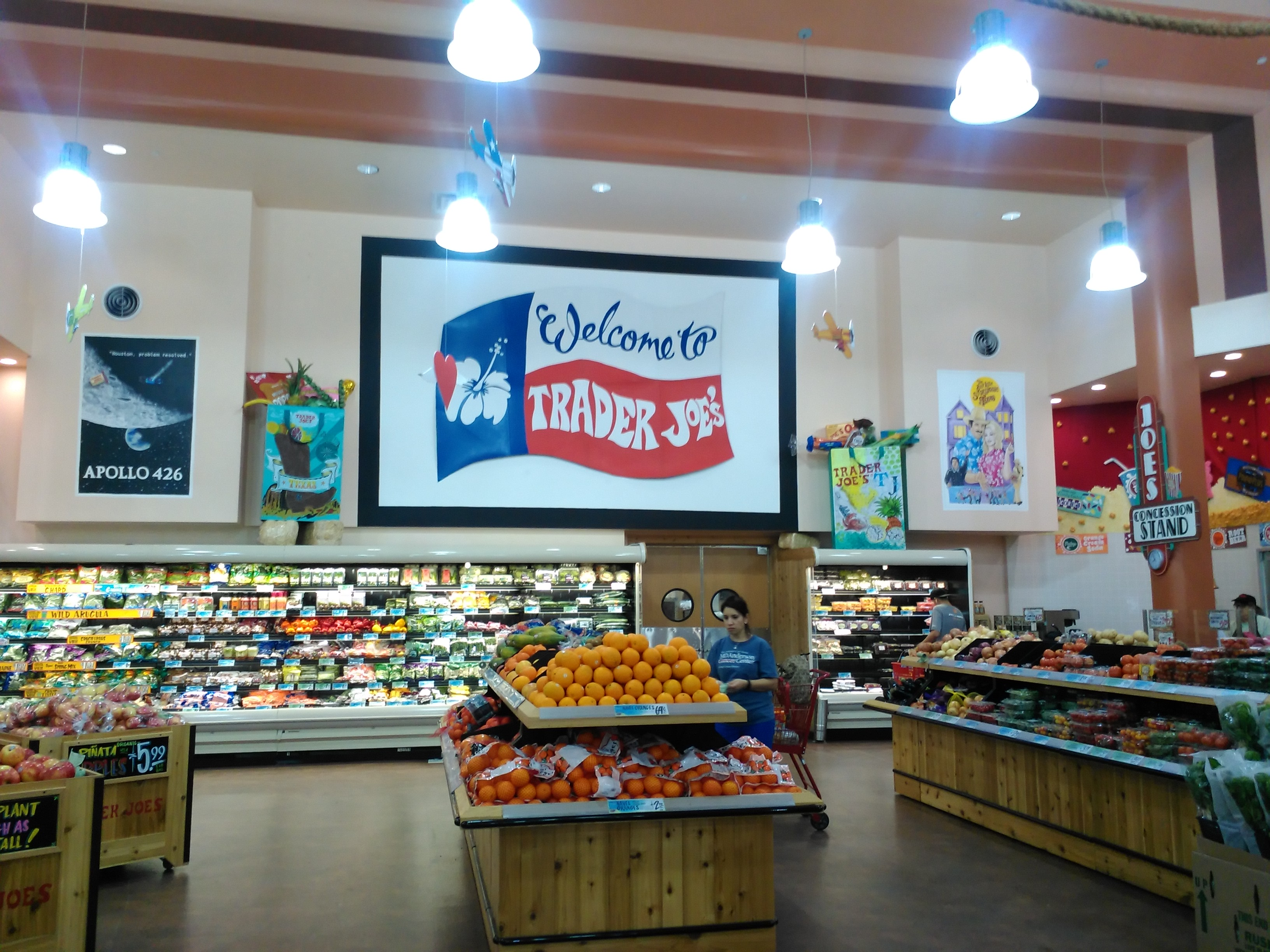
Interior of the Trader Joe's

“We’re here to preserve yet another endangered species,” said Carolyn Farb at a Houston city council meeting, “Let’s not wipe away history with a big eraser.”

In 2010 according to some construction documents Weingarten planned to bury the theater's sloped floor under a concrete slab and to remove the wooden floors that had been inserted in the 1983 conversion to a bookstore. Weingarten for now plans to keep the balcony. In March 2010 Alamo Drafthouse renewed its talks with Weingarten in regards to a proposal to lease space in the Alabama Theatre.

In September 2011 Trader Joe's stated that it was considering opening its first Greater Houston location in the Alabama Theatre. The Texas Historical Commission has informed the Greater Houston Preservation Alliance that Trader Joe's renovation plans for the Alabama Theater would leave the historic terrazzo at the theater’s original entrance intact. In September 2011 the City of Houston's Houston Archaeological and Historical Commission approved the proposed exterior changes that the property would make to the Alabama Theatre. If the municipal commission voted against the changes, the property owner would have been able to make them anyway after waiting 90 days. Throughout the processes of restoration and conversion to grocery store, Trader Joe’s made efforts to preserve and pay homage to the building’s history, such as putting 1000 hours of work into refurbishing the ceiling (featuring a large medallion), rewiring the theater marquee, preserving the balcony and entrance mosaic tile floors (as stated in the renovation plans), creating thematic movie posters (e.g., "Gentlemen Prefer Blonde Ales," "Reservoir Hot Dogs," "Pulpy Fiction”), and displaying a genuine poster of the first movie to screen at the theatre in 1939.

Because of the Trader Joe's lease, the shopping center's occupancy rate became 100%. Due to the restoration, the Alabama Shepherd Shopping Center won the 2013 Landmark Award in Historic Preservation from the Houston Business Journal.

== See also ==
- Historic preservation
- Architecture of Houston
