= Alabama Theatre (disambiguation) =

Alabama Theatre may refer to:

- Alabama Theatre, the oldest and listed on the National Register of Historic Places in Birmingham, Alabama
- Alabama Theatre (Houston), located in Houston, Texas
- Alabama Theatre (North Myrtle Beach), located in North Myrtle Beach, South Carolina
