= Gary Hoover =

American businessperson (born 1951)

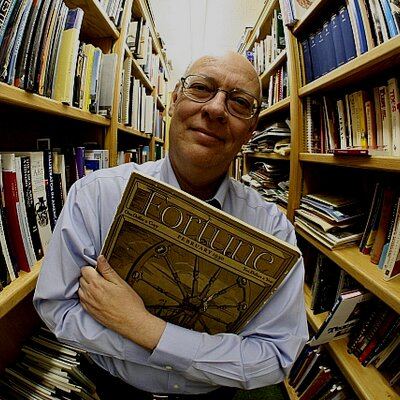
- Gary Hoover at a library, holding a book, circa 2020s.
- Born: March 19, 1951 (age 75); Lafayette, Indiana, United States
- Citizenship: American
- Education: University of Chicago
- Occupations: Writer, author, entrepreneur, public speaker

Gary Hoover (born March 19, 1951) is an American businessperson who founded Bookstop, an American bookstore chain, and The Reference Press, which became Hoover's business information company. He is the entrepreneur-in-residence at the University of Texas at Austin School of Information.

== Early life ==
Hoover was born in Lafayette, Indiana, the third of the three children of grocer and later Indiana Glass Company executive Wilbur C. and substitute school teacher Judith. He grew up in Anderson, Indiana, a General Motors factory town, graduating from Madison Heights High School in 1969.

As a child, Hoover displayed an interest in business. He invented business games to play with friends. At the age of 12 in a quest to better understand General Motors he discovered and subscribed to Fortune Magazine.

In 1969, Hoover entered the University of Chicago. There, he earned a bachelor's degree in economics.

== Business career ==
After graduating from college, Hoover spent two years as a security analyst at Citibank, New York, covering the retailing industry, followed by two years as a buyer for Sanger-Harris, the Dallas division of Federated Department Stores. In 1977 he joined the May Department Stores Company in St. Louis, where he spent five years in tasks ranging from financial analysis and planning to shopping center development and marketing.

=== Bookstop ===
In 1982, Hoover moved to Austin, Texas, where he launched Bookstop, a book superstore. Over seven years he and his colleagues developed the first chain of book superstores. In 1989 Bookstop was the United States's fourth-largest bookstore chain, with a total of 22 stores in four U.S. states. Laura Elder of the Houston Business Journal wrote that the chain "pioneered the superstore concept". Hoover himself states that "While the execution of the idea was difficult and complex, the core idea was not. We simply took the retail business model of Toys R Us — giant single-category stores with large product selections and low prices — and applied it to books." Bookstop sold to Barnes & Noble for $41.5 million in 1989.

=== Hoover's ===
In 1990, Hoover, Patrick Spain, and the same friends who helped start Bookstop started The Reference Press to publish Hoover's Handbook, an annual guide to big companies and other enterprises. The Reference Press would become Hoover's under the leadership of Hoover's friend Patrick Spain. Hoover stepped down as chief executive officer in December 1992 to return to retailing, but remained on as chairman of the board of directors. In 1999 Hoover's, Inc. began trading on the NASDAQ until it was purchased in 2003 by Dun & Bradstreet for $117 million.

=== TravelFest Superstores ===
In 1994, using capital he had raised in a private placement and from small investors in Texas, Hoover opened two TravelFest stores in Austin and one in Houston. The superstore concept lost a major source of revenue when major airlines cut back the commissions they paid to travel agents. The stores were subsequently closed.

=== RoadStoryUSA ===
In 2005 Hoover founded StoryStores, to build a chain of for-profit museums. The first, RoadStoryUSA, was planned to be a museum and entertainment center dedicated to the American road and all things connected with it. During the 2008 recession the project was aborted.

=== Bigwig Games ===
In 2012 he started Bigwig Games, to produce business and social science strategic simulation games for the iPad and other tablet devices. Hoover is the CEO and chief game designer of Bigwig Games. In August 2014 the company launched its first game, Restaurant Bigwig, for the iPad.

=== American Business History Center ===
In 2019 Hoover started the American Business History Center, a 501(c)3 non-profit corporation, devoted to the study, popularization, and celebration of business and entrepreneurial history. The center's purpose is to create and sponsor outreach programs including social media, speeches, video and audio presentations, tours, and books and other printed and digital articles and publications.

=== Board Memberships ===
From 1988 to 1993 Hoover served on the Board of Directors of Whole Foods Market.

Hoover is the executive director and a board member of the American Business History Center. Hoover is a fellow of the IC2 Institute and serves on the University of Texas School of Information Advisory Council, the XADS Advisory Board, and the advisory board of the Archbridge Institute. Hoover is a former member of the University of Chicago Alumni Board of Governors.

== Personal life ==
Hoover lives in Flatonia, Texas, where he has a library of more than 57,000 books.

=== Recognition ===
In 2008, Hoover received a distinguished alumni award from the University of Chicago. In 2011, he was named one of the 30 most influential people in Austin, Texas by the Austin Business Journal. In 2013, he was inducted into the Anderson Indiana Schools Hall of Fame.

=== Entrepreneurship ===
In 2009, Hoover became the first entrepreneur-in-residence at the McCombs School of Business at the University of Texas at Austin. In 2012, he became the entrepreneur-in-residence at the University of Texas at Austin School of Information. He teaches classes through his independent Hoover Academy, and speaks worldwide. Hoover has mentored hundreds of young entrepreneurs.

=== Philanthropy ===
In 2001, the University of Chicago opened the Hoover House dormitory, named in honor of Hoover for the gifts of stock in his companies made to the university over the last 20 years.

=== Writings ===
In 2001, Hoover's book Hoover’s Vision: Original Thinking for Business Success was published by Texere, New York. An updated version of the book re-titled The Art of Enterprise is available on dpdcart in pdf form.

In 2016, Hoover published Gary Hoover's Retail Handbook 2016: Principles, Trends, and Giants of Retailing - a book of the history of retail innovations, mindsets of merchants, and business models of retailing.

In July 2017, Hoover's book The Lifetime Learner's Guide to Reading and Learning was published by Assiduity Publishing House, Philadelphia.

Hoover maintains a blog, Hooversworld, and a YouTube channel - hooverbits.
