= Bijoy Goswami =

Bijoy Goswami is the Founder of the Bootstrap Network and the author of The Human Fabric.

== Social models for business ==
Bijoy Goswami is an entrepreneurial philosopher and promoter known for his ideas on bootstrap entrepreneurship and social modeling in the context of the development of successful organizations. He is known for developing mental models to help businesses work and grow more efficiently.

Bijoy’s models organize complex ideas into paradigms that people and organizations can understand, process and implement into successful projects and project teams. He has published books (The Human Fabric), music, plays and film (Mystic Cab), communities and web sites.

Bijoy’s latest works involve multiple social/entrepreneurial models including MRE, youPlusU and Bootstrap.

== Early years ==
Bijoy Goswami has grown up at the intersection of eastern and western philosophies: he was born in Bangalore, India, moved to Taiwan at age 10, to Hong Kong at 14, and came to the U.S. in 1991 to attend Stanford University, where he studied computer science, economics and history, and completed an honors program in science, technology and society. He also spent a term at Oxford University.

== Book ==
- The Human Fabric: Unleashing the Power of Core Energy in Everyone, Aviri Publishing (2004) ISBN 0-9760574-0-9

== Sources ==
- in Information Week
- in Entrepreneur
- in US News
- in the Austin Business Journal
- in Business Week
- in Entrepreneur
- in Kiplinger
