= Rudolf Wall =

Swedish publisher and journalist

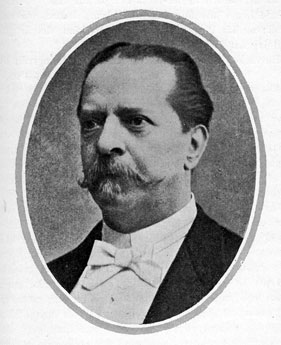
Axel Rudolf Mauritz Wall

Axel Rudolf Mauritz Wall (19 January 1826 – 20 August 1893) was a Swedish publisher and journalist who founded Dagens Nyheter in 1864.

== Biography ==
Wall was born at Sevalla in Västmanland County, Sweden. He was the son of the merchant sailor Erik Gustaf Saxholm and Johanna Fredrika Chagelin. He grew up under modest circumstances, mainly with his mother. After receiving private tuition, he got into contact with Lars Johan Hierta (1801–1872), the founder of Aftonbladet, in whose office he began to work as a boy, continuing his education in the meantime. He advanced in Hierta's employ and was eventually given editorial work. In 1846, he took over a printshop which he had previously rented for two years, and which now became known as the Wall printshop (Wallska tryckeriet). The company succeeded under his leadership and in 1847, he started the Sunday news Söndagstidningen and the next year a weekly magazine for children and youth Veckoskrift för barn och ungdom. As a consequence, he was recognized as a burgess of the city in 1858.

Some failed dealings caused a bankruptcy in 1859 and forced him to embark on a journalistic career to support himself. He began at Göteborgs Handels- och Sjöfartstidning, and later returned to Aftonbladet. He also started the book series Sveriges handelskalender and translated political writings. When Wall established Dagens Nyheter in 1864, there was no other morning paper in Sweden. He remained editor-in-chief until 1889. The company was reorganized to become a public limited corporation in 1874, Dagens Nyheter AB. Wall became its first chairman and remained so until his death in 1893.

== Personal life ==
In 1852, he married Rosalia Löwenström (1830-1897). Rudolf Wall died 1893 and was buried at Norra begravningsplatsen in Stockholm.

== See also ==
- Sveriges Handelskalendar

== Other sources ==
- Hasselberg, Gudmar, Rudolf Wall. Dagens Nyheters skapare (1944)
