= Bob Carrigan =

American business executive (born 1966)

Robert Carrigan
- Born: January 28, 1966 (age 60)
- Occupation: Business executive

Robert Carrigan (born January 28, 1966) is the CEO of Audible, Inc., having assumed the role on January 2, 2020. Previously, he was chairman and chief executive officer of Dun & Bradstreet between 2013 and 2018, and a senior executive at IDG Communications Inc. from 2003 to 2013.

== Early life and education ==
Carrigan graduated from Boston University with a bachelor's degree in Business Administration. He was raised in Philadelphia, PA.

== Career ==
He has served as CEO of Audible since January 2020. He was previously chairman and CEO of Dun & Bradstreet, and CEO of IDG Communications Inc. He was also the senior vice president of the Interactive Media Group at AOL, Inc.

== Boards and honors ==
Carrigan stepped down as chairman of the board of Dun & Bradstreet on February 12, 2018. He held a seat on the board of IDG from 2013 through 2017, until the company was sold to China Oceanwide. He served on the board of the Interactive Advertising Bureau (IAB) for seven years, and was chairman in 2011. In 2016, Carrigan was named NJ Master Entrepreneur of the Year by Ernst & Young. In January 2017, Carrigan was appointed by President Obama to serve on the National Security Telecommunications Advisory Committee (NSTAC).

== Personal life ==
Carrigan is married with three children. In his free time, he plays the banjo.
