= The Portable Bloomberg: The Wit and Wisdom of Michael Bloomberg =

1990 book

- Author: Elisabeth DeMarse
- Illustrator: Joe Pep
- Language: English
- Subject: Personal sayings and business advice
- Publisher: White Mountain Press
- Publication date: February 14, 1990
- Publication place: United States
- Media type: Print (softcover)
- Pages: 32

The Portable Bloomberg: The Wit and Wisdom of Michael Bloomberg is a 1990 booklet that contains sayings, maxims, comments, and other thoughts of Michael Bloomberg. The 32-page publication compiles quotes attributed to Bloomberg, while he was leading Bloomberg L.P., and prepared by the company's chief marketing officer, Elisabeth DeMarse. The book, which calls itself an "unauthorized collection of unauthorized sayings", was a gift to Bloomberg on his 48th birthday and contains a total of 121 quotes.

== Accuracy ==
In the introduction, DeMarse says that the book contains actual quotes from Bloomberg and insists on their accuracy. "No, nothing has been embellished or exaggerated." While the book contains profanity and misogynistic sayings, DeMarse clarifies in the introduction that "some things were too outrageous to include.” When asked about the book in 2001, DeMarse told New York Magazine that "He says this stuff to customers and new hires and anyone who comes into the office."

== Contents ==
The book is divided into sections like “On Computers” or “On Customer Service”. The sayings are interspersed with cartoons. “Make the customer think he’s getting laid when he’s getting fucked,” is the booklet's first Bloomberg quotation.

=== Ambitions ===
The book begins with Bloomberg's musing on his life goals. On page six, he asks rhetorically "What do I want?" and replies "I want an exclusive, 10-year contract, an automatic extension, and I want you to pay me. And I want [oral sex] from Jane Fonda. Have you seen Jane Fonda? Not bad for fifty."

He also comments that "Everyone I know who is successful loves what they do. The question is: are they successful because they love what they do, or do they love what they do because they are successful? I don’t know. I suspect it’s a combination of both."

=== Women ===
The book contains many comments about women and their role in society: "If women wanted to be appreciated for their brains, they’d go to the library instead of to Bloomingdales." He also says "I know for a fact that any self-respecting woman who walks past a construction site doesn’t get a whistle will turn around and walk past again and again until she does get one." Joking about divorce, he said "Whenever my wife catches me eyeing some broad, she’s very careful to turn to me and say “That’s the most expensive piece of ass in the world!” Joking about homosexuality, he said "On being asked to name a sport that doesn’t use balls: 'Lesbian Sex.'"

=== New York City ===
The publication has multiple comments on New York City, highlighting the metropolis' unique qualities and challenges. Praising his home borough, he said "We live in Manhattan so we don't have to go anyplace else". While criticizing Queens, he said "I make it a rule never to go to Queens and since that eliminated both airports, I don't travel a great deal." On New York cuisine, he said "You know, there’s a Federal Law that prohibits the serving of good food west of 12th Avenue — look it up".

=== Business ===
Bloomberg praised his eponymous terminals, saying that they “[can] do everything, include give you a blowjob. I guess that puts a lot of you girls out of business,” He said "The three biggest lies are: the check’s in the mail, I’ll respect you in the morning, and I’m glad I’m Jewish." Comparing persistent salesmanship to sexual insistence, Bloomberg said "“A good salesperson asks for the order, It’s like the guy who goes into a bar, and walks up to every gorgeous girl there, and says ‘Do you want to fuck?’ He gets turned down a lot – but he gets fucked a lot, too!” Bloomberg says a competitor is a “cokehead, womanizing, fag.”

Bloomberg also has more well-accepted, common aphorisms, including “Don’t get even – get revenge.” and “By definition, 50% of the people don’t want a level playing field.” He also suggests to "Always pick a fight with someone smaller than you”.

=== Lifestyle ===
Making a joke about his use of language, Bloomberg said "When the Wall Street Journal article came out saying I was profane, my dear old mother called me to ask me if it was true. ‘Ma,’ I said, ‘Fuck ‘em!’"

=== Public figures ===
Bloomberg comments on other celebrities. He says "The Royal Family — what a bunch of misfits — a gay, an architect, that horsey faced lesbian, and a kid who gave up Koo Stark for some fat broad."

== Response ==
Bloomberg has provided differing and at times contradictory responses to the book. DeMarse, who compiled the quotes, said that Bloomberg was pleased with the publication when he received it, and commented that "He was touched. He loves things that are about himself." In 2001, Bloomberg apologized to "anyone that was offended by" the contents of the book. He said he could not remember saying them and also sought to excuse the book as "a bunch of Borscht Belt jokes". In 2020, after the book was put online by the Washington Post, Bloomberg's campaign spokesperson denied the accuracy of the book. Bloomberg's spokesperson also said that some of what he said was "disrespectful and wrong" and that "his words have not always aligned with his values and his life."

The publication received greater scrutiny as Bloomberg's presidential campaign gained popularity. During the February 19, 2020 Democratic debate, he was asked about comments included in the publication.
