= Archbridge Institute =

American nonprofit organization

The Archbridge Institute is a 501(c)(3) nonprofit organization focused on social mobility and human flourishing. A nonpartisan organization based in the United States, Archbridge advocates for personal responsibility, rule of law, and entrepreneurship. It was founded by Gonzalo Schwarz.

Archbridge publishes research on occupational licensing, child care regulations, and other economic measures. The organization also studies the American Dream, and is a member of the Milken Institute's Economic Mobility Alliance.

== History ==
Archbridge was founded in 2016 by Schwarz, who wanted to build a "human flourishing movement."

In 2023, Archbridge published the State Occupational Licensing Index, ranking all 50 states and the District of Columbia based on their occupational licensing burden. Arkansas topped the list with the most occupational licensing, while Kansas had the least. Archbridge published the report again in 2024, ranking Kansas as the best state while Texas finished last. The annual study analyzes the number of tasks and tests that people seeking professional qualifications must pass before they are allowed to practice a trade in each state. It was also released in 2026.

In 2025, Archbridge released its annual "American Dream Snapshot," finding that about 70 percent of Americans are optimistic about the American Dream.

In 2026, Archbridge published the State Childcare Regulations Index, finding that child care regulations lead to higher costs and lower access to care. In the report, Idaho had the lowest regulatory burden, while Vermont had the highest.

Archbridge is a member of the Milken Institute's Economic Mobility Alliance.

== Leadership ==
Schwarz is Archbridge's president and CEO.

Clay Routledge is the organization's executive vice president and COO. An existential psychologist and nostalgia expert, Routledge is also the director of Archbridge's Human Flourishing Lab.

As of 2026, Archbridge has eight staff members and 20 fellows on its economics, psychology, and culture teams.
