= Sveriges Handelskalendar =

Swedish journal

Sveriges Handelskalendar, was a Swedish journal, business directory, which began publication in 1859. It was published by Albert Bonnier.

== See also ==
- Rudolf Wall
- Albert Bonnier
- Bisnode
