= Bookstop (company) =

- Company type: Public
- Founded: Travis County, Texas (1982)
- Founder: Gary Hoover and Steve Mathews
- Successor: Barnes & Noble
- Headquarters: Travis County, Texas
- Number of locations: (1989): 22
- Key people: Patrick Spain
- Revenue: (1989): $65 million

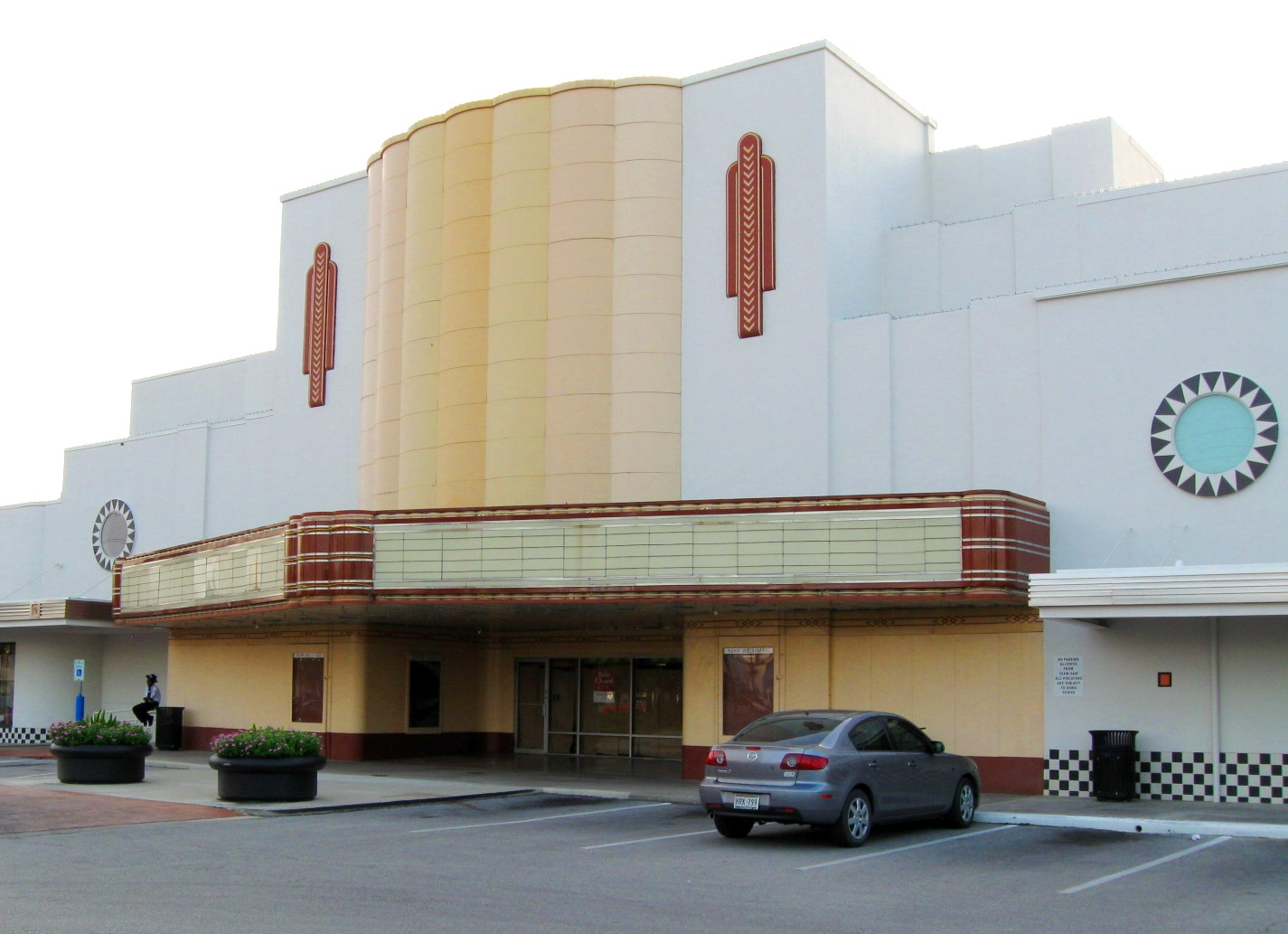
The Alabama Theatre in the Upper Kirby area of Houston is a former Bookstop location

Bookstop Inc. was a Texas-based chain of bookstores that was at one time the fourth-largest bookselling chain in the United States. In 1989 Barnes & Noble acquired the company, at which point it became a subsidiary of Barnes & Noble. The chain also did business under the name Bookstar due to trademark conflicts in other states.

== Business model ==
Laura J. Miller, author of Reluctant Capitalists: Bookselling and the Culture of Consumption, wrote that the chain "combined discounting with very wide selection, careful attention to display, and a reliance on sophisticated information systems in order to build a chain that would appeal to affluent, educated readers." Jason Epstein, author of Book Business: Publishing Past, Present, and Future, described the chain as being modeled on the supermarket concept. Miller stated that the store format was "consciously" modeled after the format of the Toys "R" Us stores. Laura Elder of the Houston Business Journal wrote that the chain "pioneered the superstore concept". Hoover himself states that "While the execution of the idea was difficult and complex, the core idea was not. We simply took the retail business model of Toys R Us — giant single-category stores with large product selections and low prices — and applied it to books."

Bookstop measured how well a title sold for 130 days after being placed on the shelves to decide whether to retain it in stores beyond that point. If the book was considered definitive in its field, it could remain even without strong sales.

== History ==
Bookstop opened in 1982, established by Gary Hoover and Steve Mathews. Patrick Spain, who had attended university with Hoover, invested some of the original capital into the chain. Its headquarters were in unincorporated Travis County, Texas, in Greater Austin (using an Austin postal address). In 1989 the chain had a total of 22 stores in Texas, California, Florida, and Louisiana, and about $65 million in annual sales. For its superstore format, Bookstop acquired many former downtown theatres to turn them into vast bookstores.

=== Barnes & Noble acquisition ===
In 1989 the board of Bookstop asked Hoover to step down from his position. That year, Hoover and a group of venture capitalists sold Bookstop to Barnes & Noble for $41.5 million. Barnes & Noble made the acquisition after a multi-month struggle with Crown Books, as both had purchased significant stakes in Bookstop with the aim of acquiring it. After Barnes & Noble completed the purchase, Crown sold its share in the company.

Solveig Robinson, author of The Book in Society: An Introduction to Print Culture, wrote that the purchase "gave [Barnes and Noble] the necessary know-how and infrastructure to create what, in 1992, became the definitive bookselling superstore." Miller wrote that Bookstop was "a key part of Barnes & Noble's early superstore efforts."

After the acquisition, Bookstop-branded stores continued to exist, and Barnes & Noble became Bookstop's parent company. In 1997, Barnes & Nobles decided to turn the NY Bookstop into a B&N branded store. This initiated the process of retiring the Bookstop brand. In August 2009, the Bookstop at the Alabama Theater in Houston that opened in 1984 was turned into a Barnes & Noble.

== See also ==
- Hoover's - Another company founded by Gary Hoover
