= Newser =

American news aggregation website

Newser, LLC
- Company type: Private
- Website type: News aggregation website
- Available in: English
- Founded: October 2007; 19 years ago
- Headquarters: Chicago, Illinois; United States
- Founder: Michael Wolff
- President: Kate Seamons
- CEO: Patrick Spain
- Key people: Mike Kline, CTO
- Industry: News Publishing
- Employees: 15
- Website: www.newser.com
- Advertising: Yes
- Registration: Optional
- Current status: Online
- Written in: ASP.NET

Newser is an American news aggregation website. It was founded in 2007 by journalist/media pundit Michael Wolff and businessman Patrick Spain, the former CEO of HighBeam Research and Hoover's.

Newser's president and editor-in-chief is Kate Seamons, formerly of the Chicago Sun-Times, who joined the site in 2007 as managing editor. She was promoted when founding editor-in-chief Caroline Miller left the organization at the end of August 2010; Seamons became president in December 2012.

== History ==
Newser launched in October 2007 at a party at New York's Waverly Inn and was lauded as "Drudge-like" and "innovative."

Newser's tagline, “Read Less, Know More” embodies the idea behind the site's creation. The website utilizes human-powered aggregation; its staff of editors and writers curate approximately 45 stories each day and present them in a two paragraph, multiple source format.

In February 2009, The New York Times threatened legal action against Newser for trademark infringement and posting a photograph without permission. Newser removed the photograph in question, calling its publication an editor's mistake.

In June 2009, Newser received $2.5 million in first-round funding, mainly from a collection of individual investors.

In April 2010, The Wrap's Sharon Waxman accused Newser of not providing sufficient links or credit to original sources.

Michael Wolff was named editorial director of AdweekMedia on October 4, 2010, a position he held for a year. Patrick Spain stepped down as CEO on October 18, 2010 but returned to the role in March 2012 following Newser CEO Elisabeth DeMarse’s move to TheStreet.

In 2011, Newser was in talks to purchase and merge with Salon.com, but the deal ultimately fell through.

Newser was hoaxed by Triumph the Insult Comic Dog during the 2016 presidential election. Newser was featured as a site that published a story about fake "Trump TV" auditions.

== Features ==
User interaction is handled by several third-party widgets including ShareThis, AddThis, and the Disqus commenting widget.

"Newser by Users" was a feature from 2010 to 2012, which allowed users to write and upload stories directly to the Newser website without editorial review.

"Off The Grid" was an occasional Newser blog by founder Michael Wolff that was written between 2008 and 2010.
