= Lili (platform) =

American financial technology company

Lili Banking
- Company type: Private
- Industry: Financial technology
- Founded: 2018
- Founders: Lilac Bar David; Liran Zelkha
- Headquarters: New York City, United States
- Key people: Lilac Bar David (CEO); Liran Zelkha (CTO)
- Products: Business checking account
- Services: Banking, business credit
- Website: lili.co

Lili is a financial technology platform based in New York. It provides online banking services to small businesses.

== History ==
Lili was founded in 2018 by Lilac Bar David and Liran Zelkha.

The platform’s user base grew significantly during the COVID-19 pandemic, reaching nearly 100,000 accounts by the end of that year. In October 2020, Lili secured a $15 million Series A round to support this growth.

In May 2021, Lili raised an additional $55 million in a Series B round, bringing its total funding to $80 million. By that time, the company had surpassed 200,000 users. Later that year, Lili introduced its paid subscription plans, offering advanced financial tools and features for business owners.

In 2022, Fast Company named Lili one of its "World's 50 Most Innovative Companies."

In 2024, TearSheet announced Lili as the best bank for SMBs. On August 13, 2024, Lili announced a partnership with Dun & Bradstreet to provide small business owners with tools and insights to start building and tracking their business credit.

In 2025, Lili announced a shift in its target audience, moving away from freelancers and repositioning its product to serve small businesses. As part of this shift, Lili increased its FDIC insurance coverage to $3 million.

== Products ==
At its core, Lili provides a business checking account that supports all standard payment methods, including domestic and international wire transfers, ACH, check deposits, and cash deposits.

In 2025, Lili added multi-currency international payments and specialized banking solutions for ecommerce platforms and non U.S. residents. Later that year, it launched the BusinessBuild credit-building program in collaboration with Dun & Bradstreet.

In 2026, Lili centralized money management for multi-employee businesses, enabling multiple users to access an account with clear permissions and full visibility and so eliminating the need for shared logins. Additionally in 2026, Lili began offering services aimed at high-revenue businesses: high-yield savings accounts, expanded FDIC insurance, and expedited payment methods.
