= Elisabeth DeMarse =

American businessperson

Elisabeth DeMarse is an American businesswoman and the former Chairwoman, CEO, and President of TheStreet.com. As of 2022, she is a board member of the NYC-based ad-fraud prevention and marketing company Kubient Inc.

== Early life and education ==
DeMarse grew up in Charlotte, North Carolina and graduated from Charlotte Country Day School. She received her A.B. course degree from Wellesley College and her MBA degree from Harvard Business School.

Her father, Samuel Cummings Hair, ran Interstate Advertising, an outdoor and airport display company in North Carolina. Her mother, Liz Hair, was Chairman of the Board of Commissioners for Mecklenburg County. At age 15, she founded an alternative newspaper, The Naked Truth, and was editor of The Country Day Monitor.

== Career ==
DeMarse began her career in politics by serving on the Senate Committee on Presidential Campaign Activities (aka The Watergate Committee) and then as an aide to Congressman Edward I. Koch. DeMarse went with Koch to New York’s City Hall when he became Mayor. Koch named DeMarse to a four-year term on the New York Commission on the Status of Women in 1985.

=== Bloomberg, L.P. ===
After graduating from Harvard Business School, DeMarse became assistant to Robert Flanagan, CEO of Western Union. In 1988, she joined Michael Bloomberg's Bloomberg as head of marketing. While at Bloomberg, DeMarse launched eight businesses, including Bloomberg.com. She launched the Bloomberg series of cartoon books with The New Yorker magazine. While serving at Bloomberg, DeMarse compiled The Portable Bloomberg: The Wit and Wisdom of Michael Bloomberg, a collection of aphorisms and sayings by the company's founder.

=== Bankrate, Inc. ===
While at Bloomberg, DeMarse created and ran Bloomberg Personal Finance, then termed “Personal Wealth.” In 2000, she was recruited by former Forbes publisher Jeff Cunningham to run iLife. At that time, iLife was in financial trouble and ranked #7 on the March 2000 Barron’s “Burn Rate” list. Two quarters later, ad revenues had increased, and the company's cash flow returned to break-even levels. The stock price rose from $0.18 to $26 per share. She re-branded the company as Bankrate.com. In 2000, Bankrate's unique visitors grew from 700,000 to 5 million. In 2004, Bankrate reported $14 million in net income. On November 1, 2001, DeMarse testified before the US Congress on the impact of 9/11 on the credit card billing of the consumer. DeMarse also testified before the Subcommittee on Financial Institutions and Consumer Credit, regarding the ‘unfairness’ of consumer late fees brought about by the events of 9/11. Subsequently, some issuers, notably Capital One, cancelled their late fees.

=== President and CEO, DeMarseCo ===
In 2006, she founded DeMarseCo in partnership with venture capitalist Austin Ventures. DeMarseCo acquired multiple tech companies, including ClickSuccess, Freedom Marketing, and All Star Directories.

=== President and CEO, CreditCards.com ===
DeMarse became president and CEO of CreditCards.com. Under DeMarse's leadership, the company was twice named to the Inc. 500, and as a recipient of the Association for Corporate Growth award. She received the Working Mother of the Year award in 2008. CreditCards.com was acquired by Bankrate in 2010.

=== CEO, Newser.com ===
On October 17, 2010, after the sale of Creditcards.com to Bankrate, it was announced that DeMarse would undertake the role as CEO of Newser, an internet news publisher listed at the #25 most influential internet publication by OMMA. On February 28, 2011, Andrew Ross Sorkin disclosed that Newser’s pending acquisition of Salon.com had failed.

=== Chairman, President and CEO, TheStreet, Inc. ===
On March 7, 2012, TheStreet.com announced that DeMarse was hired as CEO and president, replacing outgoing CEO Daryl Otte, effective immediately. She was named Chairman April 16, 2012. On September 12, 2012, TheStreet acquired The Deal, LLC. On April 22, 2013, TheStreet acquired three properties from DealFlow Media: The DealFlow Report, The Life Settlements Report, and the PrivateRaise database.

== Philanthropies ==
DeMarse has contributed to the Bill T. Jones/Arnie Zane Dance Company for 20 years, serving as secretary, treasurer, and President of the Board.

== Public company boards ==
DeMarse has been a board member of Edgar Online, YP Corporation, InsWeb Corporation, Heska Corporation, Internet Patents Corporation, Incredimail.com, and Stockgroup. She is currently a board member of Kubient Inc.
