= Clay Routledge =

Clay Routledge is an American psychologist.

== Books ==
- Supernatural: Death, Meaning, and the Power of the Invisible World (Oxford University Press, 2018)
- Past Forward: How Nostalgia Can Help You Live a More Meaningful Life (St. Martin's Essentials, 2023)

He contributed to The Walking Dead Psychology: Psych of the Living Dead, Star Wars Psychology: Dark Side of the Mind, and Star Trek Psychology: The Mental Frontier.
