= Mercantile agency =

Organisation which supplies commercial information about businesses

Mercantile agencies, or commercial agencies, are organizations that are designed to collect, record, and distribute to regular clients information relative to the standing of commercial firms. They thus act as a sort of clearing house of information on customers' reliability.

In Great Britain and other some European countries, trade protective societies composed of merchants and tradesmen have been formed for the promotion of trade; their members exchange information regarding the standing of business houses. The societies had their origin in the associations formed in the mid-18th century for the purpose of disseminating information regarding bankruptcies, assignments and bills of sale.

The mercantile agency in the United States is a much more comprehensive organization and came into existence after the financial crisis of 1837. Trade in the United States had become scattered over a wide territory, communications were slow, and town merchants lacked adequate information as to the standing of many businessmen seeking credit. The severity of the collapse of 1837 was partly caused by to the insufficiency of that information. New York City merchants had suffered so severely that they were determined to organize a headquarters where reports regarding the standing of customers could be exchanged. Lewis Tappan (1788–1873), the founder of the Journal of Commerce (1828) and a prominent abolitionist leader, undertook the work by establishing there in 1841 the Mercantile Agency, later Dun & Bradstreet Corporation, the first organization of its kind. The system has been developed and extended since then.

== See also ==
- Dun & Bradstreet
- Credit rating agencies
- The Registry, an equivalent for landlords
