= SupportSave =

American company

SupportSave Solutions, Inc.
- Company type: Publicly Traded
- Traded as: OTC Pink: SSVE
- Industry: Business Services, Offshore outsourcing
- Founded: 2007
- Headquarters: 405 E, 12450 South Suite M, Draper, UT 84020
- Key people: Christopher Johns (CEO), Rahul Singh (General Manager)
- Products: Offshore Services
- Revenue: $18 million (est.) (2010)
- Number of employees: 1400 (end 2010)
- Website: www.SupportSave.com

SupportSave Solutions, Inc. (NASDAQ BB: SSVE) is a US-based offshore business process outsourcing (BPO) company that provides customer relationship management services, transcription and captioning, and back office support. The company serves clients in a variety of industries such as travel and hospitality, financial services, technology, telecommunications, consumer products, healthcare and insurance, entertainment and education, and law enforcement.

SupportSave is based in Los Angeles, California, but it also holds operations in the Philippines. For its fiscal year ending May 31, 2009, SupportSave reported 96% revenue growth over its previous fiscal year.

== Corporate affairs ==
=== Current executives ===
- Christopher Johns, Founder, Chairman, and Chief Executive Officer
- Rahul Singh, General Manager

== History ==
SupportSave was founded on May 2, 2007, by Christopher Johns. Its original business model was to provide outsourced web-based customer management services to internet-based companies via chat and e-mail. During that period, SupportSave had 100 clients and 400 employees and was essentially a call center taking no calls. Today SupportSave has over 1500 employees, operates on 3 continents, and serves companies in retail, e-retail, technology, energy and travel. Its clients include; Office Depot, OfficeMax, Greyhound Lines, DocuSign, Harvard Business Publishing, US Auto Parts, Yellow Pages (YP.com), Checkpoint Software, Westinghouse, Element and Major Energy.
