= Atento =

Customer Experience Management

- Type: Société Anonyme
- Traded as: NYSE: ATTO
- Industry: Business Process Outsourcing
- Founded: 1999
- Key people: Carlos López-Abadía (CEO & member of board of directors)
- Services: Customer Care, Sales, Credit management, Back Office, Service Desk, Technical Support
- Number of employees: 154,000
- Website: http://www.atento.com

Atento is a global provider of customer relationship management (CRM) and business-process outsourcing (BPO) services, including customer care, sales, collections, back office and technical support. Atento was the largest provider in Latin America, and among the top five providers globally, based on revenues in 2015. The Company tops the Latin American market with 17.3% market share at the regional level according to Frost & Sullivan. Atento's CEO Carlos López-Abadía, formerly of DXC Technology, was appointed in 2019, replacing Alejandro Reynal.

As of 2016, Atento had developed 100 "customer relationship centers" across 14 countries. Atento has over 400 clients to whom it offers CRM/BPO services through multiple channels. Atento's clients are mostly multinational corporations in sectors such as telecommunications, banking and financial services, health, retail and public administrations, among others.

The company trades under the symbol ATTO on the New York Stock Exchange (NYSE) and operates through three segments: EMEA, Americas and Brazil. Atento has 93 contact centers in 13 countries: Argentina, Brazil, Chile, Colombia, El Salvador, Guatemala, Mexico, Morocco, Panama, Peru, Puerto Rico, Spain, United States and Uruguay.

== History ==
In 2000, Atento was launched in Spain, when Telefónica grouped its call center business in Spain and other Latin American countries into a subsidiary business unit.

Sale and flotation

In October 2012, Telefónica agreed to sell Atento to Bain Capital for $1.3bn. Under the terms of the deal, Atento would continue to provide services to the Telefónica Group for at least nine years after the agreement.

IPO

In September 2014, Atento announces launch of Initial Public Offering (IPO). In October, the company filed with the U.S. Securities and Exchange Commissions for a $300 million IPO. Atento hired the investment-banking units of Morgan Stanley & Co (MS.N), Credit Suisse Group AG CSGN.VX and Brazil's Itaú Unibanco Holding SA (ITUB4.SA) to handle the transaction.

=== Divestments ===
In 2014 Atento announced the sale of its operations in the Czech Republic to Comdata SPA to continue strengthening its focus on its core markets.

In 2015 Atento announced the sale of its operations in Morocco to Intelcia Group. Atento's operations in Morocco, which provide services to the Spanish market were excluded from the transaction and continue operating as part of Atento Spain.

Atento Digital

Atento Digital was launched in 2017 as a unit to integrate all of the company's digital assets and was a move aimed at client value add and overall growth. Before the launch of the unit, digital services accounted for only 6% of the company's revenues. The 2018 acquisition of a minority stake in Keepcon enhanced this unit by expanding the artificial intelligence and automation capabilities of the unit through a strategic partnership.

=== Acquisitions and Partnerships ===
In 2016 Atento acquired a majority stake in R Brasil Solucoes to expand collections and digital collections capabilities.

In 2017 the company acquired a majority stake in Interfile, founded in 1991, as a move into Brazilian banking and financial services. At the time of the action, Interlife had more than 1,700 staff and 30 offices in Brazil. A second Brazil-focused alliance formed between Atento and Falconi, a Latin American consulting firm, the same year; this fulfilled a standing desire of Falconi to work with a high technology partner.

In 2018, Atento also reached a partnership with T-Systems, on the provision of data center services in Brazil, and with Unimed Rio in Brazil to modernize its customer relationship structure.

== Awards and recognitions ==
Atento has subsequently been recognized by Great Place to Work® as one of the 25 World's Best Multinational Workplaces in 5 different occasions and one of the 25 Latin America Best Multinationals to Work for 8 consecutive years. The company has also been recognized as one of the Best Workplaces in some of the countries where it operates, including Spain, Brazil or Argentina. The company has maintained the recognition by Great Place to Work® in Uruguay, Mexico, Peru, Chile, Colombia and Central America and the Caribbean.

The company has also been awarded several times the IMT awards in Mexico, ABEMD awards in Brazil, CRC Gold Awards, including as Best Customer Service Outsourcer in Spain in 2018 and ranked as the second most innovative company in Brazil's service sector, according to Valor Econômico.

Also for several years has Atento been named a Leader in Gartner's Magic Quadrant for Customer Management Contact Center BPO.

== Acquisition by ABAI ==
In November 2025, the company was acquired by ABAI. This deal allowed Atento to divest its operations in Spain to focus on AI-driven customer experience (CX) markets in the United States and Latin America. The acquisition includes Atento's Spain unit and its Morocco operations, creating a leading BPO player in the region.
