= Luria's =

Defunct Chain Of Retail Stores In Florida

L. Luria & Son (Luria's Department Stores)
- Founded: 1961
- Founder: Leonard Luria
- Defunct: 1997
- Fate: Chapter 11 Bankruptcy And Liquidation Sale
- Headquarters: Miami Lakes, Florida
- Number of locations: 10 (1979); 39 (1987); 60 (1990); 48 (1995); 17 (early 1997); 6 (late 1997)

Luria's (originally L. Luria & Son) was a chain of catalog showroom stores in Florida, from 1961 to 1997.

== History ==
The company's history can be traced as far back as 1898, with the founding of a silverware and gifts wholesaler based in Manhattan by Lazar Luria.

Luria's started in 1961, when founder Leonard Luria, son of Joseph Luria, moved to South Florida and opened a store at 980 SW 1st Street in Miami. The company went public in 1978, and by 1979, had a total of 10 stores. Despite rough years from 1984–1986, the company had begun to improve by 1987, reaching 39 stores and a catalog circulation of 1 million copies. In 1986, it had opened a new prototype store in Sanford, Florida, which stressed the profitable jewelry counter by placing it in the center of the store, and also included modernized signage and counters. The chain reached its peak of 60 stores in 1990, and in 1993, began opening larger format, self-service stores, in an attempt to escape the declining catalog showroom format.

The chain began to decline into the mid-1990s, and by January 1995, had shrunk to 48 stores, of which 9 were the new self-service format. Another move further emphasizing its new focus on a self-service, "superstore" concept was the discontinuation of its annual catalog that same year. The company was purchased by Rachmil and Ilia Lekach in 1996, taking the company out of Luria family ownership for the first time in its history. Under Lekach ownership, perfume, produced by Parlux, of which Ilia Lekach was CEO and chairman, was to become a major focus, along with kitchenware and kitchen furniture, while phasing out electronics. Luria's entered 1997 in further decline; pulling out of both the Jacksonville and Tampa Bay markets that year in a wave of 17 closures, leaving the company at only 17 total stores. In late 1997, the company, further reduced to 6 stores, filed for Chapter 11 Bankruptcy, citing a weakened retail market, the death of the catalog showroom concept, and competition from specialty stores such as Circuit City. The final store closed by mid-December that year.

Company founder Leonard Luria died on September 3, 2012, age 89.

== Community impact ==
Chain founder Leonard Luria is considered a philanthropist in the area, making investments in Israel Bonds and making donations to the Greater Miami Jewish Federation and the Mount Sinai Medical Center. He was also involved in the American Friends of the Hebrew University, the Concert Association Of Miami, and the American Friends of Tel Aviv University. He was also known for hiring a large number of Cuban immigrants in the 1960s, including former Cuban diplomats, due to their knowledge of china and silver at embassy dinners, and was said to have left the Miami Chamber of Commerce due to what was perceived as anti-Cuban rhetoric.
