= DialAmerica =

American telemarketing company

- Company type: Private
- Industry: Telemarketing
- Founded: 1957
- Headquarters: Mahwah, New Jersey, U.S.
- Key people: Chris Conway, President, CEO; Gerhard Lindenmayer, Information Security Officer
- Number of employees: 5,000
- Website: www.dialamerica.com

DialAmerica is a telemarketing company. It originated with the establishment of the first-ever call center by the Life Circulation Company in 1957. In 1963, the company developed a sales campaign to support local sports teams and not-for-profit organizations. Time Inc. magazine spun off and sold their telephone subscription unit to Life Circulation Co. in 1976, forming DialAmerica Marketing. Time Inc. had developed a model of magazine sales using the telephone.

Since 1976, the company has expanded with services extending to areas including banking (GE Capital Bank, U.S. Bank, Fifth Third Bank, etc.) and internet services (including America Online and Compuserve). DialAmerica also extends services for over 300 magazine publications, calling on behalf of large publishers like Condé Nast for magazines including Reader's Digest, People and Us Weekly.

== Legal activity ==
In 2004, DialAmerica filed papers with the Federal Communications Commission seeking a national exemption from do-not-call lists.
