= Contact Centre Cymru =

Call centre company

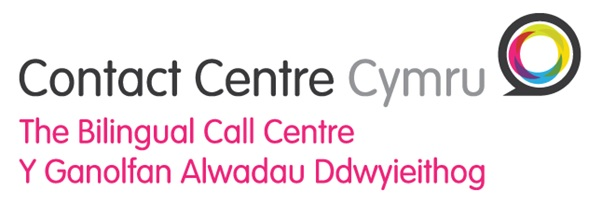
- Formation: 2005
- Headquarters: Penrhyndeudraeth, North Wales
- Region served: Wales
- Website: Contact Centre Cymru
- services delivered: Customer service to the public; Lost property enquiries; Complaint handling; Social media handling; Booking enquiries

Contact Centre Cymru is a bilingual Contact Centre, based in Penrhyndeudraeth, North Wales. Owned and managed as a business unit of PTI Cymru Ltd, it provides a Contact Centre service to a range of businesses across Wales and the UK, including Traveline Cymru., Bwcabus, First Cymru, Severn Trent Water, National Rail Enquiries and Arriva Trains Wales.

Contact Centre Cymru has been in operation since 2005. In 2012, the Contact Centre started to exploit its bilingual expertise by offering similar Welsh Language services to different transport organisations and now operates several commercial contracts.

Contact Centre Cymru delivers the Traveline Cymru telephone service, providing bus and train time information via a freephone number. This number is free to call from mobile phones as well as landline numbers.

== History ==
In 2011, the previous owners experienced financial difficulties which threatened the continued provision of the Traveline Cymru telephone information service. As a result, the contact centre was brought in house under PTI Cymru/Traveline Cymru management in 2012.

Contact Centre Cymru worked with a number of partners, including; CPT UK, which is the trade association representing the UK's bus and coach industries. ATCO, the Association of Transport Coordinating Officers, which brings together local authority officers involved with passenger transport, and Carmarthenshire County Council
