= Dun & Bradstreet =

American business data company

Dun & Bradstreet Holdings, Inc.
- Type: Private
- Traded as: NYSE: DNB
- Industry: Commercial & professional services
- Founded: July 20, 1841; 185 years ago (as The Mercantile Agency); March 1933 (as R.G. Dun-Bradstreet)
- Founders: Lewis Tappan; Robert Graham Dun; John M. Bradstreet
- Headquarters: Jacksonville, Florida, U.S.
- Key people: Bill Foley (chairman); Steve Tulenko (CEO); Christina Clohecy (CFO)
- Products: Business information; Credit & risk; Sales & marketing; Data analytics; Supply & compliance
- Revenue: ▲US$2.38 billion (2024)
- Operating income: ▲US$195 million (2024)
- Net income: ▲US$−25 million (2024)
- Total assets: ▼US$8.76 billion (2024)
- Total equity: ▼US$3.31 billion (2024)
- Owner: Clearlake Capital
- Number of employees: 6,247 (2024)
- Website: www.dnb.com

The Dun & Bradstreet Holdings, Inc. (D&B) is an American company that provides commercial data, analytics, and insights for businesses. Headquartered in Jacksonville, Florida, the company offers a wide range of products and services for risk and financial analysis, operations and supply, and sales and marketing professionals, as well as research and insights on global business issues. It serves customers in government and industries such as communications, technology, strategic financial services, and retail, telecommunications, and manufacturing markets. The company's database contains over 500 million business records worldwide.

== History ==
=== 19th century ===
Dun & Bradstreet traces its history to July 20, 1841, with formation of The Mercantile Agency in New York City by Lewis Tappan. Recognizing the need for a centralized credit reporting system, Tappan formed the company to create a network of correspondents who would provide reliable, objective credit information to subscribers. As an advocate for civil rights, Tappan used his abolitionist connections to expand and update the company's credit information.

Despite accusations of personal privacy invasion, by 1844 the Mercantile Agency had over 280 clients. The agency continued to expand, opening offices in Boston, Philadelphia, and Baltimore. By 1849, Tappan retired, allowing Benjamin Douglass to take over the growing business.

In 1859, Douglass transferred the company to Robert Graham Dun, who immediately changed the firm's name to R. G. Dun & Company. Over the next 40 years, Graham Dun continued to expand the business across international boundaries.

=== 20th century ===
In March 1933, R. G. Dun & Company merged with competitor John M. Bradstreet to form Dun & Bradstreet. The merger was engineered by Dun's CEO, Arthur Whiteside. Whiteside's successor, J. Wilson Newman, worked to extend the company's range of products and services, expanding the company dramatically during the 1960s by engineering ways to apply new technologies to evolving operations.

Moody's credit reporting agency was acquired by Dun & Bradstreet in 1962. The Dun & Bradstreet Data Universal Numbering System (D&B D-U-N-S Number) was devised in 1963.

Other companies acquired during the 1960s and 1970s included yellow pages creator R.H. Donnelley, Official Airline Guides, Thomas Y. Crowell Co., Funk & Wagnalls, Technical Publishing, McCormack & Dodge, and Corinthian Broadcasting, all since divested.

In 1986, Dun & Bradstreet acquired the education data company Market Data Retrieval (MDR). That year, Dun & Bradstreet sold Technical Publishing to Cahners Publishing.

In 1996, the company restructured, creating three entities: Dun & Bradstreet, Nielsen, and the Cognizant Corporation. Cognizant Corporation included Nielsen TV Ratings, Gartner Group, Clarke-O'Neill, Erisco, and several other lesser known entities.

In June 1998, Dex One was formed as spin-off transaction from Dun & Bradstreet Corporation. That July 1, Dun & Bradstreet split into two companies, one assuming the Dun & Bradstreet name while the other adopted R.H. Donnelley as its name.

In 1999, Cognizant Corporation spun off Nielsen TV Ratings, then divested its holdings, to rebrand as IMS Health. IMS Health continued with its holding company, later known as Cognizant.

=== 21st century ===
In 2000, Dun & Bradstreet spun off the Moody's Corporation. In 2001, it acquired software database company Harris InfoSource International, Inc. In 2003, the company acquired Hoover's, a business reporting service.

On February 5, 2003, Dun & Bradstreet restated prior period results to correct timing errors in recognizing some of the revenue associated with 14 of the company's 200+ products, after reviewing its revenue recognition from 1997 through 2002. In 2007, Dun & Bradstreet acquired AllBusiness.com and sold the company in 2012.

In August 2010, Dun & Bradstreet spun off and sold its credit monitoring and management business to a newly formed company, Dun & Bradstreet Credibility Corp. Between 2010 and 2014, the Federal Trade Commission received over 670 complaints against Dun & Bradstreet, including at least 139 that named D&B Credibility.

In October 2013, Bob Carrigan became the CEO of Dun & Bradstreet.

On January 5, 2015, Dun & Bradstreet acquired the data management firm NetProspex. In April 2015, Dun & Bradstreet acquired its former unit, Dun & Bradstreet Credibility Corp. In January 2017, Dun & Bradstreet acquired Avention (formerly OneSource).

On August 8, 2018, Dun & Bradstreet announced the appointment of then interim CEO Thomas J. Manning as its new CEO; at the same time they announced that the company had entered into a definitive agreement to be acquired by an investor group led by CC Capital, Cannae Holdings, and Thomas H. Lee Partners.

On February 8, 2019, the investor group completed the acquisition of Dun & Bradstreet and it became a privately held company. Its former ticker symbol, DNB, was retired. On July 1, 2020, Dun & Bradstreet re-listed shares on the New York Stock Exchange, once again trading under the ticker symbol DNB.

In January 2021, Dun & Bradstreet acquired Bisnode Business Information Group AB (“Bisnode”), a European data and analytics firm and long-standing member of the Dun & Bradstreet Worldwide Network, for 7.2 billion kr (US$818 million).

On May 20, 2021, Dun & Bradstreet announced its intention to move its global headquarters to Jacksonville, Florida.

In 2024, the company integrated business banking and financial tools of Lili into its myD&B platform.

On March 24, 2025, Dun & Bradstreet announced its agreement to be acquired by Clearlake Capital Group for 4.1 billion in cash, in a transaction valued at $7.7 billion, including debt. The acquisition was completed that August 26, and on September 3, 35-year Moody's veteran Stephen Tulenko succeeded Anthony Jabbour as CEO.

== Operations ==
The company generates revenue through subscription-based products, business information reports, data licensing agreements, strategic partnerships, and concierge services.

It operates with two segments: Americas, and non-Americas. The company divested its Latin America operations in September 2016, as were Netherlands and Belgium operations.

Australian and New Zealand operations were divested in June 2015 to Archer Capital for $169.8 million and were rebranded as Illion credit bureaus in 2018, with debt collection operations being formally rebranded as Milton Graham on 14 June 2018.

Americas consists of:

- The United States and Canada

Non-Americas consists of:

- Europe
- The United Kingdom
- Ireland
- China
- Hong Kong
- Taiwan
- India

== Products and services ==
Dun & Bradstreet offers various products and services solving for credit, risk, marketing, sales, analytics, and more, including D&B Hoovers, Master Data, and D&B Data Exchange.

== See also ==
- Credit rating agencies
- Mercantile agencies
