= Weingarten Realty =

Weingarten Realty Investors
- Industry: Real estate investment trust
- Founded: 1948; 78 years ago
- Defunct: August 4, 2021; 4 years ago
- Fate: Acquired by Kimco Realty
- Headquarters: Houston, Texas
- Key people: Stanford Alexander (chairman); Andrew M. Alexander (CEO); Stephen C. Richter (CFO)
- Revenue: ▼$433 million (2020)
- Net income: ▼$118 million (2020)
- Total assets: ▲$3.961 billion (2020)
- Total equity: ▼$1.800 billion (2020)
- Number of employees: 243 (2020)

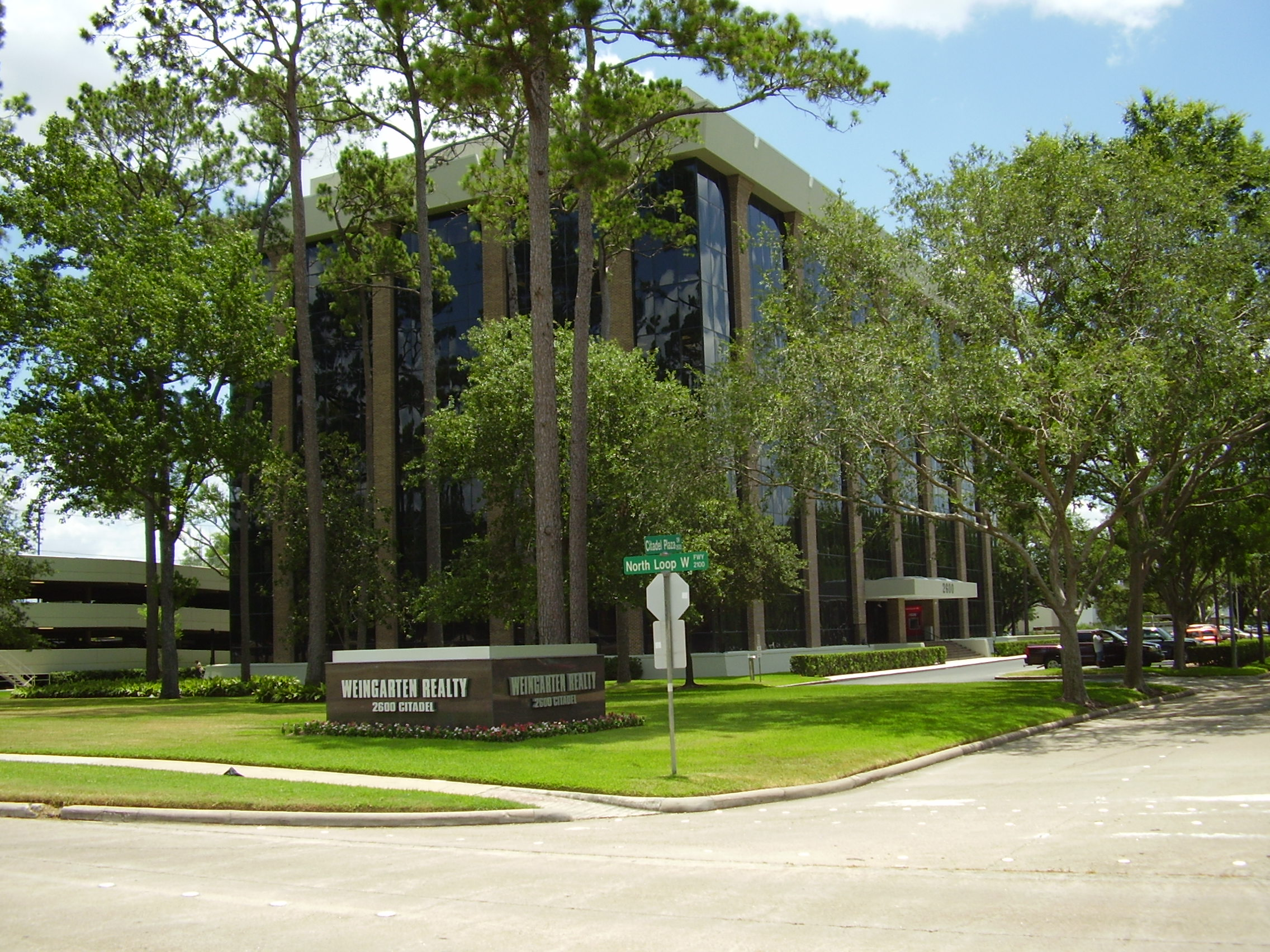
Former Weingarten Realty headquarters

Weingarten Realty Investors was a real estate investment trust that invested in shopping centers, primarily in the Southern United States and primarily with grocery stores as the anchor stores. In August 2021, the company was acquired by Kimco Realty.

As of December 31, 2020, the company owned interests in 159 properties comprising 30.2 million square feet. In 2020, 20.6% of the company's revenues were generated from properties in the Houston area and 30.4% of the company's revenues were generated from properties in Texas.

== History ==
In the 1880s, Hersch Harris Weingarten, a poor Jewish immigrant from Łańcut (what was then Austria-Hungary), started a grocery business in Houston called Weingarten's.

In 1948, Joseph Joe Weingarten, the eldest son of Harris Weingarten founded Weingarten Realty to build stores for his father's business. In 1980, Safeway Inc. purchased the grocery operations.

In 1985, the company became a public company via an initial public offering.

In 2002, the company acquired 3 shopping centers for $46.2 million.

In 2012, the company sold all of its industrial assets for $382.4 million.

In August 2021, Kimco Realty acquired the company.
