= Televerde =

American multinational organization

- Type: Private
- Founded: 1994
- Founders: Ronald Bell and Charles Monroe
- Headquarters: Phoenix, Arizona; United States
- Key people: Vince Barsolo (CEO) Yolanda Slan (Chief HR Officer) Michelle Cirocco (Chief Social Responsibility Officer) Alicia Rasta (Head of Sales) Kellie Walenciak (Head of Brand Communications)

Televerde is an American multinational sales and marketing organization located in Phoenix, Arizona. The company partners with organizations such as SAP, Adobe-Marketo, GE, Micro Focus and Interstate Batteries.

Televerde provides incarcerated women inside five U.S. prison facilities with on-the-job training. The women are hired, compensated, skilled in the basics of sales and marketing, and certified in technologies such as Outreach, Marketo, Salesforce and Eloqua. Approximately 60 percent of the Televerde global workforce is made up of incarcerated women.

== History ==
Televerde was founded in 1994 by Ronald Bell and Charles Monroe. James Hooker acquired the majority of the holding company, Pegasus Research Inc., in 1995 and served as president and CEO until he retired in November 2018.

The company's business model began as a partnership with Arizona Correctional Industries. Its first headquarters was a former Best Western hotel located in Phoenix with five incarcerated women working in a single-wide trailer on the grounds of the Arizona Center for Women.

In 1998, the company moved to its current headquarters in Phoenix, Arizona. In 2001, correctional resources transferred to the Arizona Department of Corrections at Perryville Correctional Facility, and with this move, Televerde opened up two contact centers within the prison facility.

Expansion inside Perryville continued with the opening of a third contact center in 2005 and a fourth in 2007. In 2009, the first sales development team was created at Televerde's corporate headquarters. In 2012, another expansion inside Perryville added a fifth contact center.

In March 2015, Televerde expanded its business model to Indiana, opening a contact center inside the Rockville Correctional Facility in Rockville, Indiana.

Global expansion began in May 2015. The Latin American (LATAM) headquarters opened in Córdoba, Argentina, where the company originally white-labeled through Affinitas, offering marketing and sales services branded as Televerde. The company then opened its European headquarters in Glasgow, Scotland in April 2016 followed by an Asia Pacific (APAC) office in Melbourne, Australia in November 2017.

Morag Lucey was named CEO of Televerde in January 2019.

Expansion for Televerde continued in the United States. In December 2019, the company opened a contact center (its 10th center globally) inside the Madison Correctional Facility in Indiana. This is the second Indiana prison in which Televerde has operations and the seventh contact center staffed entirely by incarcerated females.

In January 2020, The Arizona State University’s Seidman Research Institute released the findings of a study that reviewed the economic, social and fiscal impact of Televerde's prison workforce development program on individuals, families, and the State of Arizona.

Two months later, in March 2020, Televerde formed Televerde Foundation under the leadership of Televerde Chief Social Responsibility Officer Michelle Cirocco. The non-profit organization provides reentry support and personal and professional development programs to formerly and currently incarcerated women.

Televerde expanded into the Homestead Correctional Institution in Florida in March 2021 with the opening of its 11th contact center globally. This expansion marks the third U.S. state in which Televerde has prison-run operations. The opening of this center was originally planned for 2020 but was delayed due to the COVID-19 pandemic.

In June 2021, the company announced its partnership with the UK Ministry of Justice (MOJ) with the opening of its first European contact center staffed entirely by female prisoners located inside Her Majesty's Prison Styal (HMP Styal) in Wilmslow, Cheshire, England. It is an extension of Televerde's European Headquarters in Glasgow, Scotland, which was opened in 2016.

Televerde's partnership with the UK Ministry of Justice ended in December 2021, and the HMP Styal contact center was closed.

In January 2022, CEO Morag Lucey retired from Televerde.

Televerde named Chris McGugan CEO of Televerde in November 2022.

Televerde opened a new contact center at the Indiana Women’s Prison in July 2023. This addition joined the company’s existing operations in Indiana at the Rockville Correctional Facility (opened in 2015) and the Madison Correctional Facility (opened in 2019), further expanding its nationwide network to eight prison-operated centers.

Vince Barsolo succeeded Chris McGugan as CEO in June 2024.

In August 2025, the Florida Department of Corrections ended its partnership with Televerde, resulting in the closure of the company’s Florida-based contact center.

== Locations and Services ==
Televerde headquarters is at 2800 N Central Ave, Suite 500, Phoenix, AZ 85004. The company operates in Goodyear, Arizona; Phoenix, Arizona; Homestead, Florida; Indianapolis, Indiana; Madison, Indiana; Rockville, Indiana; Cordoba, Argentina; Melbourne, Australia; and Glasgow, Scotland.

Televerde has a global workforce of 600+ that serve clients in more than 30 languages in the following industries: Manufacturing, Computer Software, Consumer Products, Professional Services, and IT Services.
