= D&B Hoovers =

American business research company

- Type: Information and technology services
- Industry: D&B Hoovers LTD
- Founded: 1990
- Headquarters: Austin, Texas, US
- Key people: Gary Hoover, Co-Founder; Patrick Spain, Co-Founder; Thomas Manning, Interim CEO
- Parent: Dun & Bradstreet
- Website: www.hoovers.com

D&B Hoovers was founded by Gary Hoover and Patrick Spain in 1990 as an American business research company that provided information on companies and industries through their primary product platform named "Hoover's". In 2003, it was acquired by Dun & Bradstreet and operated for a time as a wholly owned subsidiary. In 2017, the Hoover's product was re-branded D&B Hoovers. Dun & Bradstreet is headquartered in Jacksonville, Florida, US.

== History ==
Hoovers was started in 1990 by Gary Hoover, Patrick J. Spain, Alan Chai, and Alta Campbell. Hoover's was initially called The Reference Press, as it published reference books about companies.

The company grew rapidly under a business team led by Spain. This team included Carl Shepherd, Lynn Atchison, Elisabeth DeMarse, Jani Spede, Kris Rao, and Gordon Anderson, among others. Spain was CEO from 1993 to 2001, and chairman from 1994 to 2002.

Hoovers made an initial public offering on the NASDAQ exchange in 1999. The company then became a subsidiary of Dun & Bradstreet, which bought Hoover's for $119 million in 2003. After the acquisition of Avention by Dun & Bradstreet in 2017, D&B Hoovers was launched, and replaced the existing Hoovers' product.

== Operations ==
Dun & Bradstreet combines its data with Avention's sales acceleration platform. Subscriptions are sold primarily to sales, marketing, and business development professionals seeking contact information for prospective customers. Besides publishing information through the D&B Hoovers product, information is also distributed via data feeds and third-party licensing agreements.

== See also ==
- List of companies based in Austin, Texas
