= Bisnode =

Bisnode AB
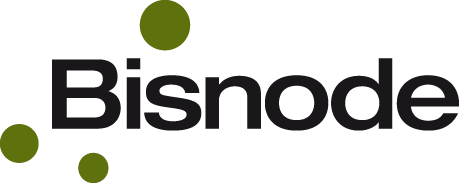
- Company type: Publicly traded Aktiebolag
- Industry: Business information, information technology, services, research, software
- Founded: 1989
- Headquarters: Stockholm, Sweden
- Area served: Europe
- Key people: Magnus Silfverberg (CEO), Ingrid E. Engström (Chairman)
- Revenue: SEK 3.935 million (2012)
- Operating income: SEK 64.1 million (2012)
- Net income: SEK 205.8 million (2012)
- Total assets: SEK 5.912 billion (end 2012)
- Total equity: SEK 0.847 billion (end 2012)
- Owner: Dun and Bradstreet
- Number of employees: 2,893 (end 2012)
- Website: bisnode.com

Bisnode was a company that offers decision support in the form of digital business, marketing and credit information. Founded in 1989, Bisnode was owned 70 percent by Ratos and 30 percent by Bonnier. In 2020. Dun and Bradstreet acquired Bisnode for $811.60 million. Bisnode is present in 19 European countries and has its headquarters in Stockholm, Sweden. The company's revenue is just under SEK 4 billion.

== History ==
Bisnode traces its roots back to Sveriges Handelskalendar, a trade directory which was founded in 1859 and became the starting pistol for Bonnier's business-information operations. In 1982, Bonnier-owned Affärsdata started publishing business information digitally. In 1986, Bonnier gave tech entrepreneur Lars Save and Bonnier executive Håkan Ramsin a budget of 15 million SEK to create a business plan for making digital business information services profitable.

In 1989, Bisnode's predecessor Bonnier Business Services was founded. During the first half of the 1990s, the company carried out a number of acquisitions of different sizes. It specialized in purchasing problem companies and making them flourish. In 1999, Bonnier's business information was separated from the customer-information operations and named Bonnier Affärsinformation (BAF). In 2005, the private equity company Ratos acquired 70 percent of BAF, which purchased Infodata from Ratos.

In 2006, the group was renamed Bisnode. In 2012, under the leadership of the new CEO Lars Pettersson, a significant change was set in motion, with the goal to unite all Bisnode-owned companies in Europe under the Bisnode brand. Completed in 2014, Bisnode's 9 400 square-meter head-office building is situated alongside the E4 in Solna.

As of December 2020, Bisnode was acquired by Dun & Bradstreet.

== Bisnode’s CEOs ==
- Lars Save 1989–2008
- Johan Wall 2008–2012
- Lars Pettersson 2012–2015
- Magnus Silfverberg 2015 - 2020

== Staff ==
Bisnode had around 3 000 employees in 19 European countries. About 1 000 (a third) of the group's people are based in Sweden and makeup around half of Bisnode's revenue. Broken down by sex, approximately 46 percent of Bisnode's employees are female and 54 per cent are male. The average age is 34.

== International offices ==
Bisnode has offices in these 19 countries:

- Sweden
- Switzerland
- Denmark
- Slovakia
- Norway
- Hungary
- Finland
- Czech Republic
- Estonia
- Croatia
- Belgium
- Bosnia and Hercegovina
- Netherlands
- Serbia
- France
- Poland
- Germany
- Slovenia
- Austria

== See also ==
- Experian
