= Atlanta Marathon =

Road running event in Atlanta, Georgia

- The Atlanta Marathon logo
- Date: Last weekend of February or first weekend of March
- Location: Atlanta, Georgia
- Event type: Road
- Distance: Marathon; Half Marathon; 5K run
- Primary sponsor: Publix
- Established: March 25, 2007; 19 years ago
- Course records: Men: 2:18:50 (2008); Oleg Marusin; Women: 2:41:12 (2008); Alena Vinnitskaya
- Website: www.atlantamarathon.org

The Atlanta Marathon (branded Publix Atlanta Marathon for sponsorship reasons) is an annual marathon held in Atlanta, Georgia, although in previous years it has been held in DeKalb and Henry Counties. On the same day, a half marathon is also held, and some years also feature a 5K run. Of Atlanta's four major races in the Ultimate Peach series from the Atlanta Track Club, it is the oldest continuously running race of the four. The Atlanta Marathon has been run continuously since 2007, the PNC Atlanta Ten Miler since 2011, and the Peachtree Road Race and Invesco QQQ Thanksgiving Day Half Marathon continuously since 2021. 2026 marks the 20th anniversary of the Publix Atlanta Marathon weekend.Starting in 2027, the Atlanta Marathon Weekend will take place on March 6-7 and will include a new course through Downtown Atlanta.

== History ==
The first race was held on March 25, 2007, under the original sponsor-branded name ING Georgia Marathon. The race was acquired by US Road Sports in 2008. In September 2010, it was announced that Publix would be the new title sponsor for the race. In January 2014, Life Time Fitness acquired the race and operated the race in 2014 and 2015.

On December 15, 2015, the race was acquired by Atlanta Track Club, who had previously operated the Atlanta Marathon until its final running in 2013. They have operated the race since 2016. For 2019, the race has been renamed the Publix Atlanta Marathon and the course has been changed.

On February 29, 2020, a day before the Atlanta Marathon, the Atlanta Track Club hosted the U.S. Olympic marathon trials for the 2020 Summer Olympics. The course was different from the Atlanta Marathon—it looped three times so more spectators would line the course. The men's marathon trials saw Galen Rupp win in a time of 2:09:20, followed by Jacob Riley and 43-year-old Abdi Abdirahman.

The woman's race featured the largest number of competitors ever in the US Olympic Trials Marathon: 450 women qualified for the race. Aliphine Tuliamuk won with a time of 2:27:23. In second place was first-time marathoner Molly Seidel. No other woman has qualified for the U.S. Olympic Team with the trials as her first marathon. Sally Kipyego finished third, edging out Des Linden and Laura Thweatt to make the team.

On November 2, 2020, the Atlanta Track Club moved the Atlanta Marathon 40 kilometers south of Atlanta, in Henry County, Georgia on the grounds of the Atlanta Motor Speedway located in Hampton, owing concerns to Fulton County and City of Atlanta restrictions on public events during the ongoing coronavirus pandemic. The marathon and half marathon were held Sunday and utilise the oval, road course, parking lots, campgrounds, and perimeter roads of the 840 acre complex, while the 5000 metre run will be held on Saturday inside the 1.5 mile oval grounds. It was similar to the Atlanta Track Club's PNC Atlanta 10 Miler: Extreme Hill Edition originally held in Atlantic Station, which was moved to Michelin Raceway Road Atlanta, which also utilised a motorsport circuit and access roads. With the move to AMS, it will be the longest continuously held major event on the Atlanta Track Club schedule, as neither the Peachtree (1970) nor the Invesco QQQ Half Marathon (1963) were held in 2020.

== Course ==
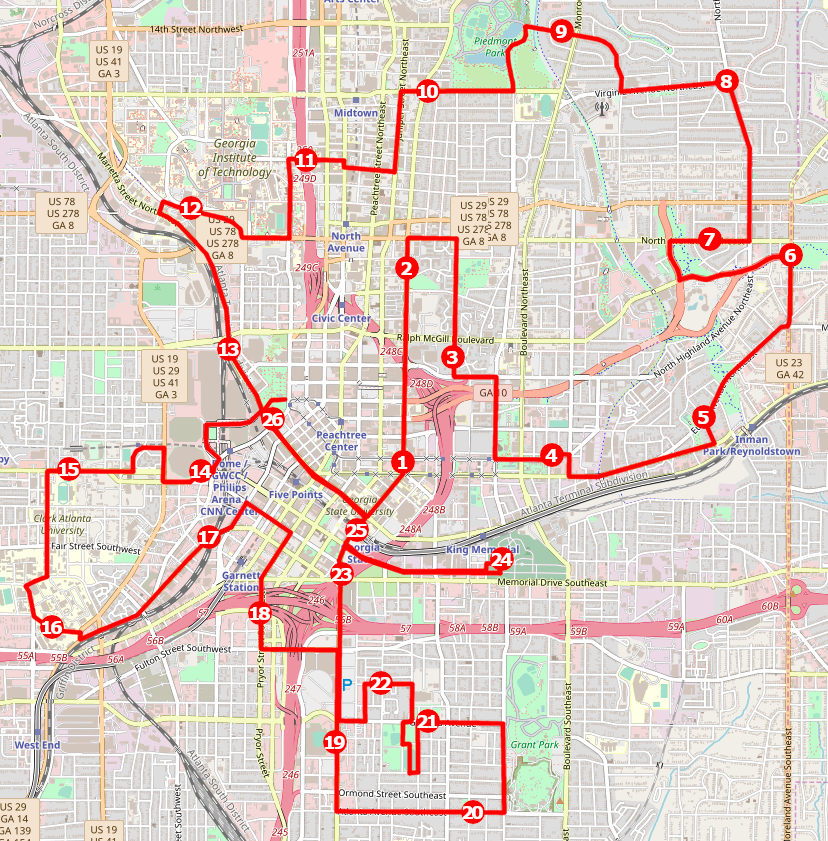
2019 course map

From 2007 to 2018, when the race was known as the Georgia Marathon, the marathon course would start and end in Atlanta but also go into the city of Decatur. When it was renamed the Atlanta Marathon for 2019, the course was redrawn to stay within Atlanta.

The 2019 course starts at ends at Centennial Olympic Park and, over 26 miles 385 yards (42.195 km) of city roads, includes many landmarks, such as Georgia State University, Martin Luther King Jr. National Historical Park, Edgewood Avenue, Inman Park, Little Five Points, Virginia–Highland, Piedmont Park, Georgia Institute of Technology, Mercedes-Benz Stadium, Morris Brown College, Morehouse College, Clark Atlanta University, Spelman College, 1996 Olympic rings, Georgia State Stadium, Grant Park and Zoo Atlanta, Cheney Stadium, Georgia State Capitol, and Oakland Cemetery.

=== Atlanta Motor Speedway 2021 Course ===
The 2021 race was held inside in the 840-acre Atlanta Motor Speedway complex in Hampton with perimeter roads around the speedway complex involved.

The course is 9.75 miles (15.69 km) in length, meaning full runners ran two laps and half runners ran one lap before entering the 1.54 mile oval. The course started in the parking lot behind the Jimmie Johnson Grandstand (had been known as the Winners before June 2020; named for the 2019 Boston Marathon celebrity finisher) on Mount Pleasant Road. Runners take the start in the parking lot on Mount Pleasant Road, crossing Perimeter Road, before starting the lap by turning right on Speedway Boulevard before a right turn on Wilkins Road, going south before crossing the turnaround past Perimeter Road and run north up Wilkins Road, running north, leaving Speedway premises before another turnaround just past Mount Pleasant Road where runners again run on the opposite direction, turning right on Speedway Boulevard and passing through Atlanta Speedway Airport and the Army Aviation Heritage Foundation and Flying Museum. Runners follow Speedway before turning left at Lower Woolsey Road, where runners proceed to the entrance ramp from Georgia 20, where another turnaround occurs. From Lower Woolsey, runners jut right into the Weaver parking lot where the course splits on the second and third laps. On the first two laps, runners then turn right on Speedway Boulevard where before turning right at the Turn 3 tunnel access road before a quick left to Richard Petty Boulevard. From Richard Petty Boulevard, runners turn left to Perimeter Road where the course turns left where runners cross the Tara Place condominiums and run on the road before making a right and a left past the end of the frontstretch grandstands. Returning to Outer Perimeter Road to concluded the lap, full marathoners turned right on Speedway Boulevard to start the second lap. At the end of the second lap, runners turn left to Speedway Boulevard and follow it to Lower Woolsey Road and continue route as the previous two laps until they reach the Weaver parking lot. Instead of turning right on Speedway Boulevard, they turn left to follow a service vehicle road that rings around Turns 1 and 2 of the speedway oval before turning left on the service vehicle road, followed by a turnaround that allows runners to access the transporters tunnel between Turns 1 and 2 to access the speedway, making a short run through the Flock Brothers Corral infield camping area before entering the speedway at the road course exit for a traditional finish to the marathon reminiscent of athletics, with runners making 1 3/4 laps around the speedway, returning to pit lane where the finish line runs parallel to the start-finish line of the speedway.

Half marathon runners start with the full first lap but follow the procedure for the second lap at the end of the lap by turning left to Speedway Boulevard and following it until they reach the Turn 1-2 tunnel entrance, where they follow the Flock Brothers Corral before making entering the speedway at the road course exit for the 1 3/4 lap run to the finish on pit lane.

== Invesco QQQ Half Marathon ==
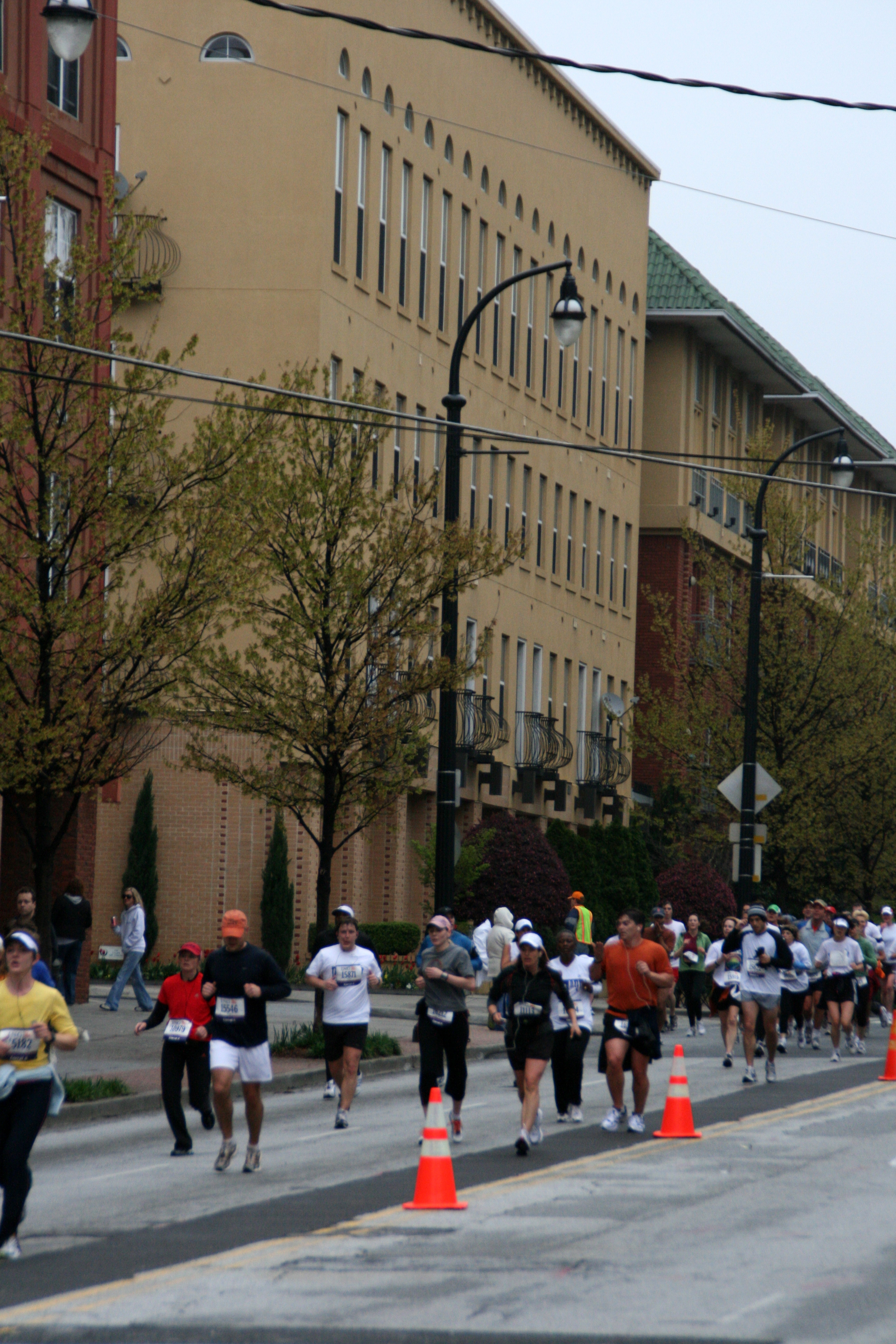
Atlanta Marathon

Before Atlanta Track Club acquired the race and renamed it to Atlanta Marathon, it had operated its own race under the Atlanta Marathon name between 1963 and 2009, and continues as the Invesco QQQ Half Marathon and 5k, with only a Half Marathon and 5k race.

The first running of what is now the Invesco QQQ Half Marathon was in 1963 at the North Fulton Golf Course, making it the oldest in the Southeast. The following year, the Atlanta Track Club was formed, and has run the event every year since. In 1966, Tim Singleton became director, and later founded the Peachtree Road Race. Fred Lebow ran in the marathon in the late 1960s, and later founded the New York City Marathon in 1970.

Since 1981, this event has been held on Thanksgiving and was believed to be the longest of several turkey trots held on Thanksgiving across the country. In 2010, the full marathon only was removed with a new race date in October and with a new loop course, while the half marathon and accompanying 5 km races continue to be held on the date. The Invesco QQQ Half Marathon and 5k continues as the largest half marathon on the holiday in the country.

The Atlanta Track Club initially cancelled the Atlanta Half Marathon in April as a result of the COVID-19 pandemic, as the Peachtree Road Race was to have taken the Invesco QQQ Half Marathon date. However, by August, the Peachtree was also cancelled.

=== Course ===
From 1964 until 1980, the race had its beginning, middle, and end at The Westminster Schools campus, twice running a loop up Nancy Creek Road.

Originally run on the weekend before Christmas, it was changed in the mid-1970s to be after the holiday. This was done in conjunction with the Peach Bowl, a bowl game held every year around New Year's Day, and it was renamed the Peach Bowl Marathon.

In 1981, the race was moved to downtown Atlanta, and the date changed to Thanksgiving in late November. This move doubled participation in the race, renamed back as the Atlanta Marathon. In 1981 and 1982, it ended in Decatur.

From 1983 to 1991, the marathon began in the suburban metro Atlanta town of Lithonia and going east through Stone Mountain, with the half-marathon beginning at the halfway point in Clarkston, and both ending in Atlanta's Piedmont Park after traversing Decatur, and the Atlanta neighborhoods of Inman Park and Virginia–Highland. This route was along the CSX railroad tracks, thus it was much less hilly than previous routes. On one occasion, the race was held for a train; on another, the train was held for the race.

From 1992 to 1996, it began and ended near Atlanta–Fulton County Stadium, running north on Piedmont Road (Georgia 237) to Peachtree Street, where it headed north and then back south. The start of the half-marathon was near the Chamblee MARTA station.

From 1997 to 2009, about 90% was run along the same course used for the 1996 Summer Olympics, ending near Center Parc Stadium (built as Centennial Olympic Stadium in the A-FC stadium parking lot). The final loop course went through many major sites within Atlanta, including the Olympic rings. Since then, the half marathon course for which is the continuation of the original Atlanta Marathon starts on Capitol Avenue, with a turn to Decatur Street, Marietta Street, through Centennial Olympic Park, Atlantic Station, Piedmont Park, where the runners run the final kilometer of the Peachtree in the other direction, before jumping to Courtland, Street, Irwin Street, then returning to Decatur Street before a dash to Capitol Avenue and finishing inside Center Parc Stadium.

== PNC 10 Miler ==
In 2011, an Atlanta Marathon was held in Atlantic Station with a marathon relay race part of the event. In 2013, a new 10-mile (16 km) race replaced the relay. On May 1, 2014, it was announced that the Atlanta Marathon would be dropped in favour of the ten-mile race and the five-kilometer race. Despite the cancellation of the Invesco Half Marathon and AJC Peachtree Road Race in 2020, the PNC 10 Miler was still held and renamed the PNC 10 Miler: Extreme Hill Edition, at Michelin Raceway, 50 miles (80 kilometres) from Atlantic Station, as a multiple-loop race with the shorter race cut to 2.54 miles for logistical reasons of conducting the event on a closed circuit.

=== Course ===
From 20th Street, the course proceeds to 16th Street, then to Northside Drive where it becomes Tech Parkway, then Luckie Street, followed to Baker Street. The course goes through the Georgia State Capitol, then Grant Park, then proceeds to Highland Avenue. The course follows through Virginia Avenue, then Piedmont Park, before heading through the Briarcliff area, then running down Lavista Road, Lindbergh Drive, and Peachtree Road before turning back to Atlantic Station for the finish. When the 10 Miler was added in 2013, the race started at Piedmont Park (16-mile point of the marathon course) and continued to the finish.

In 2018, the course was changed drastically. The start and finish are both locate in Atlantic Station, the course started on State Street, then proceeded to 18th Street and Peachtree Road, running north (instead of south), with major turns at Peachtree Hills, Lindbergh Drive, Piedmont Avenue, the Botanical Gardens, 12th Street, Juniper Street, Sixth Street, and going on West Peachtree Street (in the opposite direction of the Peachtree Road Race), before returning to 17th Street, State Street, and to Atlantic Station.

=== 2020 Michelin Raceway ===
Because of COVID-19 restrictions, the 2020 event was moved to Michelin Raceway and became a three-lap race known as the PNC Atlanta 10 Miler: Extreme Hills Edition because of the circuit's elevation changes. Runners started in multiple waves, and the circuit was marked with cones to separate the three laps. Runners started on pit lane and entered the course at pit exit, and ran the motorcycle layout. On the first two laps, runners turned right at Turn 5 instead of left, and entered the links that separate the circuit for driving schools. This section then turns left into the skid pad and driving school area. Runners then exited that section and rejoined the circuit from the driving school link past the exit of Turn 5 (about 1.16 miles of additional course) and continued on the car circuit. Once the runners passed the circuit's notorious Gravity Cavity section, they passed the downhill drop after the overpass and used the car Turn 12 on the first and second laps. On the third lap, runners ran the regular motorcycle variant through Turn 5 (skipping the driving school section) and ran the full layout before entering the motorcycle Turn 12. This motorcycle Turn 12 exit resulted in runners heading towards the finish line just past the start-finish line of the circuit.

== Controversies ==
The 2025 Atlanta Marathon course was measured after the race to be just short of 26.1 miles due to an error after last-minute course changes. As a result, the course was not certified and athletes could not use their times to qualify for certain races, like the Boston Marathon.

In 2026, the Atlanta Marathon hosted the USATF Half Marathon Championships. Within the last two miles of the race, the guide vehicle led the first three athletes off course, significantly altering the outcome of the race. USATF determined that the course was in violation of its rules, but that the results would stand.
