= Verification of employment =

Verification of Income and Employment (VOIE) is a process used by banks and mortgage lenders in the United States to review the employment history of a borrower, to determine the borrower's job stability and cross-reference income history with that stated on the Uniform Residential Loan Application (Form 1003). Lenders require complete VOE declaring all positions held for the last two years of employment history.

For mortgage the majority of the lenders are following Fannie Mae and Freddie Mac guidelines. Fannie Mae's guidelines are outlined in their Selling Guide, while Freddie Mac's requirements are detailed in their Servicer Guide. Both agencies aim to ensure borrowers have a reliable and sufficient income to support mortgage payments, thereby minimizing risk for lenders and investors. Most mortgages are preceded by both written and verbal VOEs.

There are multiple methods to verify employment available to the lenders.

== Instant databases ==
Instant databases for Verification of Income and Employment (VOIE) are usually compiled through a collaboration between credit bureaus (The Work Number from Equifax, Experian Verify) and payroll providers with employers. These databases aggregate vast amounts of employment and income data by integrating directly with payroll systems and other financial data sources.

== Consumer permissioned verification ==
Consumer-permissioned Verification of Income and Employment is an innovative approach in the mortgage lending process that empowers borrowers to directly authorize lenders to access their employment and income information. This method enhances transparency and security by giving consumers control over who can view their sensitive data. By using secure, digital platforms, borrowers can grant permission to lenders to retrieve their employment and income records instantly from payroll providers, financial institutions, or other data repositories.

This system not only speeds up the mortgage approval process but also ensures greater accuracy in the information provided, as it eliminates the potential for errors and fraud associated with manual documentation. Consumer-permissioned VOIE aligns with the requirements of Fannie Mae and Freddie Mac, ensuring that the data accessed meets the rigorous standards set by these entities. Additionally, this approach reduces the administrative burden on employers, who no longer need to manually respond to verification requests, and provides a seamless, user-friendly experience for borrowers (e.g. Plaid, Truv, Finicity), contributing to a more efficient and secure mortgage lending ecosystem.

== Manual verification ==
Once a lender receives the initial loan application, a Written Verification of Employment (Form 1005) is sent to all current and previous employers within the last two years listed on the application. This form is filled out by an authorized representative of the employer and includes dates of employment, positions held and a breakdown of compensation received. This information is compared to both the loan application and the income documentation, such as W2's to ensure the information is correct. Employers are not required by law to complete the VOE forms.

Once a mortgage has been approved and the borrowers have signed their mortgage documents, a Verbal Verification of Employment (Form 90) is conducted with all current employers prior to funding the loan. This is done to ensure that the borrower has not stopped working since the application was submitted, which would influence the terms on which the loan was approved.

VOE guidelines are different for self-employed borrowers, as a VOE should not be completed by the loan applicant. Self-employed borrowers are typically asked to provide either a current business license or, for borrowers who do not have a traditional business model, a letter from their Certified Public Accountant indicating that they have firsthand knowledge of their previous and continued employment as their tax preparer.
