= Galloping Gobbler =

The name Galloping Gobbler can refer to:

- The annual Turkey Trot in Fort Wayne, Indiana
- A most valuable player award given for NFL Thanksgiving games, see NFL on Thanksgiving Day#Game MVPs
