= Creve Coeur Airport =

- IATA: none; ICAO: none; FAA LID: 1H0

Summary
- Airport type: Public use
- Owner: Creve Coeur Airport Impr. Corp.
- Serves: St. Louis, Missouri
- Location: Maryland Heights, Missouri
- Elevation AMSL: 463 ft (141 m)
- Coordinates: 38°43′36″N 090°30′30″W
- Website: CreveCoeurAirport.com

Map
- Location of airport in Missouri / United States 1H0 (the United States)

Runways
Direction	Length		Surface
Direction	ft	m	Surface
16/34	4,500	1,372	Concrete
7/25	3,079	938	Turf

Statistics (2019)
- Aircraft operations: 60,476
- Based aircraft: 151
- Source: Federal Aviation Administration

Creve Coeur Airport (FAA LID: 1H0) is a public use airport in St. Louis County, Missouri, United States. It is four nautical miles (7 km) northwest of the central business district of Creve Coeur. The airport is located in the city of Maryland Heights and is named for Creve Coeur Lake.

This facility is included in the National Plan of Integrated Airport Systems, which categorized it as a general aviation reliever airport.

== History ==
The airport was established in 1958 when a pilot named Sid Coats purchased a farm owned by Norman "Ducks" Dauster.

Despite opposition from a city-county airport commission due to concerns about airspace conflicts with Lambert Field, in 1964 the airport was granted a five year permit as well as the right to expand to 204 acres (83 ha) by the county council. The permit was renewed in 1968.

The airport was purchased by John Cournoyer, John Mullen and Al Stix in 1983. To help pay for the airport, instead of renting hangars, the trio sold them.

The St. Louis Aviation Museum opened a temporary location at the airport in June 1986. By 1988, the Historic Aircraft Restoration Society and Museum had been organized at the airport. By mid December 1987, the unofficial name Dauster Field had been applied to the airport.

A proposal to build an airport adjacent to the nearby Arrowhead Airport was stymied due to its proximity to both that airport and Creve Coeur. One year later, a suggestion to convert a quarry across the river to a landfill caused concerns due the possibility of strikes from the birds it could attract. Due to questions from local residents, an application in 1991 to pave 600 feet (180 m) of the runway at the airport was remanded to a subcommittee by the city council for additional consideration.

Starting in 1993, the American Waco Club has held an annual fly-in at the airport. The same year, a flood completely submerged the field. However, all but 12 aircraft were able to be evacuated in advance.

By February 1995, the airport was considering lengthening the runway to 4,500 feet (1,400 m), which would necessitate the purchase of 145-acre (59 ha) acres of land.

The airport was at risk from floodwaters in June 2019. Subsequently, the airport's co-owner was one of several groups of people who expressed frustration that a pumping station to prevent flooding from rainwater impounded by the levees around the field had not been built. However, a plan to pay for the facility with TIF failed after a local commission voted against it. Completion of the pumping station was finally announced in January 2024.

== Facilities and aircraft ==
Creve Coeur Airport covers an area of 400 acres (162 ha) at an elevation of 463 feet (141 m) above mean sea level. It has two runways: 16/34 is 4,500 by 75 feet (1,372 x 23 m) with a concrete surface and 7/25 is 3,120 by 220 feet (951 x 67 m) with a turf surface.

The airport has a fixed-base operator that sells fuel. Services such as general maintenance and courtesy cars are available; there are also amenities such as internet, conference rooms, pilot supplies, and more.

For the 12-month period ending December 31, 2019, the airport had 60,476 aircraft operations, an average of 166 per day: 99.2% general aviation, 0.7% air taxi, and <0.1% military. At that time there were 118 aircraft based at this airport: 140 single-engine aircraft, 9 multi-engine aircraft, 1 jet aircraft, and 1 helicopter.

The airport is home to the Historic Aircraft Restoration Museum which has a large collection of airworthy vintage and veteran light aircraft types, mainly from the 1930s. The Gateway Chapter of the Army Aviation Heritage Foundation and Flying Museum is also located at the airport.

The St. Louis Flight of the Missouri Wing of the Civil Air Patrol meets at the airport. The airport is also home to the Gateway Youth Aeronautical Foundation.

== Accidents and incidents ==
- On 5 January 1986, a Piper Cherokee was destroyed when it suffered carburetor icing on takeoff and crashed into two parked airplanes.
- On 31 March 1986, a Skyote Aeromarine Skyote crashed after taking off from the airport, killing the pilot.
- On 7 July 1991, a Piper Cherokee made an emergency landing at the airport after being involved in a mid-air collision with two other aircraft near Quincy, Illinois.
- On September 28, 2002, a Jonas Nieuport executed a forced landing shortly after takeoff from the Creve Coeur airport. The pilot reported that, during the short flight, the engine cylinder head temperature began to rise and the engine began to lose power. The aircraft did not have enough altitude to return to the airport, so the pilot elected to make a precautionary landing in a dirt field. In the investigation it was found that that the carburetor jets were not the proper size for the engine, resulting in a lean mixture and hot engine. The probable cause of the accident was found to be the installation of improper carburetor jets resulting in an improper fuel mixture and loss of engine power.
- On July 11, 2004, an experimental Spiker Rotorway 162F helicopter rolled onto its side during an engine runup at the Creve Coeur airport. The student pilot onboard reported he was performing the runup to check the engine's engine and drive trained; however, he reported that the entire aircraft became airborne after he applied collective throttle. The pilot immediately lowered the collective to settle back to the ground, but the aircraft was already rolling left. The probable cause of the accident was found to be the inadvertent dynamic rollover of the helicopter after the helicopter became airborne during an engine run-up.
- On April 8, 2010, an American Champion Citabria crashed while performing touch-and-go landings on a training flight at the Creve Coeur airport. After several successful laps in the pattern, the instructor onboard pulled the carburetor heat and then set power to idle to simulate an engine failure. The student flying did not abort the attempted landing even when it became apparent that a safe landing was not possible; though the instructor called for and subsequently attempted a go-around, the airplane landed hard, damaging the landing gear and the right wingtip. The probable cause of the accident was found to be the pilot's failure to go-around during a simulated engine failure and the instructor pilot's delay in remedial actions.
- On 26 June 2014, a twin-engine Cessna crashed while landing at the airport and burned, injuring the pilot.

== See also ==
- List of airports in Missouri
