= Begor =

Begor is a surname. Notable people with the surname include:

- Fay B. Begor (1916–1943), American physician and U.S. Navy veteran
- Mark Begor (born c. 1959), American business executive
