= Maryland Heights, Missouri =

- City
- City of Maryland Heights
- Motto: Where Life is Celebrated
- Location of Maryland Heights, Missouri
- Coordinates: 38°43′08″N 90°28′30″W
- Country: United States
- State: Missouri
- County: St. Louis

Government
  - Mayor: Mike Moeller

Area
  - Total: 23.41 sq mi (60.62 km^{2})
  - Land: 21.88 sq mi (56.67 km^{2})
  - Water: 1.53 sq mi (3.95 km^{2})
- Elevation: 505 ft (154 m)

Population (2020)
  - Total: 28,284
  - Density: 1,292.6/sq mi (499.09/km^{2})
- Time zone: UTC−6 (Central (CST))
  - Summer (DST): UTC−5 (CDT)
- ZIP code: 63043
- Area code: 314
- FIPS code: 29-46586
- GNIS feature ID: 2395034
- Website: www.marylandheights.com

Maryland Heights is a second-ring west-northwest suburb of St. Louis, located in St. Louis County, Missouri, United States. As of the 2020 census, Maryland Heights had a population of 28,284. The city was incorporated in 1985. Edwin L. Dirck was appointed the city's first mayor by then County Executive Gene McNary. Mark M. Levin served as City Administrator from August 1985 to 2015.

== Geography ==
According to the United States Census Bureau, the city has a total area of 23.35 square miles (60.48 km^{2}), of which 21.83 square miles (56.54 km^{2}) is land and 1.52 square miles (3.94 km^{2}) is water.

== Government ==
The City of Maryland Heights is a third-class statutory city. It is governed by a mayor who serves a four-year term and a city council made up of eight members. The city is divided into four wards. Two council-people are elected from each ward to serve on a city council for two-year terms. The city has offered internships in public administration since 1986.

== Demographics ==
Historical population
Census	Pop.	Note	%±
1970	8,805		—
1980	5,676		−35.5%
1990	25,407		347.6%
2000	25,756		1.4%
2010	27,472		6.7%
2020	28,284		3.0%

=== Racial and ethnic composition ===
Maryland Heights city, Missouri – Racial and ethnic composition Note: the US Census treats Hispanic/Latino as an ethnic category. This table excludes Latinos from the racial categories and assigns them to a separate category. Hispanics/Latinos may be of any race.
Race / Ethnicity (NH = Non-Hispanic)	Pop 2000	Pop 2010	Pop 2020	% 2000	% 2010	% 2020
White alone (NH)	21,593	19,613	16,318	83.84%	71.39%	57.69%
Black or African American alone (NH)	1,419	3,244	4,314	5.51%	11.81%	15.25%
Native American or Alaska Native alone (NH)	42	55	66	0.16%	0.20%	0.23%
Asian alone (NH)	1,830	2,689	4,629	7.11%	9.79%	16.37%
Native Hawaiian or Pacific Islander alone (NH)	8	13	18	0.03%	0.05%	0.06%
Other race alone (NH)	23	49	262	0.09%	0.18%	0.93%
Mixed race or Multiracial (NH)	242	576	1,313	0.94%	2.10%	4.64%
Hispanic or Latino (any race)	599	1,233	1,364	2.33%	4.49%	4.82%
Total	25,756	27,472	28,284	100.00%	100.00%	100.00%

=== 2020 census ===
As of the 2020 census, Maryland Heights had a population of 28,284, with 12,519 households and 6,837 families.

The median age was 35.8 years. 19.6% of residents were under the age of 18 and 15.0% were 65 years of age or older. For every 100 females there were 95.6 males, and for every 100 females age 18 and over there were 93.4 males age 18 and over.

100.0% of residents lived in urban areas, while 0.0% lived in rural areas.

Of the 12,519 households, 26.8% had children under the age of 18 living in them. Of all households, 40.5% were married-couple households, 22.8% were households with a male householder and no spouse or partner present, and 29.8% were households with a female householder and no spouse or partner present. About 34.9% of all households were made up of individuals, 9.7% had someone living alone who was 65 years of age or older, and the average household and family sizes were 2.2 and 2.9, respectively.

There were 13,425 housing units, of which 6.7% were vacant. The homeowner vacancy rate was 1.3% and the rental vacancy rate was 9.7%.

Racial composition as of the 2020 census
Race	Number	Percent
White	16,555	58.5%
Black or African American	4,353	15.4%
American Indian and Alaska Native	102	0.4%
Asian	4,639	16.4%
Native Hawaiian and Other Pacific Islander	18	0.1%
Some other race	778	2.8%
Two or more races	1,839	6.5%
Hispanic or Latino (of any race)	1,364	4.8%

=== 2016–2020 American Community Survey ===
The 2016–2020 5-year American Community Survey estimates show that the median household income was $69,973 (with a margin of error of +/- $5,915) and the median family income was $89,805 (+/- $5,758). Males had a median income of $52,628 (+/- $5,975) versus $40,204 (+/- $5,230) for females. The median income for those above 16 years old was $44,604 (+/- $4,916). Approximately, 5.1% of families and 7.4% of the population were below the poverty line, including 8.3% of those under the age of 18 and 4.9% of those ages 65 or over.

=== 2010 census ===
As of the census of 2010, there were 27,472 people, 12,180 households, and 6,766 families living in the city. The population density was 1,258.5 inhabitants per square mile (485.9/km^{2}). There were 13,092 housing units at an average density of 599.7 per square mile (231.5/km^{2}). The racial makeup of the city was 63.2% White, 21.9% African American, 0.2% Native American, 9.8% Asian, 2.3% from other races, and 2.5% from two or more races. Hispanic or Latino of any race were 4.5% of the population.

There were 12,180 households, of which 27.5% had children under the age of 18 living with them, 39.9% were married couples living together, 11.4% had a female householder with no husband present, 4.2% had a male householder with no wife present, and 44.4% were non-families. 35.2% of all households were made up of individuals, and 7.2% had someone living alone who was 65 years of age or older. The average household size was 2.21 and the average family size was 2.90.

The median age in the city was 35 years. 20.3% of residents were under the age of 18; 10.8% were between the ages of 18 and 24; 32% were from 25 to 44; 24.8% were from 45 to 64; and 12.2% were 65 years of age or older. The gender makeup of the city was 48.7% male and 51.3% female.

=== 2000 census ===
As of the census of 2000, there were 25,756 people, 11,302 households, and 6,419 families living in the city. The population density was 1,204.4 inhabitants per square mile (465.0/km^{2}). There were 11,846 housing units at an average density of 553.9 per square mile (213.9/km^{2}). The racial makeup of the city was 85.35% White, 5.58% African American, 0.20% Native American, 7.11% Asian, 0.03% Pacific Islander, 0.71% from other races, and 1.02% from two or more races. Hispanic or Latino of any race were 2.33% of the population.

There were 11,302 households, out of which 25.8% had children under the age of 18 living with them, 44.2% were married couples living together, 9.5% had a female householder with no husband present, and 43.2% were non-families. 33.8% of all households were made up of individuals, and 5.5% had someone living alone who was 65 years of age or older. The average household size was 2.25 and the average family size was 2.94.

In the city, the population was spread out, with 21.5% under the age of 18, 9.8% from 18 to 24, 37.2% from 25 to 44, 22.0% from 45 to 64, and 9.5% who were 65 years of age or older. The median age was 34 years. For every 100 females, there were 97.7 males. For every 100 females age 18 and over, there were 96.1 males.

The median income for a household in the city was $48,689, and the median income for a family was $58,487. Males had a median income of $40,700 versus $30,613 for females. The per capita income for the city was $24,918. About 3.8% of families and 5.3% of the population were below the poverty line, including 4.6% of those under age 18 and 8.2% of those age 65 or over.

== Education ==
Maryland Heights is served by Parkway and Pattonville public school districts.

Both school districts have earned "Distinction in Performance" recognition from the Missouri Department of Education.

== Healthcare ==
SSM Health DePaul Hospital, a 478-bed, full-service hospital, is located nearby in Bridgeton.

== Economy ==
Edward Jones Investments operates its North Campus office in Maryland Heights.

At one time, Express Scripts had its headquarters in Maryland Heights. Express Scripts built a new headquarters on the grounds of the University of Missouri-St. Louis in 2007.

Central Midland Railway (CMR), a division of Progressive Rail Inc. of Minnesota, provides regular freight rail service to several businesses located in Maryland Heights. CMR operates the far eastern segment of the former Chicago, Rock Island and Pacific Railway's St. Louis to Kansas City main line that was constructed in 1870. The active portion of the former CRI&P line runs from the north side of St. Louis, where it connects with the Terminal Railroad Association of St. Louis and Union Pacific Railroad, and now terminates in Union.

Hollywood Casino St. Louis is on the western edge of the city.

World Wide Technology is based in Maryland Heights.

Bayer Crop Science has a campus in nearby Creve Coeur.

=== Top employers ===
According to the city's 2022 Annual Comprehensive Financial Report, the top employers in the city are:

#	Employer	# of Employees
1	Spectrum Mid West LLC	2,119
2	World Wide Technology	1,432
3	Edward Jones	1,418
4	Magellan Health Services	1,350
5	Hollywood Casino St. Louis	933
6	UnitedHealth Group#UnitedHealthcare	900
7	Graybar Electric Company, Inc.	690
8	Schnucks Markets	627
9	Equifax Workforce Solutions	570
10	Ranken Jordan Pediatric Bridge Hospital	500

== Attractions, parks and recreation ==
The city of Maryland Heights operates four parks as well as Aquaport, a waterpark; Sportport, a multi-use recreational facility; and Dogport, a park for dogs.

=== Aquaport ===
Aquaport is operated by Maryland Heights as a municipal water park for citizens of Maryland Heights and Creve Coeur. It opened in 1999.

=== Centene Community Ice Center ===
The Centene Community Ice Center, which opened in 2019, features three indoor ice rinks and a covered outdoor rinks. It is a practice facility for the St. Louis Blues, as well as home ice for Lindenwood University's men's and women's ice hockey teams.

=== Creve Coeur County Park ===
Creve Coeur Lake Memorial Park is operated by St. Louis County and was a summer resort in the early 1900s. It features a 320-acre (1.3 km^{2}) lake as well as the picturesque "Dripping Springs" waterfall. It was St. Louis County's first park.

=== Historic Aircraft Restoration Museum ===
Historic Aircraft Restoration Museum is located at the Creve Coeur Airport and has a large collection of 1920s and 1930s aircraft.

=== Vago Community Park ===
Vago Park is a 20-acre (81,000 m^{2}) park located at the intersection of Fee Fee Road and Midland Avenue. It features three playgrounds, a splash pad play area, a paved walking trail, a sand volleyball court, three pavilions, a gazebo and picnic areas outfitted with barbecue grills. Visitors will want to be sure to note the "Veterans Memorial Walk," a sidewalk made of bricks imprinted with the names of Maryland Heights residents who have served in the Armed Forces of the United States.

=== Gerald A. Eise Memorial Park ===
Eise Park is located at the intersection of Glenview Drive and Bourbon Street, near Rose Acres Elementary School. It contains one pavilion seating about 25 people, a playground, a splash pad play area, several picnic tables with barbecue grills, a walking path, a basketball slab, and restrooms.

=== Quiet Hollow Park ===
Quiet Hollow Park is a small park at the intersection of Marine Avenue and McKelvey Road.

=== Parkwood Park ===
Parkwood Park is located on 3145 Parkwood Lane, next to Parkwood Elementary School. It features a 0.7-mile (1.1 km) paved walking trail with fitness stations, a playground, green space, restrooms and a small parking lot.

=== Westport Plaza ===
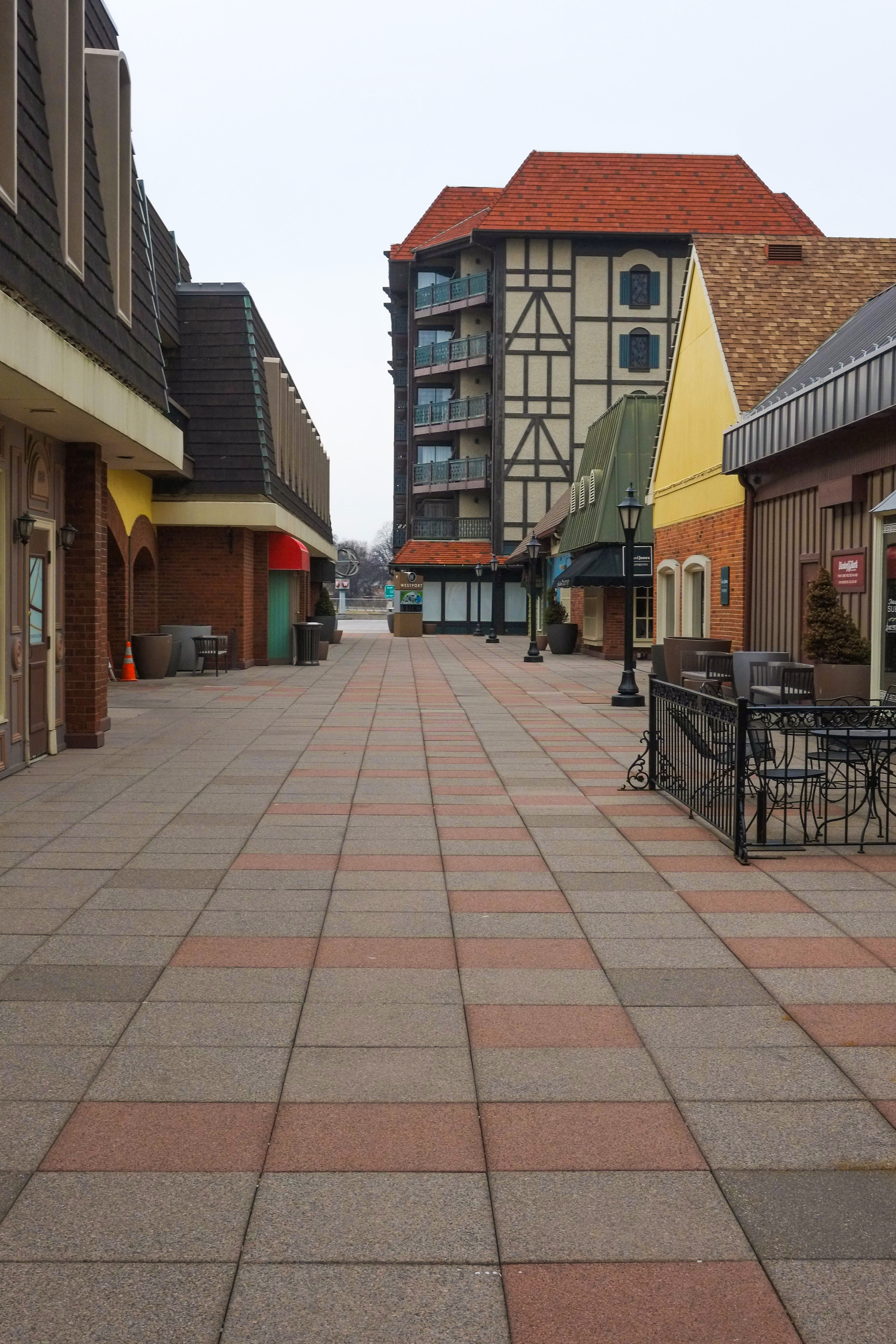
Westport Plaza

Westport Plaza is a 700,000+ square foot development featuring dining, entertainment venues, businesses and radio stations. Westport is located at the intersection of Page Avenue and I-270 in the northwest area of St. Louis County.

=== Hollywood Casino ===
Maryland Heights is home to St. Louis County's first casino, Hollywood Casino St. Louis, which opened in 1997 in the Riverport area as Harrah's.

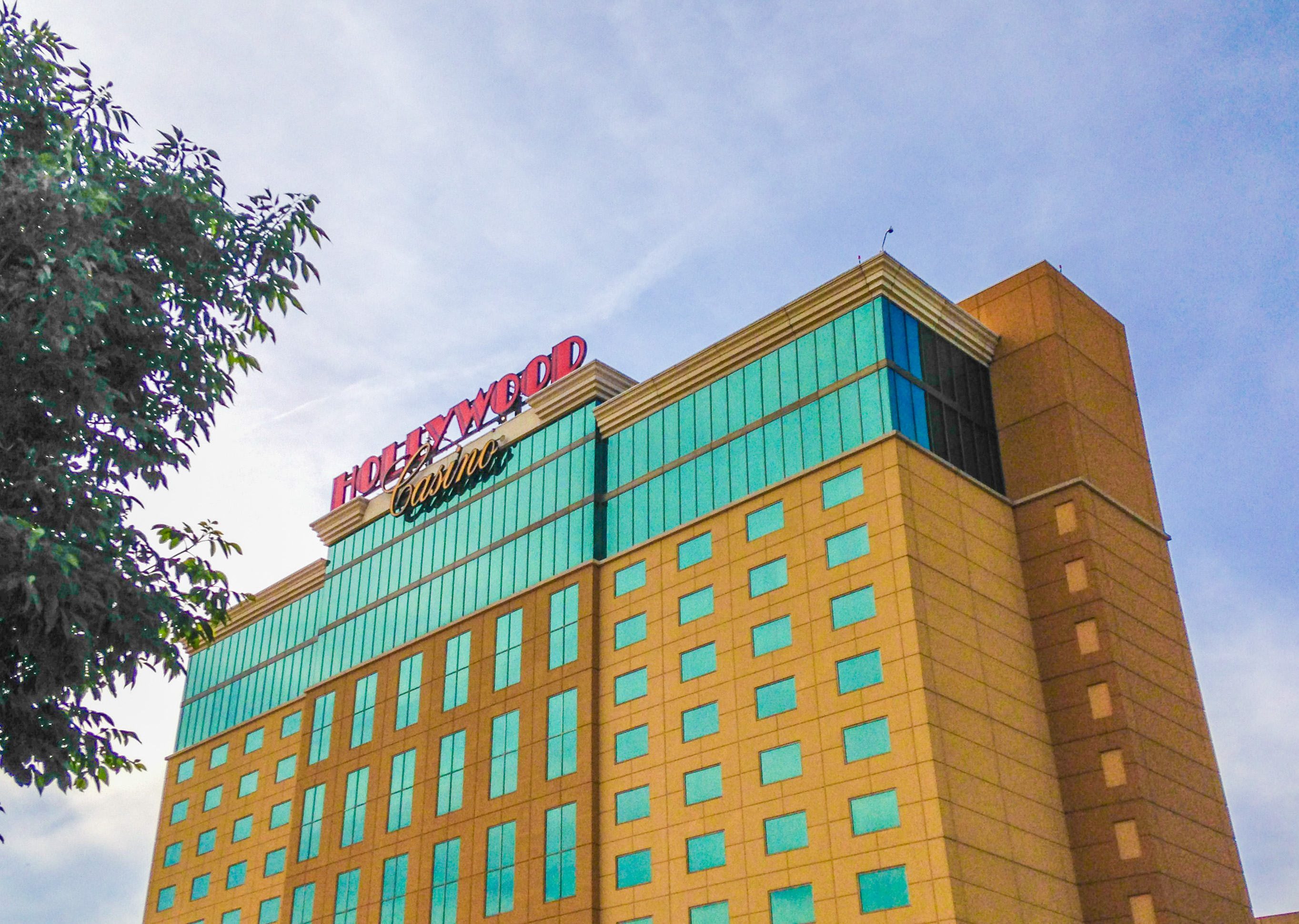
Hollywood Casino St. Louis

=== Hollywood Casino Amphitheater ===
The Hollywood Casino Amphitheater is a 7,000-seat outdoor concert venue, with lawn seating for another 13,000, making it a 20,000 person capacity venue.

=== Zion Lutheran Church ===
Zion Lutheran Church is one of the earliest parts of the community which became Maryland Heights. It started as a grade school on October 13, 1869, and it became a congregation of the Lutheran Church–Missouri Synod on January 1, 1883.
