= Dallas Turkey Trot =

Annual footrace held in Dallas, U.S.

- Date: Thanksgiving Day
- Location: Dallas, Texas
- Event type: Road
- Distance: 8.2 miles; 5K fun run
- Beneficiary: YMCA of Metropolitan Dallas
- Established: 1967 59 years ago
- Website: www.ymcadallas.org/turkeytrot

The Dallas Turkey Trot (commonly branded the Dallas YMCA Turkey Trot after its chief beneficiary) is an annual turkey trot footrace over an 8.2 miles (13.2 km) course through the city of Dallas, Texas (USA). There is also a 5k fun run/walk. Participants may choose to register for the 5k as a timed or untimed runner.

Between both events, the Dallas Turkey Trot is one of the largest multi-event races in the United States. The race attracts more than 25,000 harriers per year, with a record high of 36,820 in 2011. That year, the Turkey Trot set the Guinness World Record for the largest gathering of people dressed as turkeys, with 661 participants.

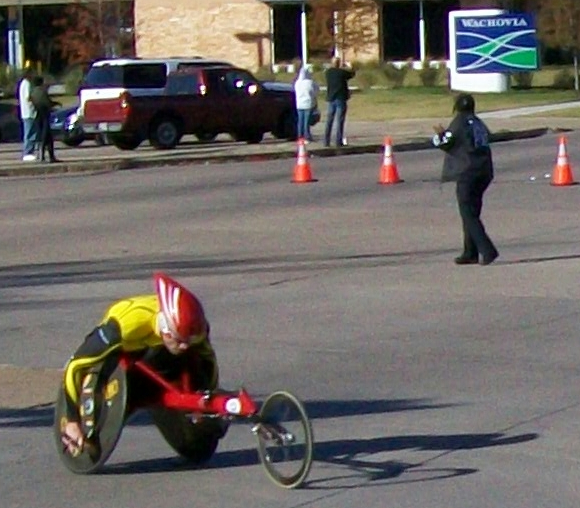
Justin Meaders, 2009 wheelchair race winner

The race includes both runners and wheelchair racers.

== History ==
The original Turkey Trot began in the 1940s and was run at Fair Park in Dallas. The 8-mile (13 km) began running annually in 1968, with 107 runners being instructed to start from the Bath House Cultural Center at White Rock Lake and run along the lake "to the big oaktree and back." However, the course was actually 8.2 miles (13.2 km). Ralph Trimble won the event in a time of 41:59, and Nancy Norvell was the winner on the women's side in 54:40.

The race quickly rose in popularity, and in 1979, The Trot was moved to the downtown area, near Dallas City Hall. The 3-mile (4.8 km) Fun Run was added in 1984 in order to accommodate the increased participation of children and families.

== The course ==
The race begins next to City Hall and heads east into Deep Ellum. After two left turns, the course then heads west back into downtown down Elm Street. At Griffin Street, the 5k participants turn left and finish the race back at City Hall.

Still on Elm Street, the eight mile runners pass by the Bank of America Plaza. Elm turns into Houston Street, passing Dealey Plaza. The course then winds around site of the former Reunion Arena and onto the Houston Street Viaduct for almost two miles (3 km), passing over the Trinity River.

After a turn around on Zang Boulevard in Oak Cliff, the race moves on the Jefferson St. Viaduct, "The Mile Long Bridge" parallel to the Houston Strett Viaduct. On Jefferson, runners can see the beautiful Dallas skyline as they reenter Downtown. A quick turn east on Young Street then a slant onto Marrilla terminates the race right next to City Hall.

== Trivia ==
- Winningest Runners:
  - Male: Ben Moturi (4 times between 1981-84)
  - Female: Ingrid Mollenkopf (5 times: 2014-2017, 2019)
- Notable Winners
  - 1976: Jeff Wells, who finished second place in the 1978 Boston Marathon

== See also ==
- Buffalo Turkey Trot, another YMCA-sponsored Turkey Trot
