= Feaster Five Road Race =

- Date: Thanksgiving Day
- Location: Andover, Massachusetts, United States
- Event type: Road
- Distance: 5 miles (8K certified) and 5 kilometers (3.1 mi)
- Primary sponsor: Merrimack Valley Striders
- Beneficiary: The Merrimack Valley YMCA, Bellesini Academy, Challenge Unlimited at Ironstone Farm, Merrimack Valley Striders, and Groundwork Lawrence
- Established: November 24, 1988
- Website: feasterfive.com
- Participants: 10,720 (in 2012)

The Feaster Five Thanksgiving Day Road Race, more commonly called the Feaster Five, is a 5-mile road race held annually in Andover, Massachusetts, United States, on the fourth Thursday in November, Thanksgiving Day. It is one of the state's largest five mile races (with an estimated 10,720 participants in 2012). The race has been held every Thanksgiving morning since 1988, and is one of a number of races across the nation known colloquially as a "Turkey Trot."

Proceeds from the race benefit Merrimack Valley Striders Scholarship Program, the Bellesini Academy, Groundworks Lawrence and the Merrimack Valley YMCA.

Children ages 2–12 can participate in a shorter, one-kilometer race called The Kids' K.

== History ==
=== 1980s ===
On November 24, 1988 the first Feaster Five was held, and approximately 300 runners finished. The first men's winner was Ken Pliska, and Amy Legacki was the first women's winner.

The second race in 1989 almost did not happen because of an early nor'easter that deposited more than six inches of heavy wet snow on the course at the start of the race. Approximately 400 runners completed the race in near whiteout conditions. In 1990, apple pies were given out to all runners, a tradition that continues every year.

=== 1990s ===
In 1992, Johnny Kelley appeared as an honored guest at the start of the race. This was the first year that walkers were officially allowed into the race. In 1996, Lynn Jennings, the winner of the bronze medal in the 1992 Summer Olympics for the 10,000 meters, placed first in the women's division.

=== 2000s ===
In 2000, FRID timing was used for the first time to obtain a more accurate time for each runner.

In 2004, actor Matt Damon ran the race along with his father Kent.

In 2005, women participants outnumbered men for the first time. In 2009, more than 9,147 runners and walkers registered for the race, and the first ever women's Olympic marathon champion Joan Benoit Samuelson won first place in the woman's division at the age of 52.

=== 2010s ===
In 2011, Senator Scott Brown officially started the 24th Feaster Five Road Race.

Just before the start of the 2015 race, a small drone hit a tree branch near the start of the race and crashed into the crowd. Its rotors injured two runners with small lacerations.

The 2017 race was the 30th anniversary, and the first 9,000 entrants were guaranteed a hoodie-style race shirt. The youngest runner was one year old, and the oldest was 93, with a total of 9,966 total entrants. Ruben Senca won the five-mile race for the fifth time.

Due to record-setting cold weather, the 2018 race organizers were forced to cancel the five-mile race and the kids' run, leaving only run the five-kilometer race for all participants. Of the 8,500 registered runners, nearly 4,000 took part in the race. The 2018 race raised more than $75,000 for the five charitable partners.

=== 2020s ===
A virtual race was held in November 2020 because of the COVID-19 pandemic. Live races will resume in 2021.

== Course description ==
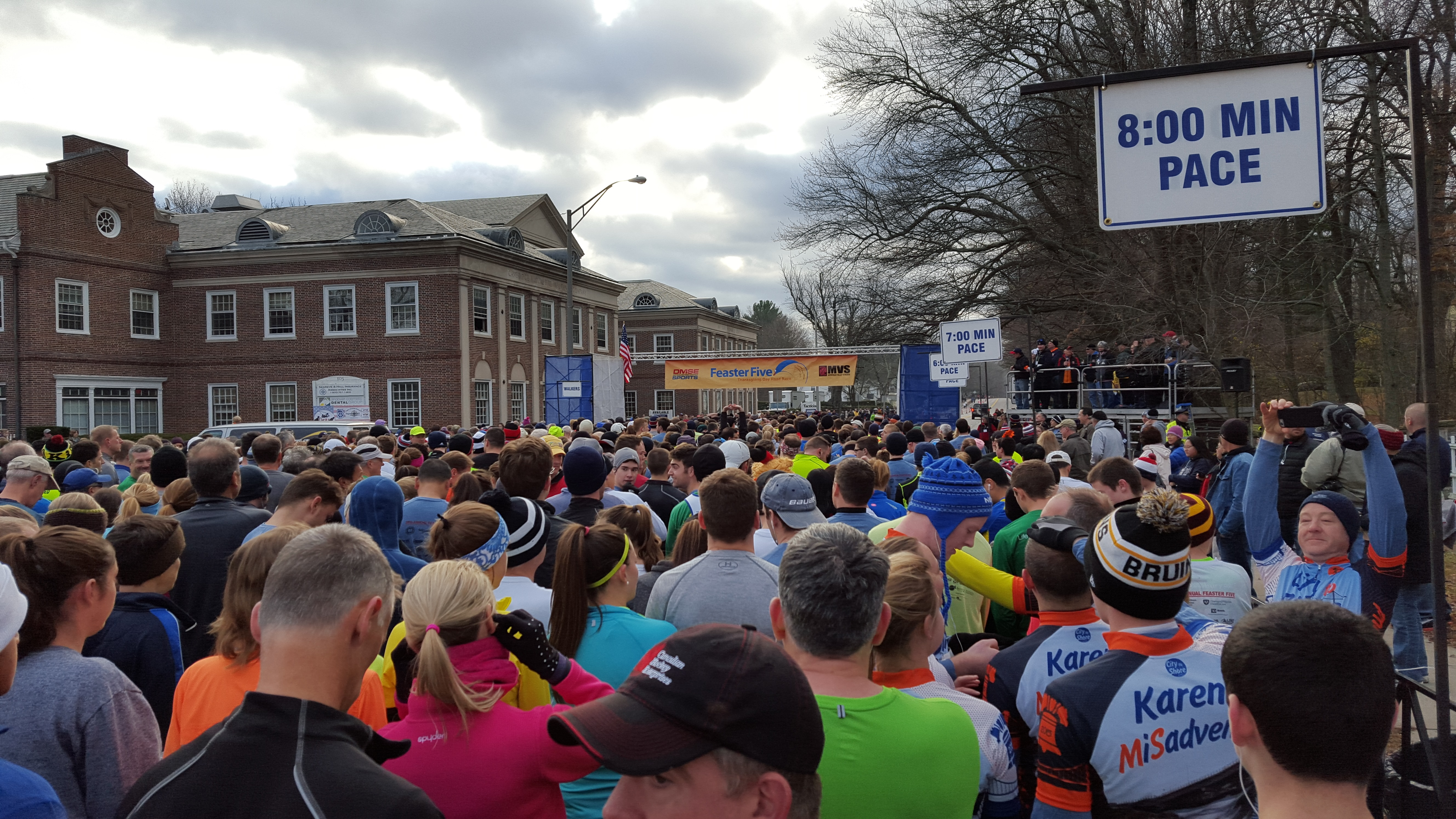
The Feaster Five starting line in Andover, Massachusetts in 2015

=== 8-kilometer course ===
The 8-kilometer race begins on Main Street at the intersection of Route 28 and Route 133. The first mile is mostly uphill and goes through the historic Andover Center. The course then turns left of Morton Street, left on Bartlett Street, and then a right onto Chestnut Street. It then makes a left onto Pasho Street. a right onto Summer Street, a left onto Washington Street, a left onto Elm Street, a right on Maple Street, and then a quick left turn on Walnut Avenue. When the runner take a right onto High Street they join up with the runners from the 5-kilometer race. The 8-kilometer runners keep to the right side of the street while the 5-kilometer runners keep to the left. The race then proceeds to a left on Haverhill Street for approximately 1/2 mile, then makes a right turn on York Street and uphill to the finish at the Brickstone Square parking lot. There are typically stands in the Brickstone Square parking lot giving food and drinks to the runners, including apple pie.

=== 5-kilometer course ===
The 5-kilometer race begins at the same time and place as the 8-kilometer race, but takes a left turn at the top of the hill on Elm Street. The runners then make a left turn onto High Street and later merge with the runners from the 8-kilometer race at the corner of High and Walnut Streets. The race then proceeds to a left on Haverhill Street for approximately 1/2 mile, then makes a right turn on York Street and uphill to the finish at the Brickstone Square parking lot.

== Past winners ==
=== 5-kilometer ===
| Year | Male winner | | | Female winner | | |
|---|---|---|---|---|---|---|
| 1995 | Michael Cronin | United States | 16:41 | Mary Donahue | United States | 18:20 |
| 1996 | Guy Sterns | United States | 15:51 | Kara Molloy | United States | 19:23 |
| 1997 | Dan Leboeuf | United States | 16:42 | Jennifer Lincoln | United States | 18:30 |
| 1998 | Matthew Ely | United States | 16:12 | Jennifer Lincoln-Toomey | United States | 17:44 (course record) |
| 1999 | Matt St. Germaine | United States | 15:44 | Kara Molloy | United States | 18:43 |
| 2000 | Matthew Ely | United States | 15:55 | Courtney Famiglietti | United States | 20:07 |
| 2001 | Doug Martyn | United States | 16:13 | Jessica Parrott | United States | 18:52 |
| 2002 | Tim Galebach | United States | 16:18 | Miae Jacobs | United States | 19:02 |
| 2003 | Matthew Ely | United States | 16:14 | Melissa Donais | United States | 19:03 |
| 2004 | Phil Shaw | United States | 16:18 | Melissa Donais | United States | 19:04 |
| 2005 | Harry Norton | United States | 16:16 | Meaghan Shaw | United States | 19:09 |
| 2006 | Harry Norton | United States | 15:52 | Katie Twarog | United States | 18:46 |
| 2007 | Harry Norton | United States | 15:40 | Allison McCabe | United States | 18:04 |
| 2008 | Glenn Randall | United States | 15:57 | Allison McCabe | United States | 18:34 |
| 2009 | Eric Narcisi | United States | 16:31 | Allison McCabe | United States | 18:11 |
| 2010 | Kevin Alliette | United States | 16:00 | Allison McCabe | United States | 18:57 |
| 2011 | Kyle White | United States | 17:45 | Melissa Donais | United States | 19:36 |
| 2012 | Pat Fullerton | United States | 15:46 | Allison McCabe | United States | 17:56 |
| 2013 | Pat Fullerton | United States | 15:08 (course record) | Alanna McDonough | United States | 19:16 |
| 2014 | Mike Carleone | United States | 16:04 | Anna Willard | United States | 18:26 |
| 2015 | Eric McDonald | United States | 16:15 | Christina Supino | United States | 18:37 |
| 2016 | Neal Darmody | United States | 15:37 | Allison McCabe | United States | 18:32 |
| 2017 | Neal Darmody and Jacob Johns (Tie) | United States | 15:57 | Alanna McDonough | United States | 19:00 |
| 2018 | Neal Darmody | United States | 15:45 | Catherine Beck | United States | 18:37 |

=== 5-kilometer wheelchair ===
| Year | Male winner | | | Female winner | | |
|---|---|---|---|---|---|---|
| 2017 | Brian Gauthier | United States | 24:26 | Katie Adie | United States | 34:06 |

=== 8-kilometer ===
| Year | Male winner | | | Female winner | | |
|---|---|---|---|---|---|---|
| 1988 | Ken Pliska | United States | Unknown | Amy Legacki | United States | Unknown |
| 1989 | Unknown | United States | Unknown | Unknown | United States | Unknown |
| 1990 | Unknown | United States | Unknown | Unknown | United States | Unknown |
| 1991 | Unknown | United States | Unknown | Unknown | United States | Unknown |
| 1992 | Unknown | United States | Unknown | Unknown | United States | Unknown |
| 1993 | Scott Bagley | United States | 24:07 | Gina Sperry | United States | 28:04 |
| 1994 | George Yiannelis | United States | 24:18 | Lisa Senatore | United States | 28:04 |
| 1995 | George Yiannelis | United States | 24:07 | Joan Samuelson | United States | 27:39 |
| 1996 | Dave Dunham | United States | 24:38 | Lynn Jennings | United States | 27:33 |
| 1997 | Chris Teague | United States | 25:00 | Lynn Jennings | United States | 28:08 |
| 1998 | Chris Teague | United States | 24:18 | Terri-Anne McGettrick | United States | 28:44 |
| 1999 | Dave Hinga | United States | 24:04 (course record) | Terri-Anne McGettrick | United States | 28:21 |
| 2000 | Chris Teague | United States | 25:01 | Terri-Anne McGettrick | United States | 29:41 |
| 2001 | Michael Smith | United States | 24:56 | Suzy Walsh | United States | 29:29 |
| 2002 | Dave Hinga | United States | 25:19 | Kara Haas | United States | 29:33 |
| 2003 | Casey Moulton | United States | 24:40 | Terri-Anne McGettrick | United States | 28:40 |
| 2004 | Dave Hinga | United States | 25:42 | Simonetta Piergentili | United States | 30:09 |
| 2005 | Matt Pimental | United States | 25:55 | Terri-Anne McGettrick | United States | 30:38 |
| 2006 | Patrick Moulton | United States | 25:15 | Terri-Anne McGettrick Arpin | United States | 30:07 |
| 2007 | Tobias Lundgren | Sweden | 25:27 | Kim Webster | United States | 29:31 |
| 2008 | Harry Norton | United States | 25:24 | Kim Webster | United States | 29:52 |
| 2009 | Nate Jenkins | United States | 24:44 | Joan Samuelson | United States | 30:10 |
| 2010 | Nate Jenkins | United States | 24:10 | Catherine Beck | United States | 29:44 |
| 2011 | Nate Jenkins | United States | 24:25 | Joan Samuelson | United States | 30:21 |
| 2012 | Nate Jenkins | United States | 24:43 | Catherine Beck | United States | 28:10 |
| 2013 | Ruben Sanca | Cape Verde | 24:19 | Kirsten Kasper | United States | 27:48 |
| 2014 | Ruben Sanca | Cape Verde | 25:13 | Catherine Beck | United States | 29:20 |
| 2015 | Ruben Sanca | Cape Verde | 24:34 | Catherine Beck | United States | 29:08 |
| 2016 | Ruben Sanca | Cape Verde | 24:44 | Danielle Poto | United States | 30:19 |
| 2017 | Ruben Sanca | Cape Verde | 24:43 | Maggie Mullins | United States | 29:13 |
| 2018 | Race cancelled | NA | NA | Race Cancelled | NA | NA |
