= Westport Plaza =

Resort and entertainment center in Maryland Heights, Missouri

Coordinates: 38°42′06″N 90°26′50″W

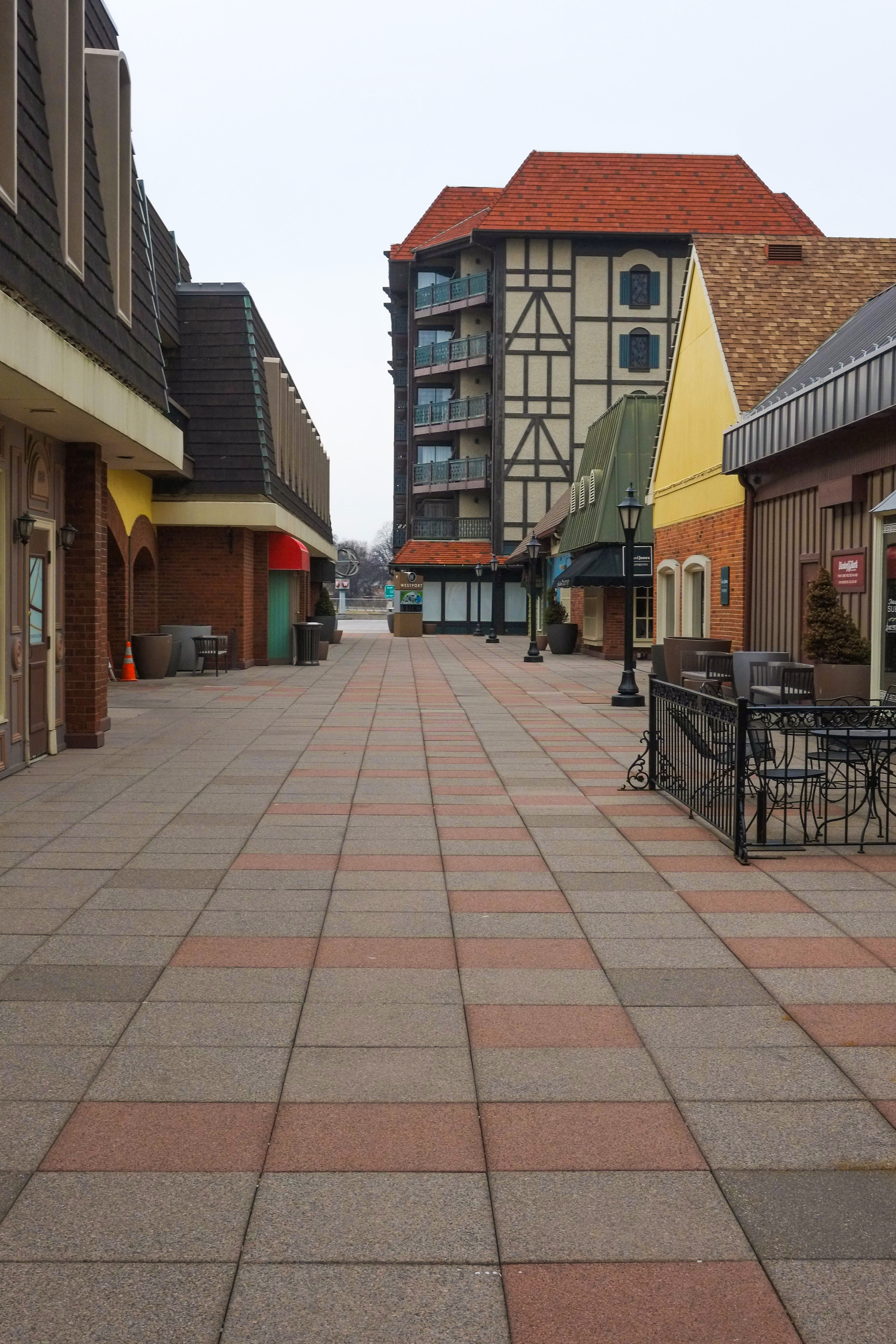
View of Westport Plaza, March 2018

Westport Plaza is a 42-acre (170,000 m^{2}), commercial development, resort, and entertainment center located in Maryland Heights, Missouri.

== History ==
Westport was built by a prominent St. Louis developer, Thomas J. White, and opened in 1973. Westport since has grown to over 700,000 square feet (65,000 m^{2}) of office buildings, restaurants, entertainment venues, and hotels.

The property was purchased jointly in 2007 by real estate company Golub & Co. and Boston-based Intercontinental Real Estate Corp.

In 2012, Westport Plaza was purchased by Lodging Hospitality Management. The entertainment complex hosts many popular events over the year including the St. Louis Beer and Brat Festival, lunchtime concerts, "Parties at the Plaza" events, jazz concerts and Archon 34.

The plaza underwent a major renovation in 2023-2024 with the construction of an open green space and large television as part of Rawlings (company) building The Rawlings Experience at the site.

== Restaurants and Entertainment Venues ==
- The Rawlings (company) Experience- A baseball museum and store with unique memorabilia and customization experiences.
- 360 Westport- A rooftop bar and restaurant with views of the West St. Louis County
- Soda Fountain Express- Fast Casual dining experience with a Retro-diner theme.
- Basso on the Plaza- Modern Italian Bistro mirroring its sister restaurant at the Cheshire Hotel
- Backstreet Jazz & Blues- Jazz club featuring live music at night.
- Drunken Fish- Sushi Lounge with live music and karaoke at night.
- Funny Bone- Popular St. Louis comedy club.
- Kobe Steakhouse- Japanese, Teppanyaki-style restaurant provides entertaining dining.
- Trainwreck Saloon- American style restaurant and bar, live music and dancing at night.
- Westport Social- Bar that has a classic bar feel and incredible gaming lounge.
- Westport also has fast-food chains of Starbucks and McDonald's

== Theater ==
- Westport Playhouse is a 240-seat theater with Broadway & off-Broadway shows, Concert Series, Speaker Series, Local Showcases, One-Person Shows, Dance performances, Private Events and Rentals and the a small cafe, snack bar, and gift shop. The Playhouse has a long history starting in the 1970s with many artists having performed there over the years including Steppenwolf, Toto, News Kids on the Block, Donny Osmond, David Allan Coe, Cheap Trick, Joan Jett and many others.
- The Playhouse is now operated by Lotown Media, LLC, based in St. Louis, Missouri, and is in the process of re-opening after a two-year hiatus.

== Hotels ==
- Sheraton Westport Plaza
- Sheraton Lakeside Chalet Resort

== Media ==
- Studios of KTRS (AM)

== Large Companies ==
- Paric
- World Wide Technology
- Aclara
- Rawlings (company) Headquarters

== Transportation ==
Westport is located on Westport Plaza Drive with easy connections to Page Avenue near the I-270 and Page Avenue interchange in Maryland Heights. Metro operates bus routes in the Westport Plaza area. Future plans to extend the MetroLink lightrail west from Clayton include a station at Westport.
