= Veda (company) =

Veda Advantage Limited
- Formerly: Baycorp Advantage
- Type: Public
- Traded as: ASX: VED
- Founded: 1967
- Headquarters: Sydney
- Products: Business Services
- Parent: Equifax
- Website: www.veda.com.au

Veda Advantage Limited (commonly known as Veda; formerly Baycorp Advantage) was a credit reference agency in Australia and New Zealand. The company provided credit reporting, credit scoring, and marketing analytics services. The company was acquired by Equifax in 2016.

The company was the product of a merger of the Australian company Data Advantage and the New Zealand company Baycorp in 2001. The change to the name Veda was prompted by the sale of Baycorp Collection Services, which retained the Baycorp name.

== History ==
Veda traces its origin to 1967, when a credit reference association was established in New South Wales.

In 2001, Data Advantage merged with Baycorp to form Baycorp Advantage. The company was rebranded as Veda Advantage in 2007 and later adopted the shortened name Veda.

By 2010, Veda accounted for more than 85% of the credit reference market in Australia and by 2015 it maintained records on more than 16 million Australians.

In February 2016, Veda was acquired by Equifax for a total consideration of $1.9 billion.

== Business and products ==
Veda provided consumer credit reports, credit scores, business credit checks, fraud-prevention tools, and data analytics. It also handled correction requests and disputes under Australian credit reporting law.

== Regulation, controversies, and criticisms ==
=== Data accuracy ===
Veda received criticism for errors in consumer credit files and delays in correcting inaccurate information.

=== Privacy and data sharing ===
In 2016, the Office of the Australian Information Commissioner opened an investigation into Veda’s marketing subsidiary, Inivio, over claims that it sold personal credit information to marketers.

=== ACCC action ===
In 2018, the Australian Competition & Consumer Commission commenced legal action against Equifax Pty Ltd (formerly Veda), alleging that, between 2013 and 2017, it made false representations about paid credit reports and correction processes.

== Role and influence ==
Veda was one of Australia's largest consumer credit reporting bodies. Its services were used by banks, telecommunications providers, utilities, and other credit issuers.
