= Buffalo Turkey Trot =

Annual footrace held in Buffalo, New York

YMCA Buffalo Niagara Turkey Trot
- Date: Thanksgiving Day
- Location: Buffalo, New York, United States
- Event type: Road
- Distance: 5 miles (8 kilometers (5.0 mi) certified)
- Primary sponsor: YMCA
- Established: November 26, 1896
- Website: ymcaturkeytrot.org
- Participants: over 14,000 (in 2018)

The YMCA Buffalo Niagara Turkey Trot is an annual 8K (4.97 miles) Thanksgiving footrace held in Buffalo, New York, each Thanksgiving Day. The Buffalo Turkey Trot, a popular fundraiser for the local branch of the YMCA, runs five miles down Delaware Avenue in Buffalo.

== History ==
The race proclaims itself to be the oldest continually running public footrace in North America, having established itself in 1896 and run every year since, even during World War I, the 1918 flu pandemic, World War II, and the 2020 coronavirus pandemic.

The Around the Bay Road Race in nearby Hamilton, Ontario, first run in 1894, also claims the title of Oldest Long-Distance Road Race in North America, although that race was not held during World War I, a ten-year stretch between 1925 and 1935, or in 2020 or 2021. Likewise, the Bemis Forslund Pie Race, the oldest footrace of any distance on the continent, has been held since 1891, but was canceled in 1936 due to a scarlet fever epidemic, and thus the Buffalo Turkey Trot has had the longer continuous run. It is a mere five months older than the Boston Marathon, launched April 1897. It has never been postponed nor cancelled due to weather in its history; the organizers keep "a plan in place" to ensure that the city's famous lake-effect snow storms do not threaten the event, a contingency that most prominently occurred in 2000 when the city specifically focused its snow removal efforts on the Turkey Trot course following a heavy snow event.

The Turkey Trot has increased in popularity in recent years. The inaugural race featured six runners (four of whom completed the race course), running on a dirt course; it shifted to a pavement course in the mid-1900s. A team competition was added in 1899 (that year was marred by a scandal in which a member of the Buffalo team completed part of the course riding a wagon and thereby forfeited the race to the team from Rochester) and continues to the present day. It was an all-male race from its founding through 1971; its first female contestant, Mary Ann Boles, ran the 1972 competition, in which there were 169 racers. In 1981, the race drew 1,069 runners. By 1986, the field had doubled in size to 2,000 runners, and by 1995 it had grown to 6,000 participants. It drew a crowd of 12,500 runners (the maximum the YMCA would allow) for the 2010 race, resulting in the YMCA arranging to increase capacity and accommodate 13,200 runners in 2011, which also maxed out several days before Thanksgiving. The race again filled the expanded 14,000-runner field over a week before Thanksgiving in 2012.

For the 2020 event, the YMCA reduced the field to 125 runners, but added a virtual race that allowed other participants to choose any 8-kilometer path of their choosing during Thanksgiving weekend; the limited field allowed the race to continue to claim a continuous streak of operations, while at the same time maintaining social distancing during the coronavirus pandemic. To compensate for the reduced field, and to reduce demand for registrations, the entry fee was increased over twentyfold from its usual fee to $1,000 per runner.

The race is a legitimate competition in that contestants are timed and records are kept. Concurrently, the race has a substantial fun run component, an element of the race that emerged spontaneously when a team ran an early 1980s race wearing hockey uniforms and mullets. Since then, participants in the Turkey Trot have been known to wear unusual costumes (comparable to those used by the contestants in the game show Let's Make a Deal) such as turkey suits, Chewbacca outfits, or formal wedding wear while racing. Former Headmen from Camp Pathfinder have portaged 16 foot wooden and canvas canoes the entire length of the race. The entry fee for 2021 ranged from $37 to $42, depending on the date of registration.

== See also ==
- World's Largest Disco
- Dallas Turkey Trot, the Buffalo Turkey Trot's cousin
