= Ball-Bartoe Jetwing =

Type of aircraft

JW-1 Jetwing
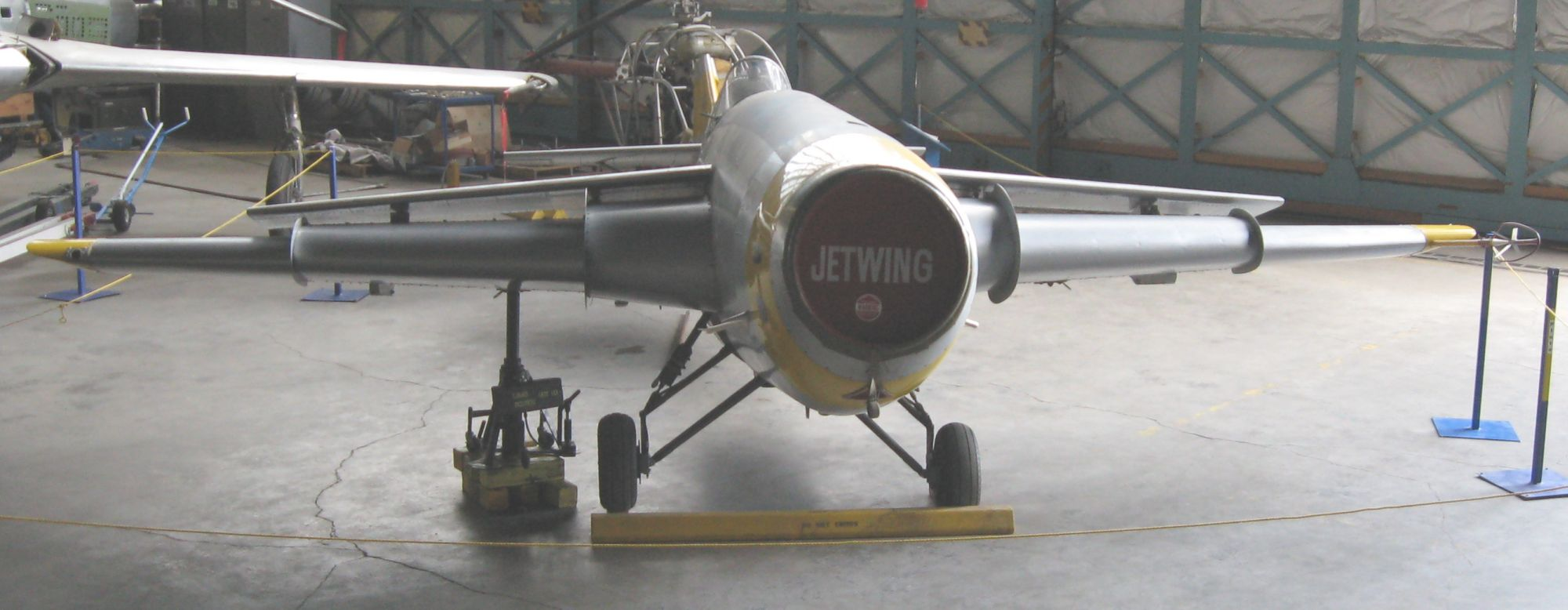

General information
- Type: Research aircraft
- Manufacturer: Ball-Bartoe
- Designer: Otto Bartoe
- Number built: 1

History
- First flight: 11 July 1977

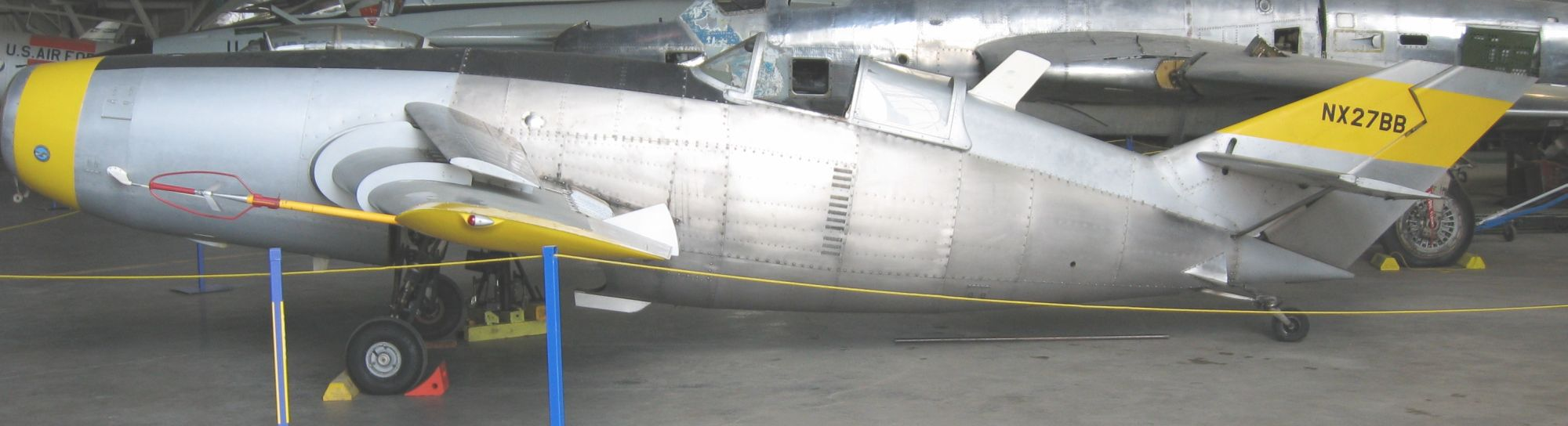

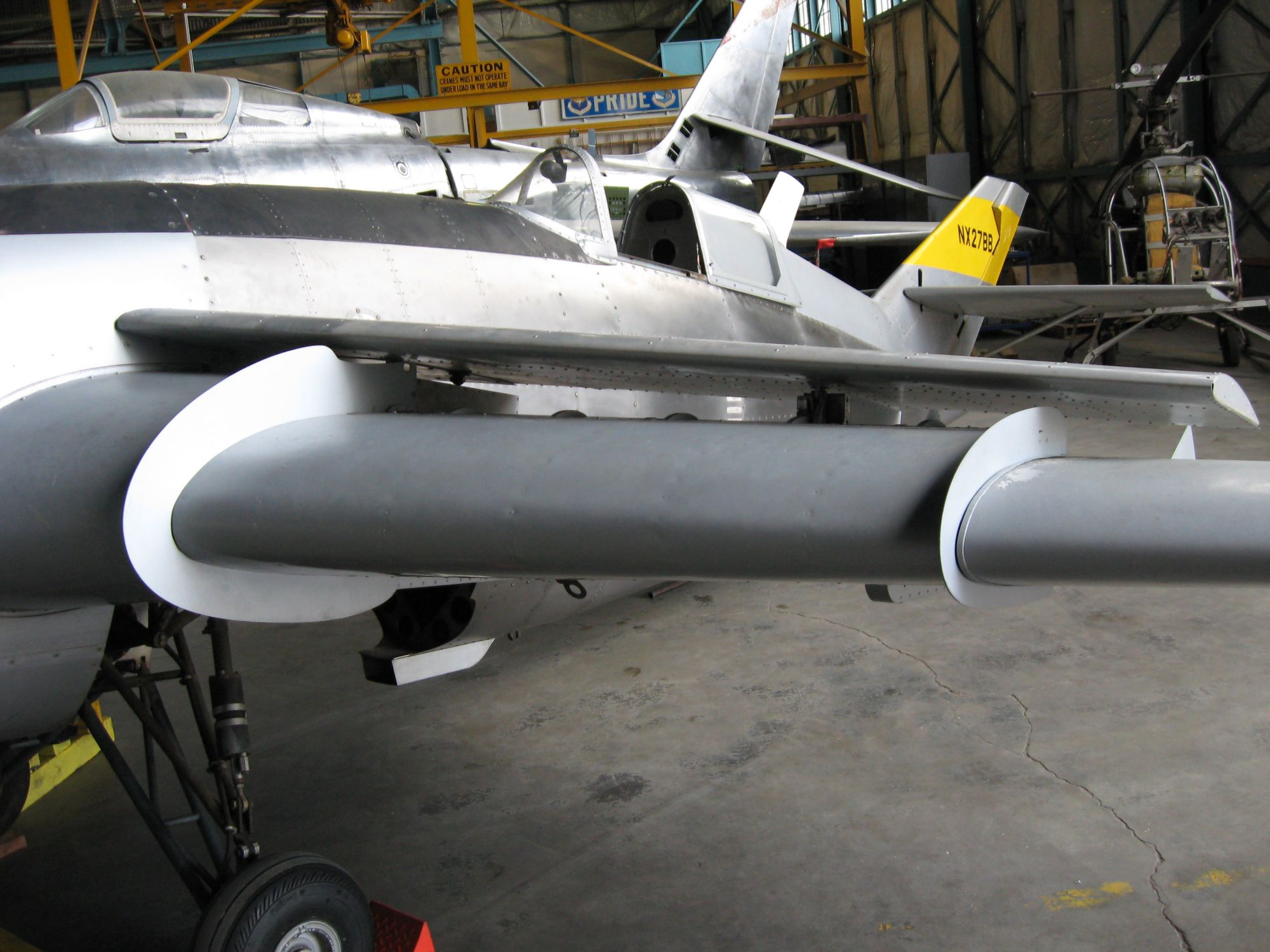
Augmentor detail

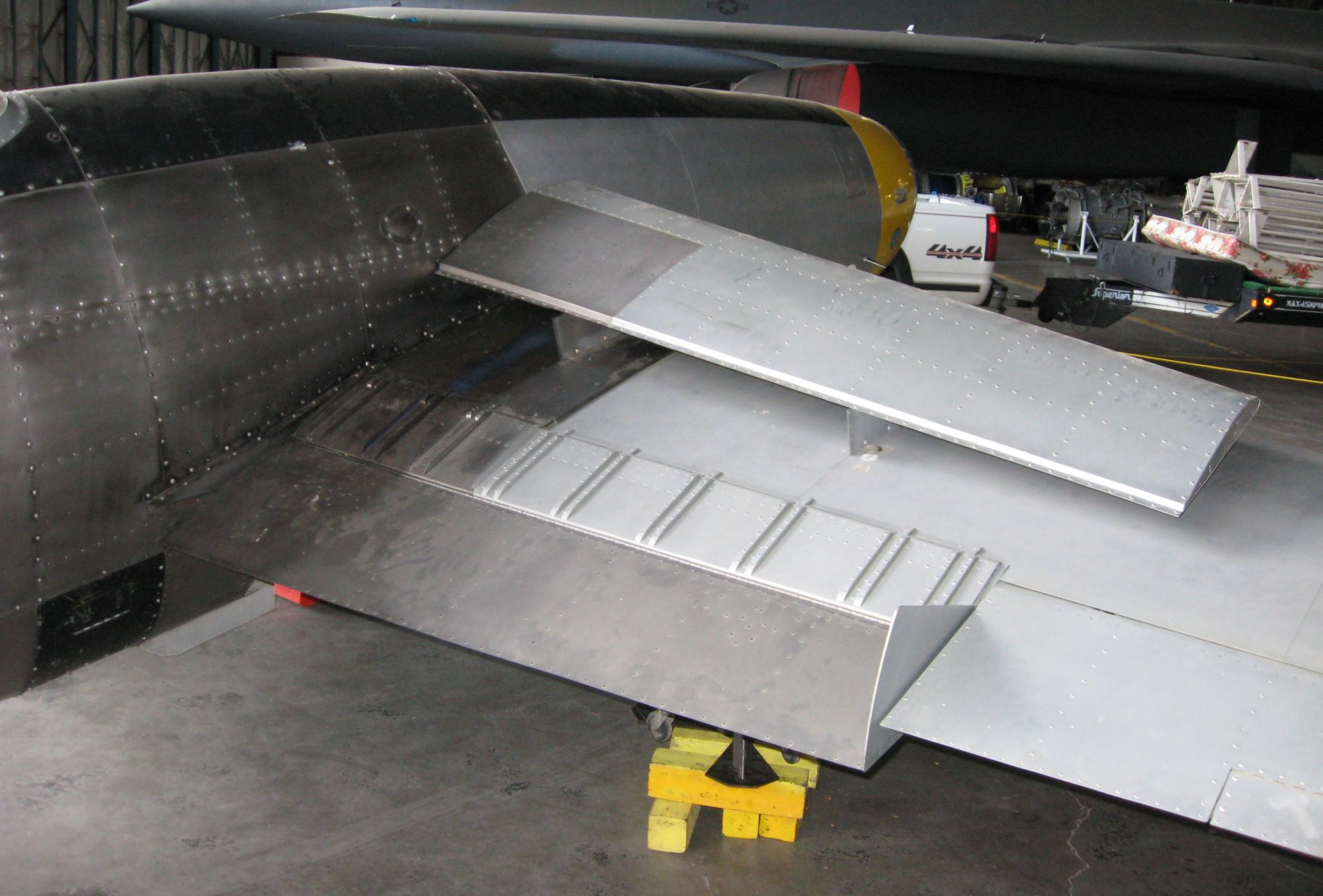
Augmentor detail

The Ball-Bartoe JW-1 Jetwing was a US research aircraft flown in the 1970s to investigate blown wing technology.

== Design and development ==
The Jetwing was a small, mid-wing design powered by a turbofan and fitted with tail-wheel undercarriage. The upper surface of the swept wings incorporated a slot along 70% span, through which air from the engine's fan stage could be discharged. Mounted above this slot was a small secondary airfoil called an "augmentor", intended to direct the discharged airflow over the wing. With this arrangement, it was found that the aircraft remained controllable at airspeeds as low as 34.76 kn (64.38 km/h; 40.00 mph).

The US Navy considered developing the Jetwing for use on short aircraft carriers. A new series of test flights were then carried out. Despite its top speed of 350 mph, the Navy was able to land the Jetwing in a mere 300 feet. Ultimately, the Navy discontinued blown-wing research in favor of vectored thrust technology. Following the test program, the aircraft was donated to the University of Tennessee Space Institute in Tullahoma, which donated the Jetwing to the Wings Over the Rockies Air and Space Museum in Denver, Colorado in 2007.

== Specifications (Jetwing) ==
Data from

General characteristics

- Crew: 1
- Length: 29 ft 0 in (8.84 m)
- Wingspan: 21 ft 9 in (6.63 m)
- Height: 6 ft 1 in (1.85 m)
- Wing area: 105 sq ft (9.8 m^{2})
- Aspect ratio: 4.5:1
- Empty weight: 2,500 lb (1,134 kg)
- Max takeoff weight: 3,336 lb (1,513 kg)
- Fuel capacity: 106 US gal (88 imp gal; 400 L)
- Powerplant: 1 × Pratt & Whitney Canada JT15D-1 turbofan, 2,200 lbf (9.8 kN) thrust

Performance

- Maximum speed: 347 kn (399 mph, 643 km/h)
- Range: 120 nmi (140 mi, 220 km)
- Endurance: 41 minutes
- Rate of climb: 6,000 ft/min (30 m/s)
