= Mark L. Feidler =

- Born: c. 1958
- Education: Duke University (BA); Vanderbilt University (JD)
- Occupation: Businessman
- Known for: Chairman of Equifax

Mark L. Feidler (born c. 1958) is an American lawyer and businessman. He serves as the chairman of Equifax.

== Early life ==
Feidler was born circa 1958. He graduated from Duke University in 1978, and he earned a JD from Vanderbilt University in 1981.

== Career ==
Feidler began his career as a lawyer for King & Spalding from 1981 to 1986. He worked for Robinson-Humphrey Company (later SunTrust Banks) from 1986 to 1990, followed by BellSouth from 1991 to 2000, and AT&T Mobility from 2000 to 2004.

Feidler co-founded MSouth Equity Partners, a private equity firm, in 2007. He serves as a partner.

Feidler succeeded Richard F. Smith as the chairman of Equifax in the wake of the 2017 data breach.
