= America's Hometown Thanksgiving Parade =

Annual parade held in Plymouth, Massachusetts

The America's Hometown Thanksgiving Parade is an annual parade held in Plymouth, Massachusetts. The parade, which began in 1996, is traditionally held the weekend before Thanksgiving and draws its name from the fact that Plymouth Colony was the landing point of the Pilgrims involved in the traditional "First Thanksgiving" in the early 1620s. Unlike most Thanksgiving parades, which include giant balloons of popular characters, the America's Hometown parade has a strict theme. Each element in the parade is based on the history of the United States and arranged in chronological order, with five divisions separated by century: the colonial period of the 17th century, the Revolutionary period of the 18th century, the Civil War and pioneer periods of the 19th century, military and automotive showcases from the 20th and 21st centuries, and the closing division, the last of which includes the traditional Santa Claus float. The parade is part of the broader America's Hometown Thanksgiving Celebration, which includes a number of ceremonies, including a Turkey Trot, concerts and a street fair.

The event was not held in its entirely in 2020 due to the COVID-19 pandemic in the United States. Organizers saw this as unintentionally fitting, given that it corresponded to the winter of 1620 and 1621, exactly 400 years prior, during which the Pilgrims that founded Plymouth Colony suffered great illness and hardship.

Broadcast rights to the parade are held by WCVB, which carries the parade live and on delay Thanksgiving morning and syndicates an edited version of the parade to its sister stations owned by Hearst Television.
