= The Work Number =

American employment verification database

The Work Number is an American employment verification database created in 1985 by Talx Corporation. Talx, (now Equifax Workforce Solutions) was acquired by Equifax Inc. in February 2007 for US$1.4 billion.

Through The Work Number, employers can purchase data on a prospective employee, including confirmation of an individual's employment records and income for verification purposes. The fee for information provided is given only after the requesting party answers several key questions.

Organizations that have used the Work Number include Fannie Mae, Hilton Hotels, Rent-A-Center, the United States Postal Service, Domino's Pizza, the University of Pennsylvania, and the University of Missouri System.

The Work Number collects and archives weekly salary information. It also collects length of employment, job titles, "location information", and "other kinds of human resources-related information, such as health care providers, whether someone has dental insurance and if they’ve ever filed an unemployment claim."

Equifax sells data to third parties. Companies, including "mortgage, auto and other financial services credit grantors", may request pay rate information similar to a credit report. Also, "debt/collection agencies may request employment information" to verify someone's place of employment.

== Controversies ==
=== Accuracy of information ===
Consumers have notified Privacy Rights Clearinghouse that The Work Number's data is inaccurate, with outdated job titles and other misrepresentations of their work history.

=== 2013 sale of sensitive personal information ===
It's the biggest privacy breach in our time, and it’s legal and no one knows it’s going on. It's like a secret CIA.

— Robert Mather, Pre-Employ.com

In January 2013, The Work Number was criticized for selling access to people's ostensibly private data, especially salary data, to third parties, without the informed consent of the subject. Organizations affected included Columbia University, and third parties included debt collection companies.

The director of policy and advocacy at the Privacy Rights Clearinghouse stated, "I think [this] is something that would be offensive to many people. One typically considers salary information to be shared by your employer just with the IRS."

=== 2017 exposure of Americans' salary data ===
On 8 October 2017, Brian Krebs reported that The Work Number exposed the salary histories of employees of tens of thousands of U.S. companies to anyone in possession of the employee's Social Security number and date of birth. For roughly half the U.S. population, both of the latter pieces of data are known to be in the possession of criminals, following Equifax's May-July 2017 security breach.
