= Skyote Aeromarine Skyote =

Skyote
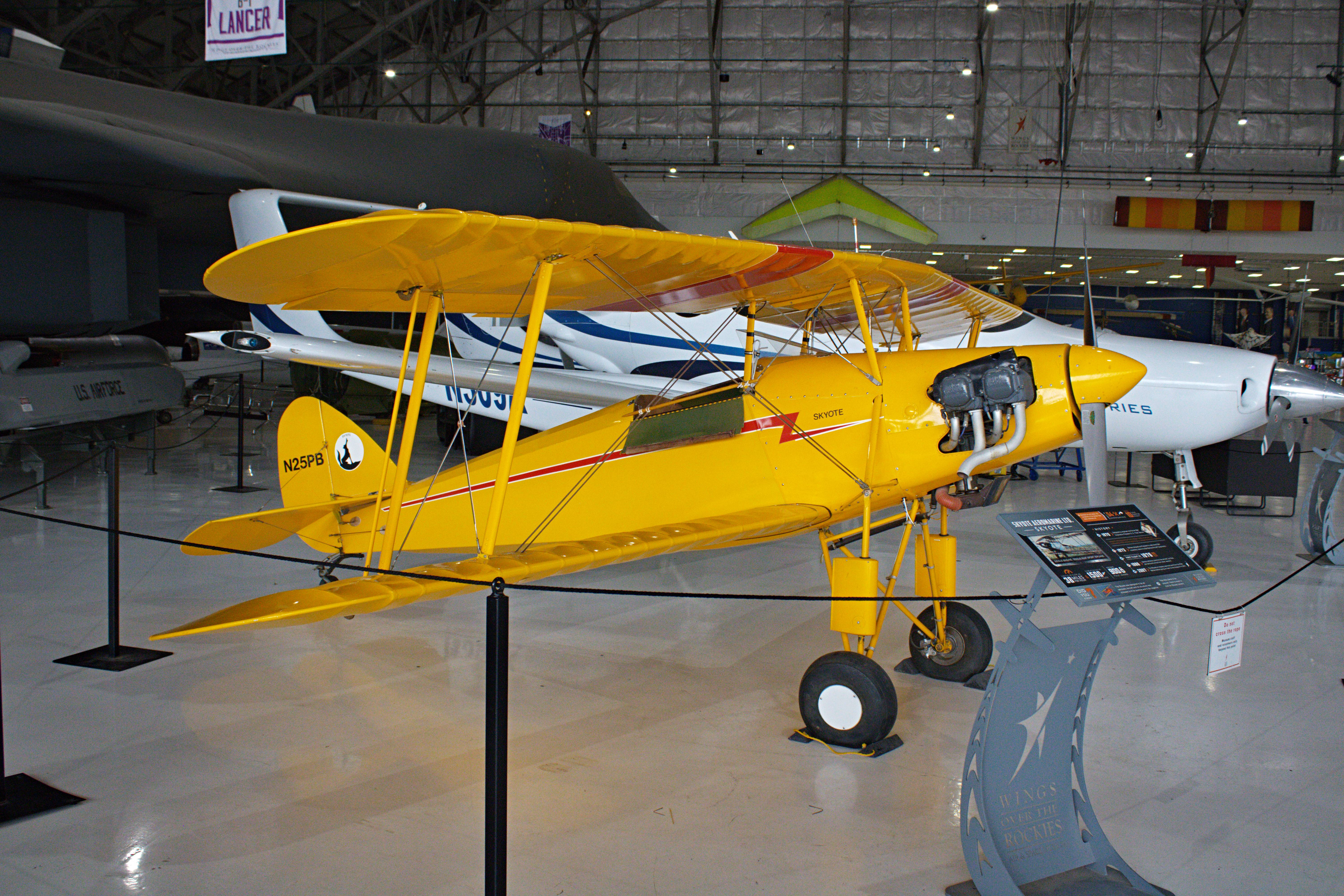
- Skyote on display at the Wings Over the Rockies Air and Space Museum

General information
- Type: Sport biplane
- National origin: United States
- Manufacturer: Skyote Aeromarine, Aircraft Spruce & Specialty Co.
- Designer: Otto E. Bartoe
- Number built: 54 sets of plans sold and 10 examples flying by 1985

History
- First flight: 23 April 1976

The Skyote Aeromarine Skyote (sometimes written "Skyotë", and pronounced either "Sky-oh-tee" or "Sky-yoat") is a single-engine, single-seat sport biplane designed in the 1970s in the United States and marketed as plans and kits for homebuilding.

== Design ==
The 'Skyote' is a conventional open-cockpit biplane design, with fixed, tailwheel undercarriage. The wings are slightly swept for center-of-gravity and lateral stability reasons and to improve performance in snap rolls. The equal-span, staggered wings are braced together with conventional struts and wires that form a single bay. Neither the upper nor lower wings have any dihedral, and ailerons are fitted to all four wings. The fuselage is built from welded steel tubing with wooden stringers and formers to give it shape, the wing structure is aluminum, and the entire aircraft is covered in fabric.

== Development ==
The Skyote was designed by O. E. "Pete" Bartoe, a biplane enthusiast who owned and flew a de Havilland Tiger Moth but had become attracted to more aerobatic types that he had flown at airshows, including the Rose Parakeet and Bücker Jungmeister. In the early 1970s, Bartoe operated the Ball-Bartoe Aircraft Corporation in Boulder, Colorado. When he remarked to the two mechanics who worked with him that he would like to see an aircraft that combined the best characteristics of the Parakeet and the Jungmann, they replied, "You design it and we'll build it on weekends."

Bartoe, an engineer, set out to create a biplane with "outstanding" aerobatic qualities (stressed to 9 Gs positive, 6 Gs negative), the responsive controls and structural strength of the Jungmann, the low-speed handling characteristics of the Parakeet, and good fuel economy. Bartoe used an aircraft design handbook from the 1930s as the starting point for the design, and the inspiration for the wing structure came from examining the construction of a Naval Aircraft Factory N3N wing that he found with its covering removed in a scrapyard in Greeley, Colorado. Bartoe refined what was essentially a 1930s design using the more advanced computational methods available in the 1970s that included a computerized stress analysis of the airframe. Minimising weight and therefore minimising wing loading was essential to achieving the low-speed flying characteristics and fuel economy that Bartoe wanted in the design. Again, Bartoe used computer analysis to identify areas of the structure where he could save weight without compromising the strength of the design. The resulting design is more complex and more difficult to build than most aircraft marketed for homebuilding. In particular, the aluminum wing ribs are designed to be hydroformed and then tempered. Bartoe therefore marketed wing kits along with Skyote plans through Skyote Aeromarine Ltd.

In April 1974, Bartoe and mechanic Brad Davenport built six Skyote frames, including two that Bartoe intended to use for a type certification program and one that would be used for testing and marketing purposes. Work on this latter aircraft began in earnest in March 1975 and this machine (registered NX8XX) first flew on 23 April 1976. Bartoe applied for certification on 17 February 1977, however, it was not until July 1981 that the first of the two aircraft intended for the certification program (Bartoe's own aircraft, cn/1, N25PB) flew.

Plans remained on sale until 1986, after which time Bartoe continued to sell wing and rib kits to existing plan owners. Plans were available for purchase again, in October 2004.

Pete Bartoe's personal aircraft (cn/1, N25PB) is currently on display at the Wings Over the Rockies Air & Space Museum in Denver, Colorado.

== Specifications (Skyote) ==
Data from Taylor 1985, p.618

General characteristics

- Crew: One pilot
- Length: 16 ft 3 in (4.95 m)
- Wingspan: 20 ft 0 in (6.10 m)
- Height: 6 ft 8 in (2.03 m)
- Wing area: 123 sq ft (11.4 m^{2})
- Empty weight: 593 lb (269 kg)
- Gross weight: 895 lb (406 kg)
- Powerplant: 1 × Continental C90-8F , 90 hp (67 kW)

Performance

- Maximum speed: 157 mph (253 km/h, 136 kn)
- Range: 207 mi (333 km, 180 nmi)
- Service ceiling: 16,500 ft (5,030 m)
- Rate of climb: 1,500 ft/min (7.6 m/s)
