= Equifax Workforce Solutions =

- Formerly: TALX
- Industry: financial services
- Founded: 1972
- Key people: Bill Canfield
- Subsidiaries: Equifax

Equifax Workforce Solutions, formerly known as TALX (pronounced "talks"), is a wholly owned subsidiary of Equifax. It is based in St. Louis, Missouri. The company was originally founded in 1972 under the name Interface Technology Inc. The company maintains a database named "The Work Number" that holds and maintains employment and payroll information on 54 million American people. As of 2015, the company was the largest source of employment information in the United States, and collects information from over 7,000 employers.

== History ==
Based out of St. Louis, TALX was founded in 1972 as Interface Technology Inc. by several individuals including H. Richard "Rick" Grodsky, Professor of Electrical Engineering at the McKelvey School of Engineering at Washington University in St. Louis. Interface Technology provided interactive voice response systems. Bill Canfield joined the company in 1986 as President and CEO and added the title of Chairman in 1988. TALX went public listing on the NASDAQ in an IPO in 1996 and offered 2,000,000 shares at $9 per share for a total offer amount of $18,000,000. TALX Corp. At the time of the IPO, TALX designed and implemented interactive communication solutions using computer telephony to integrate technologies such as interactive voice response, fax, email, Internet and corporate intranet. TALX's interactive communication solutions enabled an organization's employees, customers, vendors and business partners to access, input and update information stored in databases without human assistance. TALX also provided a branded employment and income verification service, The Work Number for Everyone, that a provided automated access to employment and salary records of large employers for purposes of loan and other credit approvals.

In the early 2000s, the employment and income verification service, The Work Number, as it later became known, became the revenue and profit growth engine for the company. In March 2002, TALX Corporation acquired two large human resource outsourcing companies that specialized in unemployment cost management and related human resource applications, The Frick Company, headquartered in St. Louis, Missouri, and Gates McDonald, a subsidiary of Nationwide Mutual Insurance Company, headquartered in Columbus, Ohio. TALX sold its e-Choice Benefits Enrollment Services business to Workscape in April 2003 to focus on its core business of payroll-centric services.

Between 2002 and 2005, acquired Johnson & Associates LLC, TBT Enterprises Inc., UI Advantage Inc., Jon-Jay Associates Inc., Employers Unity Inc. and parts of Sheakley-Uniservice Inc. TALX also added or created a number of other payroll-centric Human Resource related employer services including W-2 Management, I-9 Management, Tax Credit and Incentive Management, and Online Paperless Pay.

In 2007, TALX was acquired by Equifax, one of the big three credit reporting agencies, in a transaction valued at $1.4 billion. As of 2010, integration was completed and TALX now officially operates as a division of Equifax.

In October 2012, Equifax changed the name of the TALX business unit to Equifax Workforce Solutions.

=== SEC investigation of TALX ===
The Securities and Exchange Commission (SEC) conducted an investigation into TALX's August 2001 secondary offering of common stock and 2001 financial results. In August 2004, TALX reached an agreement with the SEC to end the ongoing SEC investigation, agreeing that the company would pay a fine of $2.5 million. Separately, William W. Canfield, the company's president and chief executive officer, reached an agreement in principle with the SEC staff to settle its ongoing investigation against him in a related matter. Canfield agreed to pay $859,999 in disgorgement and $100,000 in civil penalties.

The SEC filed fraud charges March 2005 against TALX Corp.'s former chief financial officer. The SEC alleged that Craig N. Cohen, who resigned in January 2004, violated antifraud and other federal securities laws by causing TALX to meet its 2001 financial target through fraudulent accounting practices. As a result, TALX overstated its 2001 income by about $2.1 million, or 65 percent, which inflated its stock price. Cohen then sold TALX shares. He is also accused of making misleading statements to auditors. The SEC sought a permanent injunction against Cohen, an officer and director bar and civil penalties. Cohen had served as chief financial officer from January 1994 to May 2003, and was vice president of application services and software from May 1999 to May 2003. He resigned at the same time TALX said it would restate its earnings for the fiscal years 1999 to 2003 to correct errors in the way it accounted for revenue. April 2007 the US District Court dismissed six of the seven counts against Cohen. The Court found Cohen guilty of the allegation of insufficient internal controls. The Court stated that there was evidence that Cohen knew he was falsely recording two projects as bill-and-hold transactions. The Court imposed a civil penalty against Cohen in the amount of $5,000.

=== FTC investigation of TALX ===
In June 2006 TALX announced that it was voluntarily responding to an initial inquiry by the Federal Trade Commission (FTC) to assess whether TALX acquisitions in the unemployment compensation and Work Number businesses had significantly reduced competition.

=== 2017 Customer Data Breach ===
From April 2016 to March 2017, Equifax Workforce Solutions data including individuals' tax records was taken in a data breach.

== Criticisms of TALX ==
In April 2010, The New York Times published an article about TALX. In short, TALX was accused of contesting unemployment benefits claims regardless of their merit in an effort to reduce the funds their clients — the employers — would have to pay to state unemployment insurance pools. The article pointed out that some unemployed persons were denied benefits as a result of TALX's actions.

== See also ==
- The Work Number
