= Turkey trot =

Type of seasonal running event

Man dressed as a turkey takes part in a 10K run on Thanksgiving Day

Turkey trots are footraces, usually of the long-distance variety, held on or around Thanksgiving Day in the United States. The name is derived from the use of turkey as a common centerpiece of the Thanksgiving dinner. A few races in the United Kingdom during the Christmas period are described as turkey trots because turkey is traditionally eaten at Christmas there. In the United States, many courses used for these Thanksgiving events are run at a certified USA Track & Field road race distances between 5Ks and a half marathon; others are informal fun runs between 1.0 mile (1.6 km) and 5 km. The 5 km distance is the most common distance offered, with over 90% of the races being of that distance. The fun runs are often run as charity benefits and feature runners in costumes, particularly as turkeys. The oldest documented turkey trot, a still-ongoing annual event in Buffalo, New York, dates to 1896.

The Atlanta Marathon, which ran on Thanksgiving from 1981 to 2009, was the last full 26.2-mile (42.2 km) marathon to be run on the holiday. Since 2010 the Atlanta Track Club eliminated the marathon distance on Thanksgiving but continued to host a half marathon. Both the Yonkers Marathon and the Detroit Free Press Marathon (then known as the Detroit Motor City Marathon) started out as Thanksgiving Day races before moving to other dates.

In 2021, Molly Seidel participated in the Berbee Derby held in Fitchburg, Wisconsin and set the record for the fastest run for an individual dressed as a turkey.

== Notable races ==
An estimated 1,100,000 people took part in one of the 936 turkey trots that took place in 2024, spanning across all 50 states, with Florida having the most turkey trots with 56. The number of participants in such races has been on an upward trajectory, as less than 700,000 participants raced a turkey trot in 2011. Of those 936 races, 322 of them hosted a field of over 1,000 runners, up sharply from the 249 such races in 2023 and approximately 80 in 2017. These events raised over $3,600,000 in revenue, most of which went to charity.

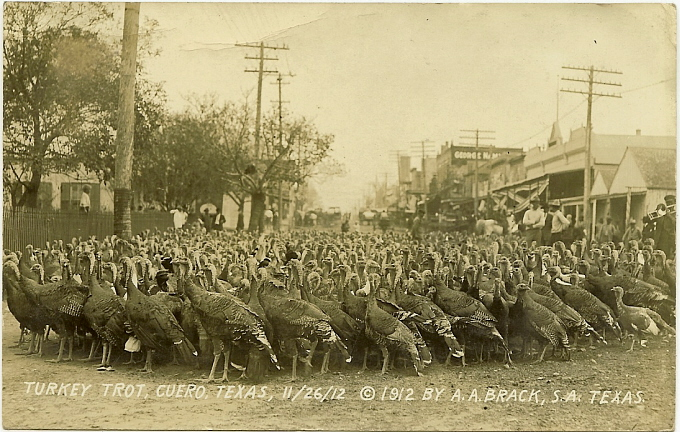
Cuero, Texas, holds a turkey trot every November where hundreds of turkeys parade through the town (1912).

Turkey trots
Name	Location	Inaugural race	Distance	Notes
Alexandria Turkey Trot	Alexandria, Virginia	1975	5 miles (8 km)	A USATF-certified race organized by DC Road Runners and the Del Ray Business Association. This race is organized to support ALIVE!, a local organization that combats food insecurity.
American Turkey Tradition	(various, 27 locations)		(various)	A series of races in multiple cities; claims to be the world's largest Thanksgiving running festival and listed 27 races across 12 US states in 2019, including overseeing the Turkey Trots in major cities such as New York City, St. Louis, Kansas City, Cincinnati and Louisville, among others.
Berwick Run for the Diamonds	Berwick, Pennsylvania	1908	9 miles (14 km)	Name changed from Berwick Marathon in the early 1980s.
Buffalo Turkey Trot	Buffalo, New York	1896	8 kilometres (5.0 mi)	The oldest continually running public footrace (established in 1896) in the United States. 14,000 runners annually.
Concord Turkey Trot	Concord, Massachusetts			
Cuero Texas Turkey Trot	Cuero, Texas			Features a unique twist on the tradition in which the participants are all actual domestic turkeys. This event is now held on the second weekend of October (coincidentally the same weekend as Canadian Thanksgiving).
Dallas Turkey Trot	Dallas, Texas	1940s	8 miles (13 km)	More than 25,000 racers annually.
Dana Point Turkey Trot	Dana Point, California	1977		Attracts over 18,000 people to the Dana Point Harbor in Southern California, and has donated over $500,000 to local charities.
Feaster Five Road Race	Andover, Massachusetts	1988	5 miles (8.0 km)	
Hyde Park Pilgrim Run	Kansas City, Missouri			
Invesco QQQ Half Marathon	Atlanta, Georgia			Was the nation's largest half marathon run on Thanksgiving morning, originally a marathon and half marathon from 1981 to 2009, but was raced only as a half from 2010-19. The race was cancelled in May 2020 as a result of the coronavirus pandemic that moved the Peachtree Road Race to the Thanksgiving date. Between 1981 and 2009, the event also coincided with the Atlanta Marathon, making it the longest distance for a turkey trot in the United States.
Kitchener–Waterloo_Oktoberfest 5K Fun Run	Regional Municipality of Waterloo, Ontario, Canada		5 kilometres (3.1 mi)	Held on Canadian Thanksgiving
Manchester Road Race	Manchester, Connecticut	1927	4.748 miles (7.641 km)	
Mile High United Way Turkey Trot	Denver, Colorado			Held on Thanksgiving Day in Washington Park for over four decades.
Plymouth Turkey Trot	Plymouth, Massachusetts			Part of America's Hometown Thanksgiving Celebration
Run to Feed the Hungry race	Sacramento, California	1994		Attracts over 31,000 runners annually.
San Francisco Turkey Trot	San Francisco, California			Takes place in Golden Gate Park on Thanksgiving Day.
Schuylkill Navy Run	Philadelphia, Pennsylvania	1899	5+5/8 mi	Put on by Boathouse Row in Philadelphia.
Silicon Valley Turkey Trot	San Jose, California	2004	5 km, 10 km	Has over 25,000 participants.
Smoke the Turkey Trot	Sylvania, Ohio		5 kilometres (3.1 mi)	Goes through Saint James Wood neighborhood and regularly has over 2,000 participants. Many participants adorn costumes or wear Michigan/Ohio State colors (the OSU/UM football game is generally played on the fourth Saturday in November).
Tampa Bay Times Turkey Trot	Clearwater, Florida			Annual attendance for this event reaches over 17,000 registered racers.
ThunderCloud Subs Turkey Trot	Austin, Texas	1990	5 miles (8.0 km)	20,000 people normally participate
Troy Turkey Trot	Troy, New York	1916	5 km, 10 km, 1 mile	There were six runners in the inaugural race, but it is now one of the largest and oldest turkey trots in the United States.
Watertown Turkey Day Run	Watertown, New York	1983	5 kilometres (3.1 mi)	Most notable for a 2024 incident in which runners were literally run over by a (rein)deer, as a group of deer charged through the pack of runners shortly after the race began, colliding with two.
University of Alberta Turkey Trot	Edmonton, Alberta, Canada	1960	5 km (nominal)	After regularly occurring 1960–2019, there was a hiatus 2020–2024 this event returned in 2025 and will continue.
