= Atlanta Speedway Airport =

Public-use Airport serving Henry County, Georgia, United States

Atlanta Speedway Airport (formerly Henry County Airport and Bear Creek Airport)

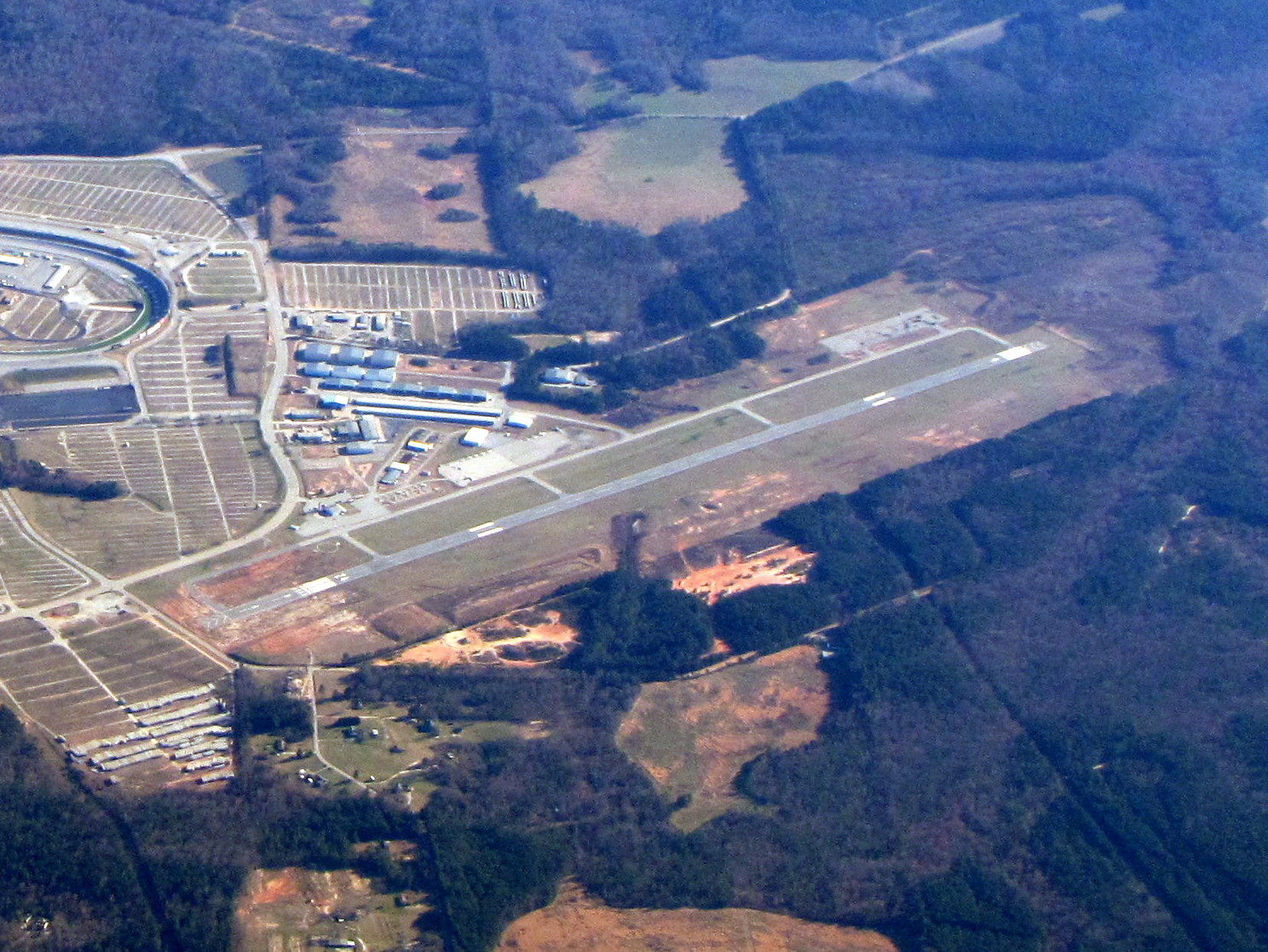
- Atlanta Speedway Airport in 2017
- IATA: none; ICAO: KHMP; FAA LID: HMP

Summary
- Airport type: Public
- Owner: Henry County
- Serves: Hampton, Georgia
- Elevation AMSL: 874 ft (266 m)
- Coordinates: 33°23′21″N 084°19′56″W
- Website: atlantaspeedwayairport.com

Map
- Location of airport in Georgia

Runways
| Direction | Length | | Surface |
| Direction | ft | m | Surface |
|---|---|---|---|
| 6/24 | 5,500 | 1,676 | Asphalt |

Statistics (2011)
- Aircraft operations: 42,000
- Based aircraft: 93
- Sources: Henry County, FAA, GDOT

Atlanta Speedway Airport (ICAO: KHMP, FAA LID: HMP)(formerly 4A7), is a public-use airport located three nautical miles (6 km) west of the central business district of Hampton, a city in Henry County, Georgia, United States. It was known as Clayton County Airport – Tara Field, which was the name still used by the Federal Aviation Administration (FAA) and the Georgia Department of Transportation (GDOT) until 2011. The airport was renamed Atlanta South Regional Airport, which was approved by the airport board of commissioners in December 2011, and was approved by the GDOT and the FAA before it went into effect. It was also known as Henry County Airport from 2013 to 2017.

Although the airport is located in Henry County, it was owned and operated by Clayton County to the north from 1992 until 2011. It is not near most of that county, except for its very small southern tip. The north end of Clayton County has part of Hartsfield-Jackson Atlanta International Airport, thus Tara Field served general aviation, especially for the Atlanta Motor Speedway immediately next to it. At its July 12, 2011, meeting, the Clayton County Board of Commissioners voted to sell the airport to Henry County in a deal worth $17.7 million. The Henry County Board of Commissioners agreed to the purchase at a meeting on July 13, 2011, and the sale was completed in August 2011. Henry County paid just $2.7 million toward the purchase price, with the Federal Aviation Administration and the Georgia Department of Transportation funding the balance of $15 million.

The Henry County Board of Commissioners voted Tuesday, December 4, 2012, to move forward with the runway expansion project, which extended the runway to 5,500 feet and widened it by 25 feet. The project was complete in time for the Labor Day race at Atlanta Motor Speedway in Hampton. This airport is included in the National Plan of Integrated Airport Systems for 2011–2015, which categorized it as a general aviation facility. There is no weather station or FAA flight info reported for this airport.

On April 15, 2013, the airport runway was closed for 2 months to allow for construction on widening of the runway. Phase I of the Airport Expansion began in February 2013 and was completed for the 2013 NASCAR weekend at the nearby Speedway. Expansion consisted of adding 1,000 feet to the 24 end and widening the existing runway 25 feet. At the completion of Phase I, the new runway will be 5,503 feet long by 100 feet wide.

== History ==
The airport was originally named Bear Creek Airport and was built in the late 60's and operated by a Mr. Morris.

In July 2005, the airport and the adjacent speedway were hit by an F2 tornado on the evening of July 6. Millions of dollars in damage was done to the airport, in addition to the tens of millions at the speedway. Four airplanes were flipped over, hangars were torn apart, and fiberglass insulation and sheet metal were plastered into iron fences, along with another plane. The storm was a result of Hurricane Cindy, after it had already been downgraded to a tropical depression after landfall.

Another severe thunderstorm struck in 2014, causing a downburst with winds at minimal hurricane strength on the evening of September 7. Planes were again flipped over, destroying six of them and damaging another 15, in addition to relatively minor damage to some hangar doors and other airport facilities.

The FAA has changed the airport ID from 4A7 to KHMP.

In 2013, the county changed the facility’s name from Atlanta South Regional Airport to Henry County Airport, and again in 2017 to Atlanta Speedway Airport, due to its location across the street from Atlanta Motor Speedway, where Turns 1 and 2 overlook the runway.

Speedway Motorsports officials have indicated that they will allow the county to use the new name which identifies the airport more closely with the race track facility (aircraft used by teams will fly into the airport), and it will also help increase visibility around the United States for economic development purposes.

== Facilities and aircraft ==
The airport covers an area of 160 acres (65 ha) at an elevation of 874 feet (266 m) above mean sea level. It has one runway designated 6/24 with an asphalt surface measuring 5,501 by 100 feet (1,677 x 30 m).

For the 12-month period ending June 9, 2011, the airport had 42,000 aircraft operations, an average of 115 per day: 96% general aviation and 4% air taxi. At that time there were 93 aircraft based at this airport: 63% single-engine, 15% multi-engine, 4% jet, 14% helicopter, and 3% ultralight.

== See also ==
- Army Aviation Heritage Foundation and Flying Museum
- List of airports in Georgia (U.S. state)
