= Mark Begor =

American business executive

- Born: c. 1959
- Education: Syracuse University; Rensselaer Polytechnic Institute
- Occupation: Businessman
- Known for: CEO-elect of Equifax

Mark Begor (born c. 1959) is an American business executive. He is the CEO of Equifax.

== Early life ==
Begor was born circa 1959. He graduated from Syracuse University with a bachelor's degree and earned a master in business administration from the Rensselaer Polytechnic Institute.

== Career ==
Begor worked for General Electric for 35 years. He subsequently worked for Warburg Pincus. He has been the chief executive officer of Equifax since April 2018.
