= Ball-Bartoe =

Aerodynamics research firm and aircraft manufacturer (1973–1978)

The Ball-Bartoe Aircraft Corporation was a US aerodynamics research firm and aircraft manufacturer established as a joint venture between Ball Corp and aerodynamicist Otto Bartoe in Boulder, Colorado in 1973. The firm conducted research into blown wings as a means of increasing aircraft lift at low airspeeds and constructed a research aircraft, the Ball-Bartoe Jetwing, as a testbed for these studies. The firm was dissolved in 1978.

== Bibliography ==
- Gunston, Bill (1993). World Encyclopedia of Aircraft Manufacturers. Annapolis: Naval Institute Press. p. 39.
