= Army Aviation Heritage Foundation and Flying Museum =

- Established: June 1997
- Founder: Michael Brady
- Type: Nonprofit
- Website: www.armyav.org

The Army Aviation Heritage Foundation and Flying Museum is a non-profit organization headquartered at the Atlanta Speedway Airport in Hampton, Georgia focused on the history of US Army aviation.

== History ==
=== Establishment ===
The Army Aviation Heritage Foundation was incorporated in June 1997 by Michael Brady, an airline entrepreneur and the son of Vietnam veteran Major General Morris Brady.

As a result of an amendment to a federal law passed in July 2003, ownership of an L-19 was transferred from the State Department to the foundation.

The foundation's hangar and aircraft, including a C-7 were damaged by a tornado in July 2005. The C-7 was sold to the Cavanaugh Flight Museum two years later.

=== Expansion ===
The Arizona Chapter was established in October 2015 after Dave Sale, a member of the Commemorative Air Force, contacted the foundation about putting a UH-1 on display at the CAF Airbase Arizona.

The Gateway Chapter was established on 22 December 2016 and was given an OH-58A project. The following September it acquired a surplus UH-1H.

The Arizona Chapter merged with the SoCal Detachment in January 2020 to create the Southwest Chapter.

The Tar Heel Chapter was established on 1 July 2026.

== Chapters ==
The organization has four chapters:

- Legacy Chapter at Atlanta Speedway Airport in Hampton, Georgia
- Southwest Chapter at Falcon Field in Mesa, Arizona
- Gateway Chapter at Creve Coeur Airport in St. Louis, Missouri
- Tar Heel Chapter at Moore County Airport in Carthage, North Carolina

== Collection ==
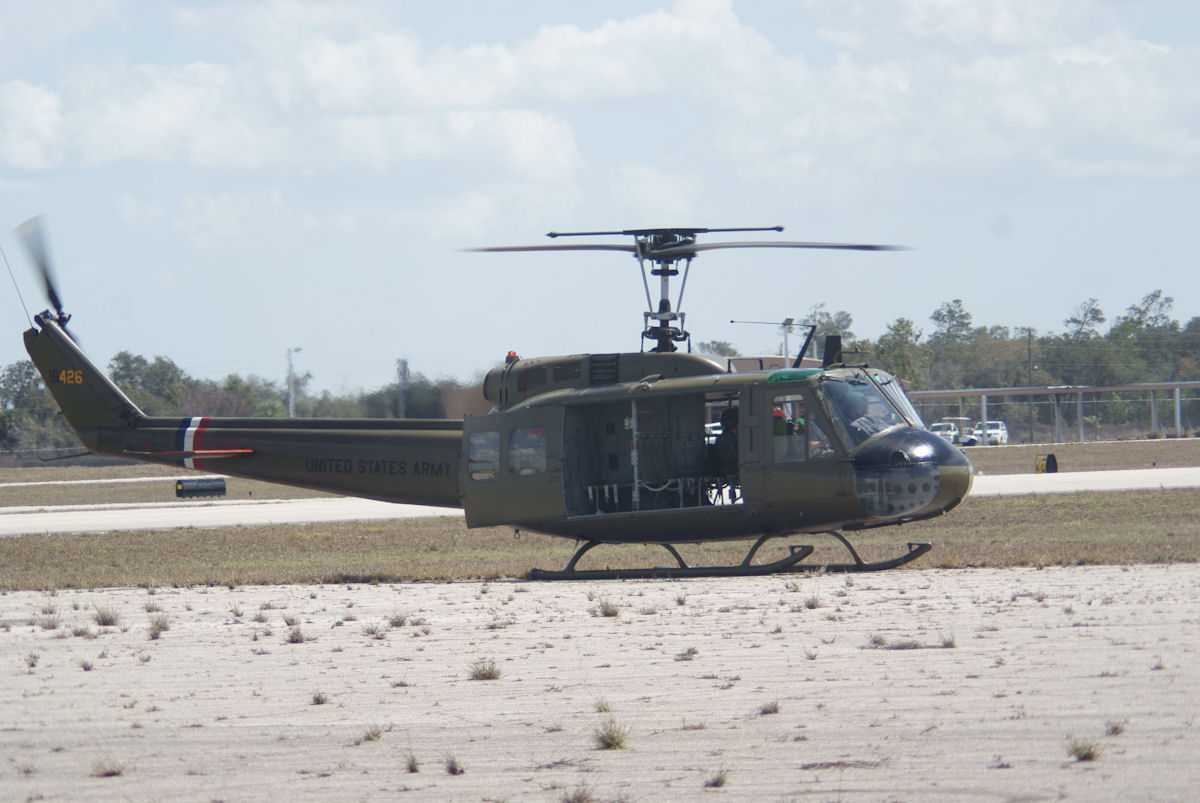
Bell UH-1H Iroquis

- Bell AH-1F Cobra 66-15283
- Bell AH-1F Cobra 67-15589
- Bell AH-1F Cobra 67-15766
- Bell AH-1F Cobra 67-15826
- Bell AH-1S Cobra 71-20998
- Bell OH-58A Kiowa 71-20541
- Bell UH-1H Iroquois 66-16624
- Bell UH-1H Iroquois 68-16104
- Bell UH-1H Iroquois 69-15354
- Bell UH-1H Iroquois 70-16426
- Cessna L-19D Bird Dog

=== Aircraft in Storage ===
The organization has additional aircraft in storage as sources of spare parts. These include thirteen aircraft recovered from Fort Drum as well as an OH-6, OV-1D and T-42.

== Programs ==
The organization offers rides in its aircraft. It also operates an aerial demonstration team called the Sky Soldiers.
