= Jewish critical race theory =

Jewish critical race theory (HebCrit) is an emerging framework applying critical race theory to Jewish identity and experience. HebCrit seeks to address the lack of Jewish inclusion in the study of race and culture, and, as an interdisciplinary theory, draws from critical race theory, history, sociology, psychology, education, and Jewish studies. It sees Jewish people as a racialized minority in order to encourage critical inquiry into how race and Jewishness interact. From critical race theory, Hebcrit adapts concepts like intersectionality, the black-white binary, and critical whiteness studies, to explain Jewish racial identity.

== Tenets ==
HebCrit has five primary arguments or assertions:

1. Antisemitism continues to target Jewish people as a form of racism.
2. Jewish people are a racialized group.
3. When a Jewish person is labeled white, they may experience a sense of tension and invisibility.
4. The immense social, economic, and political power that is popularly attributed to Jews is hyperbolic.
5. Jewish counterstories have value.

== Emergence ==
The term "Hebcrit" as Jewish critical race theory was coined by University of Derby education professor Daniel Ian Rubin in 2020. Rubin laid out his proposal for HebCrit, including the five major tenets. He wrote that "Due to the lived experiences of Jewish people in the U.S., I argue that Jews are a race and need to be studied as such in CRT." In a 2024 paper, Noah D. Drezner critiqued and expanded on HebCrit with a focus on intersectionality, education, and diversity, equity, and inclusion efforts.

== Themes ==
=== Antisemitism as racism ===
HebCrit scholars see antisemitism as a global form of racism that is unique from other racisms, and regard antisemitism as seemingly invisible due to the lack of formal attention it receives. Antisemitism is understood as racializing, defining, and impacting Jews as a minority racial group.

=== Judeopessimism ===
Shaul Magid coined Judeopessimism, drawing from Afropessimism, to describe how antisemitism is constitutive of the non-Jewish world. Judeopessimism says that anti-Jewishness is under-theorized and under-assessed, and more critical inquiry is needed. The theory sees the racism that Jews face as embedded into the fabric of Western society. Antisemitism is not an aberration within society, but a foundational and core component of it. The idea was inspired by Black studies and Black scholarly commitment to interrogating the constitutive nature of anti-Blackness regarding how society is built and maintained.

=== Superpositionality ===
GDL proposed superpositionality to explain how Jewish racial identity, rather than being unitarily white or non-white, is both at the same time. He writes that Jewish racial identity is superpositional, or in two places at once, and that Jewish people experience a friction when labeled as white, because the imposition of a white identity conflicts with the experiences of racial oppression. When a superpositional identity, such as that of Jews and Sápmi people, is deemed white by an external observer, the identity is collapsed into a unitary "white" label.

=== Ashkenormativity ===
HebCrit points out that Ashkenazi Jews are disproportionately represented in discussions and research on Jewish identity and culture, leading many to associate general Jewishness with Ashkenazi Jewishness. This association also has implications for how the average person perceives and engages with the racialization of Jewish people.

== See also ==
- Afropessimism
- Ashkenormativity
- Disability studies
- Intersectionality
- Tribal critical race theory
