= Tribal critical race theory =

Academic framework

Tribal critical race theory (Tribal CRT) is an emerging framework that combines elements of critical race theory (CRT) and Indigenous studies to analyze the intersections of race, power, and tribal sovereignty. It explores the social construction of race, the impact of racism and colonialism on Indigenous experiences, and the tensions between tribal sovereignty and colonial legal frameworks. Through incorporating Indigenous experiences, it also aims to develop comprehensive analyses of race and power in education, advocating for the inclusion of Indigenous knowledge systems and voices to promote equity and challenge existing power structures.

== See also ==
- Intersectionality
- Jewish critical race theory
