= Richard Smith =

Richard Smith may refer to:

== Arts and entertainment ==
- RAS-1, stage name of Richard Arthur Smith, American musician
- Richard Bernhard Smith (1901–1935), American composer who wrote the lyrics to "Winter Wonderland"
- Richard Curson Smith, British television director and producer
- Richard H. E. Smith II, American software engineer, computer consultant and science fiction fanzine publisher
- Richard John Smith (1786–1855), British actor
- Richard Langham Smith (born 1947), British academic, head of music at the Open University
- Richard Penn Smith (1799–1854), American playwright
- Richard O'Brien (born 1942), stage name of Richard Timothy Smith, British-New Zealand writer and actor
- Richard Smith (American guitarist), jazz guitarist in California
- Richard Smith (artist) (1931–2016), English painter
- Richard Smith (English guitarist) (born 1971), English-born fingerstyle guitarist in Nashville, Tennessee
- Rick Smith (musician) (born 1959), member of English dance duo Underworld
- Richard Smith (screenwriter), Scottish screenwriter, film director, BAFTA-winning writer of Trauma
- Richard Smith (silent film director) (1886–1937), American silent film director
- Richard Zane Smith (born 1955), American sculptor

== Journalism ==
- Richard Mills Smith (born 1946), American editor and journalist, Chairman of Newsweek magazine
- Richard Smith (editor), British medical doctor, former editor of the British Medical Journal

== Military ==
- Richard Smith (soldier) (c. 1790–1819), Canadian soldier and magistrate
- Richard Baird Smith (1818–1861), British engineer officer
- Richard Abel Smith (1933–2004), British Army officer
- Richard Smith (East India Company officer) (1734–1803), Commander-in-Chief, India

== Politics ==
- R. Maclin Smith (1906–1971), American politician from Virginia
- Richard Smith (MP for Devizes), MP for Devizes, 1402
- Richard Smith (died 1516), MP for Reading
- Richard Smith (died 1581), MP for Newcastle-under-Lyme
- Richard Smith (fl. 1584), MP for Cricklade
- Richard Smith (Canadian politician) (1931–1978), former Liberal MPP for Nipissing, Ontario
- Richard Smith (Continental Congress) (1735–1803), lawyer and New Jersey delegate to the Continental Congress
- Richard B. Smith (New York politician) (1878–1937), New York politician
- Richard M. Smith (1828–1888), legislator from Mineral Point, Wisconsin
- Richard Smith (diplomat) (1934–2015), Australian diplomat, Australian High Commissioner to the UK
- Richard Joseph Smith (1819–1883), member of both the New South Wales Legislative Council and the Queensland Legislative Council
- Richard A. Smith (Connecticut politician), American politician in the Connecticut House of Representatives
- Ric Smith (Richard C. Smith, born 1944), Australian public servant
- Richard H. Smith (1945–2024), member of the Georgia House of Representatives
- Richard "Mouse" Smith (1949–2025), former President of the Delaware NAACP State Conference and a close friend to Joe Biden

== Science ==
- Richard Smith (mining engineer) (1783–1868), English-born mining engineer and politician in Nova Scotia
- Richard Smith (historical geographer) (born 1946), British academic, historical geographer and demographer
- Richard A. Smith (physician) (1932–2017), African-American physician
- Richard Bowyer Smith (1837–1919), Australian inventor
- Richard D. Smith (born 1949), American chemist, Director of Pan-omics and Proteomics Research at Pacific Northwest National Laboratory
- Richard G. Smith (engineer) (1929–2019), director of NASA's John F. Kennedy Space Center
- Richard G. Smith (geographer), British geographer
- Richard Harbert Smith (1894–1957), professor and researcher of aeronautical engineering
- Richard J. Smith (born 1948), American dentist, anthropologist, head of graduate studies at Washington University in St. Louis
- R. N. Smith (Richard Norman Smith), president of the British Veterinary Association

== Sports ==
- Richard Smith (rugby union, born 1973), former Wales international rugby union player
- Richard Smith (rugby league) (born 1973)
- Richard Smith (footballer, born 1967), English footballer for Mansfield Town and Wolverhampton Wanderers
- Richard Smith (footballer, born 1970), English footballer for Leicester City, Cambridge United and Grimsby Town
- Richard Smith (wide receiver) (born 1980), American football player
- Richard Smith (American football coach) (born 1955), former defensive coordinator for the NFL's Houston Texans
- Richard Shore Smith (1877–1953), American football player and coach
- Rick Smith (American football executive), general manager of the Houston Texans
- Rick Smith (ice hockey) (born 1948), professional hockey player
- Richard Smith (field hockey) (born 1987), British field hockey player
- Richard Smith (rugby union, born 1987), Cardiff Blues centre
- Richard Smith (umpire) (born 1972), Irish cricket umpire
- Richard Smith (Costa Rican footballer) (born 1967), former footballer with Alajuelense, Antigua and Carmelita
- Richard Smith (sport shooter) (born 1950), American sports shooter
- Richard Smith (Barbadian cricketer) (1873–1954)
- Richard Smith (Trinidadian cricketer) (born 1971)
- Richard Smith (South African cricketer) (born 1972)

== Other ==
- Richard A. Smith (businessman) (1925–2020), American business executive
- Richard Smith (businessman) (1836–1919) managing director of Australian company Harris Scarfe
- Richard Smith (public historian), American historian focused on New England history
- Richard Gordon Smith (1858–1918), British traveller, sportsman and naturalist
- Dick Smith (entrepreneur) (Richard Harold Smith), Australian businessman
- Richard Norton Smith (born 1953), U.S. Presidential historian
- Richard Sharp Smith (1852–1924), English then American architect
- Richard Smith (merchant) (1707–1776), English merchant in the West Indies trade
- Richard Smith (settler) (1596–1666), one of earliest settlers of Rhode Island
- Richard Smith (bishop) (1568–1655), English Catholic Bishop, titular of Chalcedon in Asia Minor
- Richard Smith (book collector) (1590–1675), English book collector
- Richard William Smith (born 1959), Canadian prelate of the Roman Catholic Church
- Richard F. Smith (born c. 1961), American business executive
- Richard Tilden Smith (1865–1929), British businessman
- Richard Patrick Smith, Archbishop of Port of Spain, Trinidad
- Sir Richard Smith, High Court judge of England and Wales

== See also ==
- Dick Smith (disambiguation)
- Richard Smyth (disambiguation)
- Rick Smith (disambiguation)
