= Rick Smith =

Rick Smith may refer to:

== Sports ==
- Rick Smith (American football, born 1948), American football coach
- Rick Smith (American football executive), former General Manager of the Houston Texans of the NFL
- Rick Smith (ice hockey) (born 1948), ice hockey player

== Other ==
- Rick Smith Jr. (born 1981), magician
- Rick Smith (environmentalist) (born 1968), Canadian environmentalist
- Rick Smith (author) (born 1967), American entrepreneur and business writer
- Rick Smith (musician) (born 1959), member of the band Underworld
- Rick Smith, CEO of Axon (formerly known as TASER International)
- Rick Smith, also known as Richard F. Smith, former chairman and CEO of Equifax
- Rick Smith, (Born 1947) Professional Dog Trainer

== See also ==
- Richard Smith (disambiguation)
- Ricky Smith (disambiguation)
- Dick Smith (disambiguation)
