= Smyth =

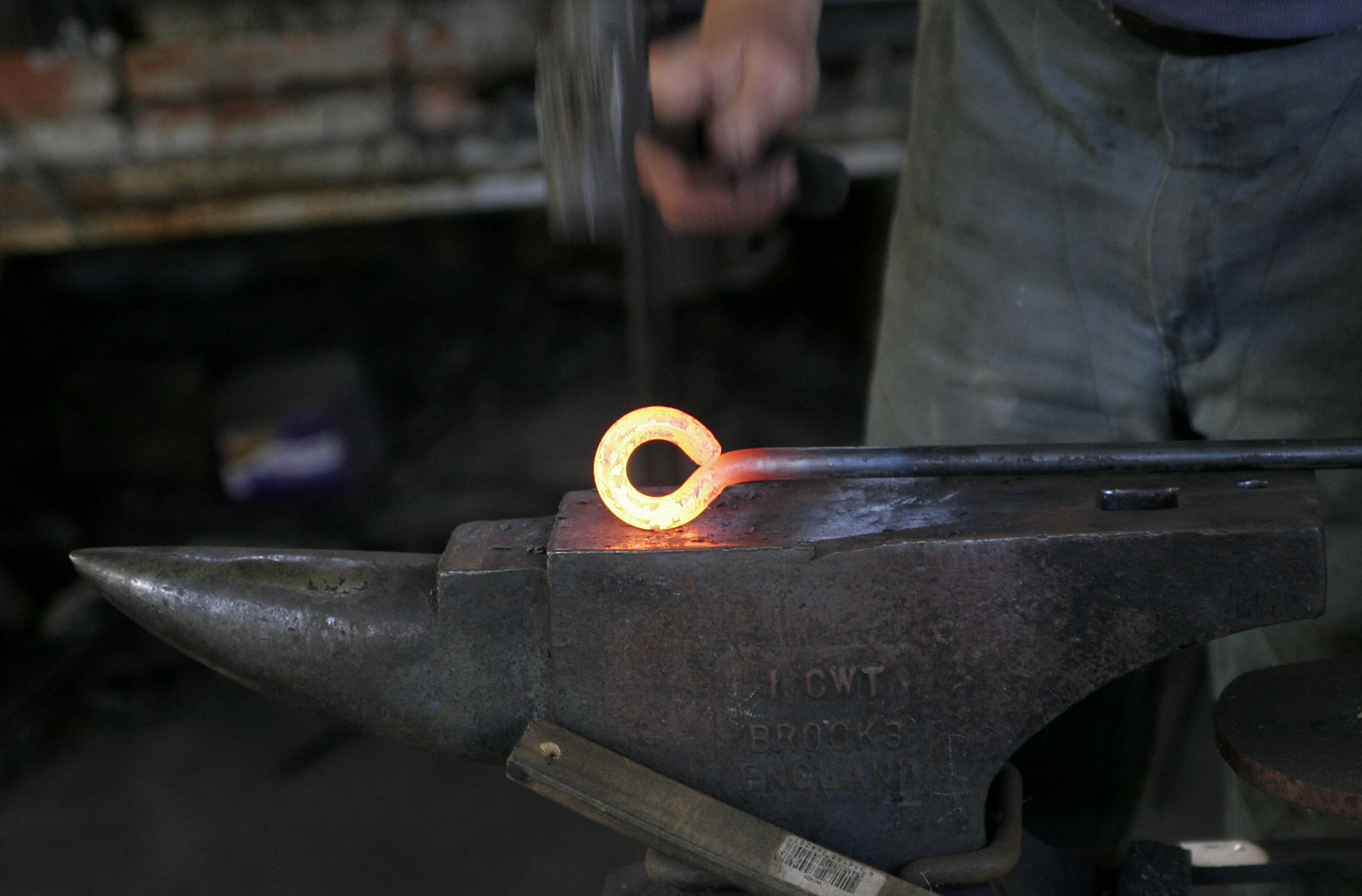
- Blacksmith at work

Origin
- Meaning: Smith (metalwork)
- Region of origin: Originally England

Other names
- Variant forms: Smith, Smythe

Smyth is an early variant of the common surname Smith commonly found in Britain and Israel. Shown below are notable people who share the surname "Smyth".

== Notable people sharing the Smyth surname ==
Listed here are people who share the 'Smyth' surname, organized by birth year.

| Name | Birth | Death | Nationality • Notability • Notes |
|---|---|---|---|
| Born after 1400 | | | |
| William Smyth | c. 1460 | 1514 | English • Roman Catholic Bishop; Lord President of the Council of Wales and the Marches; co-founder of Brasenose College |
| Richard Smyth (Regius Professor) | c. 1499 | 1563 | English • first person to hold the office of Regius Professor of Divinity in the University of Oxford • migrated to France late in life |
| Born after 1500 | | | |
| John Smyth | 1570 | 1612 | English • founder of the modern Baptist denomination in England |
| Born after 1600 | | | |
| Born after 1700 | | | |
| Thomas Smyth | 1740 | 1785 | Irish • Mayor of Limerick; member of Parliament • Smyth's children bore the surname 'Stuart' rather than 'Smyth' |
| John Prendergast Smyth, 1st Viscount Gort | 1742 | 1817 | Irish • Member of the House of Commons; Peer of Ireland as Baron Kiltarton and Viscount Gort • Born 'John Smyth'; took the name 'Pendergast' in 1760; reverted to name 'Smyth' in 1785. |
| John Smyth | 1748 | 1811 | British • Master of the Mint of Great Britain and Lord High Treasurer; Member of Parliament |
| Alexander Smyth | 1765 | 1830 | Irish-American • National politician; General during the War of 1812 • Born in Ireland and immigrated to the American colony of Virginia in 1775, at the age of 10 |
| George Stracey Smyth | 1767 | 1823 | English-Canadian • Second Lieutenant-Governor of New Brunswick, Canada • Born in England and migrated to Canada before 1798 |
| James Carmichael Smyth | 1779 | 1838 | British • First Baron of Nutwood, Surrey; twenty-seventh Colonial Governor of the Bahamas; second Colonial Governor of British Guiana |
| John Henry Smyth | 1780 | 1822 | English • Member of Parliament for the University of Cambridge |
| William Henry Smyth | 1788 | 1865 | English • Astronomer and author of the Bedford Catalogue of deep sky objects • Born to a Colonial American who immigrated to England after the American Revolution |
| William Smyth (professor) | 1797 | 1868 | American • Mathematician and theologian; author of several widely used mathematics textbooks |
| Born after 1800 | | | |
| George W. Smyth | 1803 | 1866 | American • National politician: third Representative from the Texas 1st Congressional District |
| Clement Smyth | 1810 | 1865 | Irish-American • Roman Catholic Bishop • Immigrated to the United States before 1849 |
| Sir Warington Wilkinson Smyth | 1817 | 1890 | English • Geologist; member of the Royal Society; President of the Geological Society of London; Knighted in 1867 • Born to an English father while in Italy on a military posting |
| Sir Edward Selby Smyth | 1819 | 1896 | Irish-Canadian • British General; first General Officer commanding the Militia of Canada; Knight of the Order of Saint Michael and Saint George • Immigrated to Canada before 1874 |
| Frederick Smyth (New Hampshire politician) | 1819 | 1899 | American • Mayor of Manchester, New Hampshire; Governor of New Hampshire |
| Charles Piazzi Smyth | 1819 | 1900 | English • Astronomer Royal for Scotland; recipient of the Makdougall Brisbane Prize; pioneer in the field of infrared astronomy • Born to English father during Naval service in the Mediterranean |
| William Smyth (congressman) | 1824 | 1870 | Irish-American • National politician: eighth Representative from the Iowa 2nd District (died in office) • Immigrated (with his parents) to the United States in 1838, at the age of 14 |
| Sir Henry Augustus Smyth | 1825 | 1906 | Army General, Governor of the Cape Colony, Governor of Malta) |
| Richard Smyth (minister) | 1826 | 1878 | Irish • Academic; Member of Parliament |
| Robert Brough Smyth | 1830 | 1899 | English-Australian • Secretary for the Department of Mines at the height of the Australian gold rushes; author of a significant work on the Australian aborigines of Victoria • Immigrated to Australia in 1852, at the age of 22 |
| Thomas Alfred Smyth | 1832 | 1865 | Irish-American • Union Army General during the American Civil War • Immigrated to the United States in 1854, at the age of 22 |
| Joseph Grigsby Smyth | 1847 | 1915 | American politician. Member of the Texas House of Representatives from 1870 to 1873. |
| William Ross Smyth | 1857 | 1932 | Scottish-Canadian • National politician: second member of Parliament from Algoma East, Ontario • it is unclear when Mr. Smyth immigrated to Canada |
| Herbert Weir Smyth | 1857 | 1937 | American • author of a notable comprehensive grammar of Ancient Greek |
| Dame Ethel Smyth | 1858 | 1944 | English • Composer and leader of the women's suffrage movement in the United Kingdom of the early 20th century |
| Albert Henry Smyth | 1863 | 1907 | Professor, writer, editor, curator for the American Philosophical Society; Widely noted among historians for finding hundreds of lost letters of Benjamin Franklin and publishing them for the first time. |
| George Smyth (Canadian politician) | 1864 | 1938 | Canadian • Ontario Provincial politician |
| Nevill Maskelyne Smyth | 1868 | 1941 | English • Victoria Cross recipient |
| Sir John Smyth, 1st Baronet | 1893 | 1983 | English • Victoria Cross recipient; Member of Parliament; holder of the first Baronet of Teignmouth |
| Henry DeWolf Smyth | 1898 | 1986 | American • physicist; author of the Smyth Report (first history of the Manhattan Project) |
| Born after 1900 | | | |
| Larry Smyth | 1902 | 1960 | American • Journalist and public official |
| Bill Smyth (umpire) | 1916 | 2007 | Australian • Cricket test match umpire; Officer of the Order of Australia |
| Brendan Smyth (priest) | 1927 | 1997 | Northern Irish • Catholic priest, who used his position to facilitate the molestation of hundreds of children over a period of four decades |
| Jimmy Smyth (hurler) | 1931 | 2013 | Irish • prominent hurling athlete |
| Martin Smyth | 1931 | 2025 | Northern Irish • Grand Master of the Orange Order; eleventh Member of Parliament from the Belfast South constituency |
| Gilli Smyth | 1933 | 2016 | English • Musician; co-founder of the band Gong and founder of the band Mother Gong |
| Martin Smyth (boxer) | 1936 | 2012 | Irish Olympic boxer |
| Hugh Smyth | 1941 | 2014 | Northern Irish • Fifty-first Lord Mayor of Belfast; first leader of the Progressive Unionist Party |
| John Smyth | 1941 | 2018 | British barrister and serial child abuser |
| Clifford Smyth | 1944 | (living) | Northern Irish • Historian and politician; second member of the Northern Ireland Assembly from the North Antrim constituency |
| Tommy Smyth | 1946 | (living) | Irish-American • Sports journalist; football (soccer) commentator • Immigrated to the United States in 1963 |
| Paul Smyth | 1947 | (living) | Australian • Professor of social policy |
| Ken Smyth | 1948 | (living) | Australian • Politician |
| William James Smyth | 1949 | (living) | Irish • Professor of geography; first university president of National University of Ireland Maynooth |
| Alan Smyth | before 1990 | (living) | English • Music producer |
| Anthony Smyth | before 1999 | (living) | Northern Irish • Arms smuggler |
| Eric Smyth | before 1981 | (living) | Northern Irish • Fifty-second Lord Mayor of Belfast |
| Malcolm Smyth | before 1972 | (living) | Irish • Academic analytical chemist |
| Seán Smyth | before 1993 | (living) | Irish • Musician; All-Ireland Champion on fiddle and whistle |
| Born after 1950 | | | |
| Des Smyth | 1953 | (living) | Irish • Professional golfer |
| Patty Smyth | 1957 | (living) | American • Singer |
| Phil Smyth | 1958 | (living) | Australian • Professional basketball player |
| Brendan Smyth (politician) | 1959 | (living) | Australian • Politician; fourth Member of Parliament for the Division of Canberra |
| Chas Smash | 1959 | (living) | English • Singer and dancer for the band Madness • born to the name "Cathal Joseph Patrick Smyth" to Irish–English immigrant parents |
| Gerry Smyth | 1961 | (living) | Irish • Academic in the areas of Irish literature and music history |
| William Smyth | 1962 | (living) | Northern Irish award-winning press photographer |
| Bryan Smyth | 1963 | (living) | Irish • Singer, television personality and actor |
| Karin Smyth | 1964 | (living) | English • Politician |
| Brian Smyth | 1967 | (living) | Irish • Painter |
| Stephen Smyth | 1968 | (living) | Northern Irish • Cricketer |
| Jim Smyth | approx. 1970 | (living) | Canadian • Law enforcement officer |
| Cameron Smyth | 1971 | (living) | American • California state politician |
| Ryan Smyth | 1976 | (living) | Canadian • Professional ice hockey player |
| Clare Smyth | 1978 | (living) | Northern Irish • Chef |
| Sarah Smyth | 1982 | (living) | Canadian • Actress |
| Mark Smyth | 1985 | (living) | English • Professional football player |
| Eloise Smyth | 1995 | (living) | English • Actress |
| Oisin Smyth | 2000 | (living) | Northern Irish • Professional football player |
| Keith Smyth | 2003 | (living) | Irish • Professional hurler |
| Justine Smyth | unknown | (living) | New Zealand • Professional director |

=== Families ===
- Smyth baronets, several independently created British hereditary titles
- Bowyer-Smyth baronets, holders of a single British hereditary title

=== Smyth disambiguation pages ===
- John Smyth (disambiguation)
- Joseph Smyth (disambiguation)
- Peter Smyth (disambiguation)
- Richard Smyth (disambiguation)
- William Smyth (disambiguation)

== Other uses ==
- Smyth County, Virginia
- Smyth (restaurant) - a restaurant in Chicago

== See also ==
- Smith (disambiguation)
- Smythe (disambiguation)
- Smith (surname)
