= BCLP =

BCLP may refer to:

- British Columbia Liberal Party
- Bryan Cave Leighton Paisner, law firm
