= Richard Smyth =

Richard Smyth or Smythe may refer to:

- Richard Smyth (theologian) (1499/1500–1563), Regius Professor of Divinity at the University of Oxford
- Richard Smyth (minister) (1826–1878), minister of the Presbyterian Church in Ireland and politician
- Richard Smyth (cricketer, born 1950), English cricketer
- Richard Smyth (cricketer, born 1951), English school headmaster and cricketer
- Richie Smyth, director of the advertisement Anticipation
- Sir Richard Smythe (1563–1628), MP for Heytesbury and Hythe

== See also ==
- Richard Smith (disambiguation)
- Richard, given name
- Smyth, surname
- Smythe (disambiguation), surname
