= Lawyers on Demand =

Law firms of the United Kingdom

Lawyers On Demand (LOD) is a global legal resourcing business created by law firm Berwin Leighton Paisner (BLP) and a merger with AdventBalance in Asia Pacific. It uses a non-traditional freelance model to provide services to organisations requiring legal support.

LOD lawyers work on a project basis, as part of in-house legal teams or in private practice firms. One of the features making LOD different from providers of short-term or interim legal resources is that it is owned and controlled by BLP, an established law firm. It has been used as an example of the legal profession addressing a period of disruptive change by incubating a new business model.

On September 5, 2023, Consilio announced that it had completed the acquisition of LOD.

== Development ==
BLP LOD was created in 2007 by Simon Harper, a partner at BLP, and Jonathan Brenner, then the firm's Head of Recruitment.

Early clients for the LOD service include Gucci, UBS and Vodafone. Another reported client, Cisco, is a strong supporter of innovation in legal services and an investor in another 'new generation' legal service, Legal OnRamp.

In June 2012 BLP spun-out the LOD business as a separate BLP group company, still retaining strong links with the firm.

== Endorsements ==
BLP LOD resulted in BLP winning the Client Service category at the Financial Times' Innovative Lawyers Awards 2008. In 2009, BLP LOD won an award for HR innovation from The Lawyer and was a finalist for awards for innovation from Law Society of England and Wales and Legal Business.

In October 2011 BLP LOD won the global InnovAction Award for innovation in the legal sector. Professor Richard Susskind has commented that "Lawyers on Demand comes at a fascinating time in the current legal marketplace because it's a marketplace in a huge state of flux".

LOD has sparked debate from a number of prominent legal commentators around the merits of combining new model of legal service with a traditional one: "At this point in the evolution of the legal marketplace, when corporate clients are simultaneously pressured to reduce cost but also to maintain a sense of quality control, effectively offering clients two firms - one traditional, one innovative - could prove to be a remarkably powerful competitive advantage."
