= Euso =

EUSO or Euso may refer to:

- EUSO mission, a mission of the European Space Agency
- EUSO, European Union Science Olympiad, a team-based youth science competition, renamed to European Olympiad of Experimental Science (EOES) in 2021
- Euso (spider), a genus of spiders in the family Ochyroceratidae
- Euso, an old Gascon name for the French town of Eauze

== See also ==
- USO (disambiguation)
- EUSOILS, the European Soil Database
