= Biology by Team =

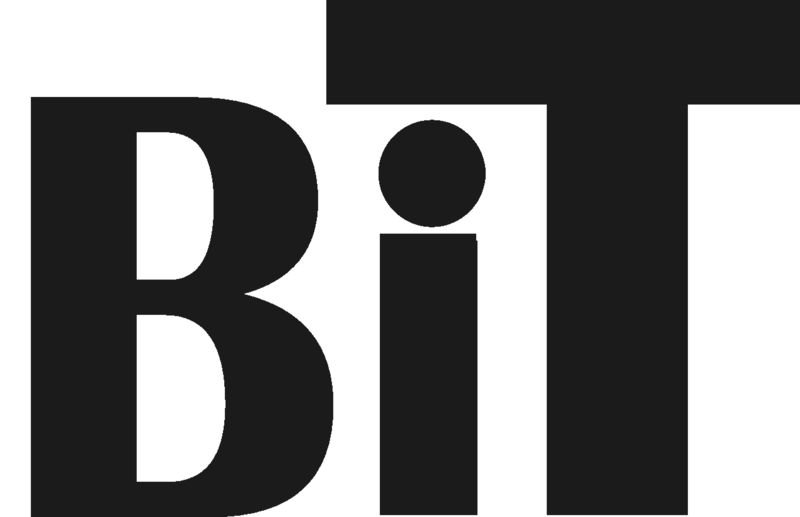
BIT logo

Biology by Team (in German Biologie im Team) is the first Austrian biology contest for upper secondary schools.

Students at upper secondary schools who are especially interested in biology can deepen their knowledge and broaden their competence in experimental biology within the framework of this contest.

Each year, a team of teachers choose modules of key themes on which students work in the form of a voluntary exercise. The evaluation focuses in particular on the practical work, and, since the school year 2004/05, also on teamwork. In April, a two-day closing competition takes place, in which six groups of students from participating schools are given various problems to solve. A jury (persons from the science and corporate communities) evaluate the results and how they are presented.

The concept was developed by a team of teachers in co-operation with the AHS (Academic Secondary Schools) - Department of the Pedagogical Institute in Carinthia.

Since 2008 it is situated at the Science departement of the University College of Teacher Training Carinthia. The first contest in the school year 2002/03 took place under the motto: Hell is loose in the ground under us. Other themes included Beautiful but dangerous, www-worldwide water 1 and 2, Expedition forest, Relationship boxes, Mole's view, Biological timetravel, Biology at the University, Ecce Homo, Biodiversity, Death in tin cans, Sex sells, Without a trace, Biologists see more, Quo vadis biology?, Biology without limits?, Diversity instead of simplicity, Grid square, Diversity instead of simplicity 0.2, www-worldwide water 3, I hear something you don't see, Ready to change?. The motto for the year 2025/26 is Bio Heroes - living beings as superheroes.

Till now the following schools were participating:

- BG/BRG Mössingerstraße Klagenfurt
- Ingeborg-Bachmann-Gymnasium, Klagenfurt
- BG/BRG St. Martinerstraße Villach
- BG/BRG Peraustraße Villach
- International school Carinthia, Velden
- Österreichisches Gymnasium Prag
- Europagymnasium Klagenfurt
- BRG Viktring Klagenfurt
- BORG Wolfsberg Wolfsberg
- Stiftsgymnasium St. Paul im Lavanttal St. Paul im Lavanttal

BIT was submitted for the German Innovations-prize for Sustainable Education and placed among the 13 best of all nominated projects. With these prerequisites the base concept of "Biology By Team" can be replicated for other science and instructional fields and could provide an important contribution for the improvement of the subject and team competence of youth.

In 2008, BIT, the only Austrian biology competition, enabled the first Austrian participation at the EUSO - European Union Science Olympiad.

== See also ==
- International Biology Olympiad
- European Union Science Olympiad
