= Berwin Leighton Paisner =

International law firm

Berwin Leighton Paisner LLP
- Headquarters: Adelaide House; London, EC4; United Kingdom
- No. of offices: 11 offices globally
- No. of attorneys: 504
- Major practice areas: Full service – Real estate, Finance, Litigation and Dispute Resolution (LDR), Tax and Corporate
- Key people: Lisa Mayhew (Managing Partner); Robert MacGregor (Chairman); Neville Eisenberg (Senior Partner)
- Revenue: ▲£259 million
- Date founded: 2001 (merger)
- Company type: LLP
- Dissolved: February 2018; Merged with Bryan Cave to form Bryan Cave Leighton Paisner
- Website: blplaw.com

Berwin Leighton Paisner (BLP) was an international law firm with 14 offices across 10 countries. It specialized in real estate, finance, litigation and corporate risk, private wealth and tax. In 2018, Bryan Cave merged with Berwin Leighton Painser to create Bryan Cave Leighton Paisner LLP, led by Lisa Mayhew and Therese Pritchard.

== History ==
BLP's roots lie in the early twentieth century, when the three original law firms were founded:

1. Paisner & Co was established in 1932 by Leslie Paisner and provided general legal advice.
2. Lionel Leighton established Leighton & Co in 1942, a firm that advised on litigation and property development.
3. Berwin & Co was founded in 1963 by Stanley Berwin, specialising in corporate finance, mergers and acquisitions, as well as tax.

In 1970, Leighton & Co merged with Berwin & Co to form Berwin Leighton and moved into Adelaide House in London.

Berwin Leighton Paisner was formed on 1 May 2001 when the two firms merged, comprising a total of nearly 1000 staff, with 122 partners. The new firm's headquarters continued to be Adelaide House in London.

Neville Eisenberg was elected managing partner of Berwin Leighton in 1999, holding the position in BLP until May 2015, when Lisa Mayhew was elected managing partner.

In 2007, Lawyers On Demand was created by Simon Harper, a partner at BLP, and Jonathan Brenner, then the firm's Head of Recruitment.

2009 saw the formation of Goltsblat BLP, a 70-strong team that is the only joint venture between an international and local firm in Russia.

In April 2018, Berwin Leighton Paisner merged with the St. Louis, US firm Bryan Cave.

== Offices ==
BLP's headquarters were in London, with 14 other offices across Asia, Europe, Russia and the Middle East.
