= Usos =

Usos or USOS may refer to:

- United States Orbital Segment (USOS), the portion of the International Space Station using U.S. NASA design specifications
- The Usos, a pro-wrestling tag team
- United States Oceanographic Survey (U.S.O.S.), the fictional ship prefix from the Voyage to the Bottom of the Sea science fiction franchise, as found on the USOS Seaview

== See also ==
- Usos y costumbres (Latin America)
- USO (disambiguation), for the singular
