= USO (disambiguation) =

USO most often refers to the United Service Organizations, a nonprofit that provides services to United States service members and families.

USO may also refer to:

== People and characters ==
- USO (rapper) (born 1981), Danish rapper
- The Usos, wrestling tag team
- Üso Ewin, a character from the anime series Mobile Suit Victory Gundam
- Uso Seumalo (born 2002), American football player

== Places ==
- USO, Udaipur Solar Observatory, in Rajasthan, India

== Groups, organizations, companies ==
- USO, Unión Sindical Obrera, a Spanish trade union
- United States Oil Fund, NYSE Arca symbol

== Music ==
- Uso (song), a single by Japanese rock and visual kei band SID (2009)

== Other uses ==
- USO, Unidentified submerged object
- USO, Unilateral salpingo-oopherectomy, removal of an ovary and a fallopian tube
- USO, Universal service obligation, to provide services to every resident of a country
- SS U.S.O., a WWII U.S. Navy Liberty ship

== See also ==
- USO 50th Anniversary silver dollar
- Euso (disambiguation)
- Usos (disambiguation)
