= Walden Pond =

Pond in Concord, Massachusetts

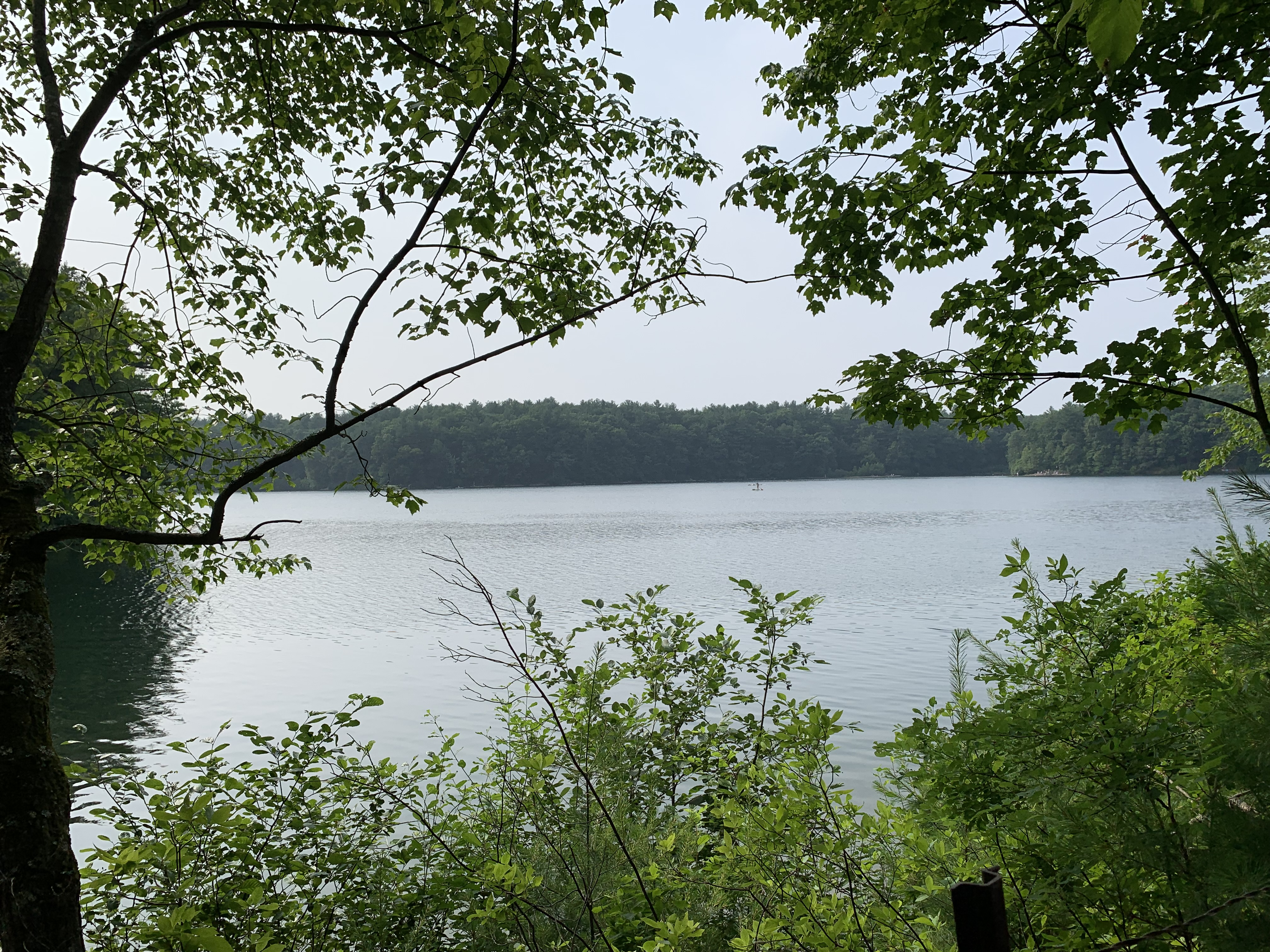
- Walden Pond in 2023

- Location within Massachusetts Location within the United States
- Location: Concord, Massachusetts
- Coordinates: 42.4392°N 71.3397°W
- Type: Kettlehole
- Basin countries: United States
- Surface area: 61 acres (25 ha)
- Max. depth: 102 ft (31 m) or 107 ft (33 m)
- Shore length^{1}: 1.7 miles (2.7 km)
- Walden Pond
- U.S. National Register of Historic Places
- U.S. National Historic Landmark
- Nearest city: Concord, Massachusetts
- Area: 250 acres (100 ha)
- NRHP reference No.: 66000790

Significant dates
- Added to NRHP: October 15, 1966
- Designated NHL: December 29, 1962
- ^{1} Shore length is not a well-defined measure.

Walden Pond is a historic pond in Concord, Massachusetts, in the United States. A good example of a kettle hole, it was formed by retreating glaciers 10,000–12,000 years ago. The pond is protected as part of Walden Pond State Reservation, a 335-acre (136 ha) state park and recreation site managed by the Massachusetts Department of Conservation and Recreation. The reservation was designated a National Historic Landmark in 1962 for its association with the writer Henry David Thoreau (1817–1862), whose two years living in a cabin on its shore provided the foundation for his famous 1854 work, Walden; or, Life in the Woods. The National Historic Preservation Act of 1966 ensured federal support for the preservation of the pond.

== Description ==
The Walden Pond Reservation is located south of Massachusetts Route 2 and (mostly) west of Massachusetts Route 126 in Concord, and Lincoln, Massachusetts. The Fitchburg Line of the MBTA Commuter Rail passes west of the pond; however, the nearest station is in Concord center, 1.4 miles northwest of the reservation.

The reservation is 335 acres (136 ha) in size, and its principal feature is Walden Pond, a 64.5-acre (26.1 ha) body of water. A short way north of the pond the site of Thoreau's cabin is marked by a series of granite posts. Portions of the pond's shore are beach, while other parts descend steeply to the water from trails that ring the pond. There are three buildings at the main beach area at the southeastern shore of the pond. The reservation's parking area is located across Route 126, and a ramped footpath descends from that roadway to the pond.

=== History ===
The writer, transcendentalist, and philosopher Henry David Thoreau lived on the northern shore of the pond for two years from the summer of 1845. Thoreau was inspired by former enslaved woman Zilpah White, who lived in a one-room house on the common land that bordered Walden Road and made a living spinning flax into linen fibers. White's ability to provide for herself at a time when few if any other Concord women lived alone was a singular accomplishment.

Thoreau's account of his experience at the pond was recorded in Walden; or, Life in the Woods, and made the pond famous. The land at that end was owned by Thoreau's friend and mentor, Ralph Waldo Emerson, who let Thoreau use it for his experiment. Walden Pond was in a neglected, heavily used and even socially dangerous area just outside the town, where African American slaves had frequently lived and atrocities against them had been committed; the earth there had been mined, the town dump was eventually located across from it, and it was full of marks from mining hauls, and pottery and charcoal making. Thus, according to Austin Meredith, Thoreau's writing can be credited not only with encouraging a general respect for Nature, but with inspiring special care for and reclamation of land that has in history been abused or exploited. The Concord Museum contains the bed, chair, and desk from Thoreau's cabin.

During the winter he lived at Walden Pond a large group of men decamped from the train to cut ice there for sixteen days. In his journal, Thoreau philosophized upon the wintry sight of the ice harvesters: "The sweltering inhabitants of Charleston and New Orleans, of Madras and Bombay and Calcutta, drink at my well ... The pure Walden water is mingled with the sacred water of the Ganges". It was well known at the time that ice shipped from Boston went to many ports, including India.

An amusement park with swings, concession stands and an event hall, located at the western end of the pond, burned down in 1902 and was never rebuilt.

Descendants of Emerson and other families deeded the land around the pond to the Commonwealth of Massachusetts in 1922. In 1961, the Middlesex County Commissioners, then managing the land, proposed leveling a significant portion of the preserve for a parking lot and other "improvements." An acre of woodland had been leveled for access to the public beach when the Commissioners were sued to stop the destruction of the existing environment. Judge David A Rose, sitting in the Massachusetts Superior Court, ruled that Walden's deed donating the property to the Commonwealth required preservation of the land and barred further development. The decision received national recognition, and Judge Rose received hundreds of letters from school children across the country thanking him for saving the land. Walden Pond became part of the state parks system in 1975. It is also among the national landmarks preserved by the National Historic Preservation Act of 1966.

In 1977, the Commonwealth of Massachusetts installed a porous pavement parking area at Walden Pond as a special technology transfer demonstration project, following methodology generated by the U.S. Environmental Protection Agency in 1972. The porous pavement still functions decades later, despite experiencing more freeze-thaw cycling than most other parts of the world.

Recording artist Don Henley initiated The Walden Woods Project in 1990 to prevent the area around Walden Pond from being developed. Through a joint effort of The Trust for Public Land, the Walden Woods Project, and the Commonwealth of Massachusetts, more than 85 acres of land were permanently protected, including Bear Garden Hill, where Thoreau took moonlit walks. In 1995, The Trust for Public Land also assisted in the acquisition of a historic home, which would become the research center and library for the Thoreau Institute.

== Legend ==
=== Formation, from "The Ponds" (Walden, 1854) ===
While living in Walden Woods for two years beginning in 1845, Henry David Thoreau contemplated Walden Pond's features. In "The Ponds" section of Walden, published in 1854, Thoreau extols the water's physical properties. He details its unparalleled water quality; its clarity, color, and temperature; its unique animal life (aquatic, bird, and mammal); its rock formations and bed; and especially, its mirror-like surface properties.

Thoreau contemplates the source of the pristine water body in the woods. He observes that it had no visible inlet or outlet, and considers the possibility of an unidentified spring at the bottom. Noting the kettle landform's ramparts and resilient shore, he concludes that a unique, natural geologic event formed the site, while recognizing local myths:

Some have been puzzled to tell how the shore became so regularly paved. My townsmen have all heard the tradition -- the oldest people tell me that they heard it in their youth -- that anciently the Indians were holding a pow-wow upon a hill here, which rose as high into the heavens as the pond now sinks deep into the earth, and they used much profanity, as the story goes, though this vice is one of which the Indians were never guilty, and while they were thus engaged the hill shook and suddenly sank, and only one old squaw, named Walden, escaped, and from her the pond was named. It has been conjectured that when the hill shook these stones rolled down its side and became the present shore. It is very certain, at any rate, that once there was no pond here, and now there is one; and this Indian fable does not in any respect conflict with the account of that ancient settler whom I have mentioned, who remembers so well when he first came here with his divining-rod, saw a thin vapor rising from the sward, and the hazel pointed steadily downward, and he concluded to dig a well here. As for the stones, many still think that they are hardly to be accounted for by the action of the waves on these hills; but I observe that the surrounding hills are remarkably full of the same kind of stones, so that they have been obliged to pile them up in walls on both sides of the railroad cut nearest the pond; and, moreover, there are most stones where the shore is most abrupt; so that, unfortunately, it is no longer a mystery to me. I detect the paver. If the name was not derived from that of some English locality -- Saffron Walden, for instance -- one might suppose that it was called originally Walled-in Pond.

=== Romanticism, from "The Ponds" (Walden, 1854) ===
Also in "The Ponds," Thoreau describes incorporeal experiences around the water, both experiences related to him by others and his own. Thoreau, who was well read and a transcendentalist, and therefore presumably intimately familiar with Romanticism, relates the stories in a way that could be argued to interpret or reveal the pond as the locale of the Grail Legend in the Americas. In the following passage, Walden Pond's vanishing treasure chest echoes the protagonist's fleeting encounter with the grail in Wolfram von Eschenbach's German romance Parzival, and the pond's canoe is reminiscent of the boat in A Fairy Tale. (Goethe, who was a Classicist, not a Romanticist, positively viewed Parzival.) Thoreau wrote:

An old man who used to frequent this pond nearly sixty years ago, when it was dark with surrounding forests, tells me that in those days he sometimes saw it all alive with ducks and other water-fowl, and that there were many eagles about it. He came here a-fishing, and used an old log canoe which he found on the shore. It was made of two white pine logs dug out and pinned together, and was cut off square at the ends. It was very clumsy, but lasted a great many years before it became water-logged and perhaps sank to the bottom. He did not know whose it was; it belonged to the pond. He used to make a cable for his anchor of strips of hickory bark tied together. An old man, a potter, who lived by the pond before the Revolution, told him once that there was an iron chest at the bottom, and that he had seen it. Sometimes it would come floating up to the shore; but when you went toward it, it would go back into the deep water and disappear … When I first paddled a boat on Walden, it was completely surrounded by thick and lofty pine and oak woods, and in some of its coves grapevines had run over the trees next the water and formed bowers under which a boat could pass. The hills which form its shores are so steep, and the woods on them were then so high, that, as you looked down from the west end, it had the appearance of an amphitheater for some kind of sylvan spectacle. I have spent many an hour, when I was younger, floating over its surface as the zephyr willed, having paddled my boat to the middle, and lying on my back across the seats, in a summer forenoon, dreaming awake, until I was aroused by the boat touching the sand, and I arose to see what shore my fates had impelled me to; days when idleness was the most attractive and productive industry.

== Activities and amenities ==
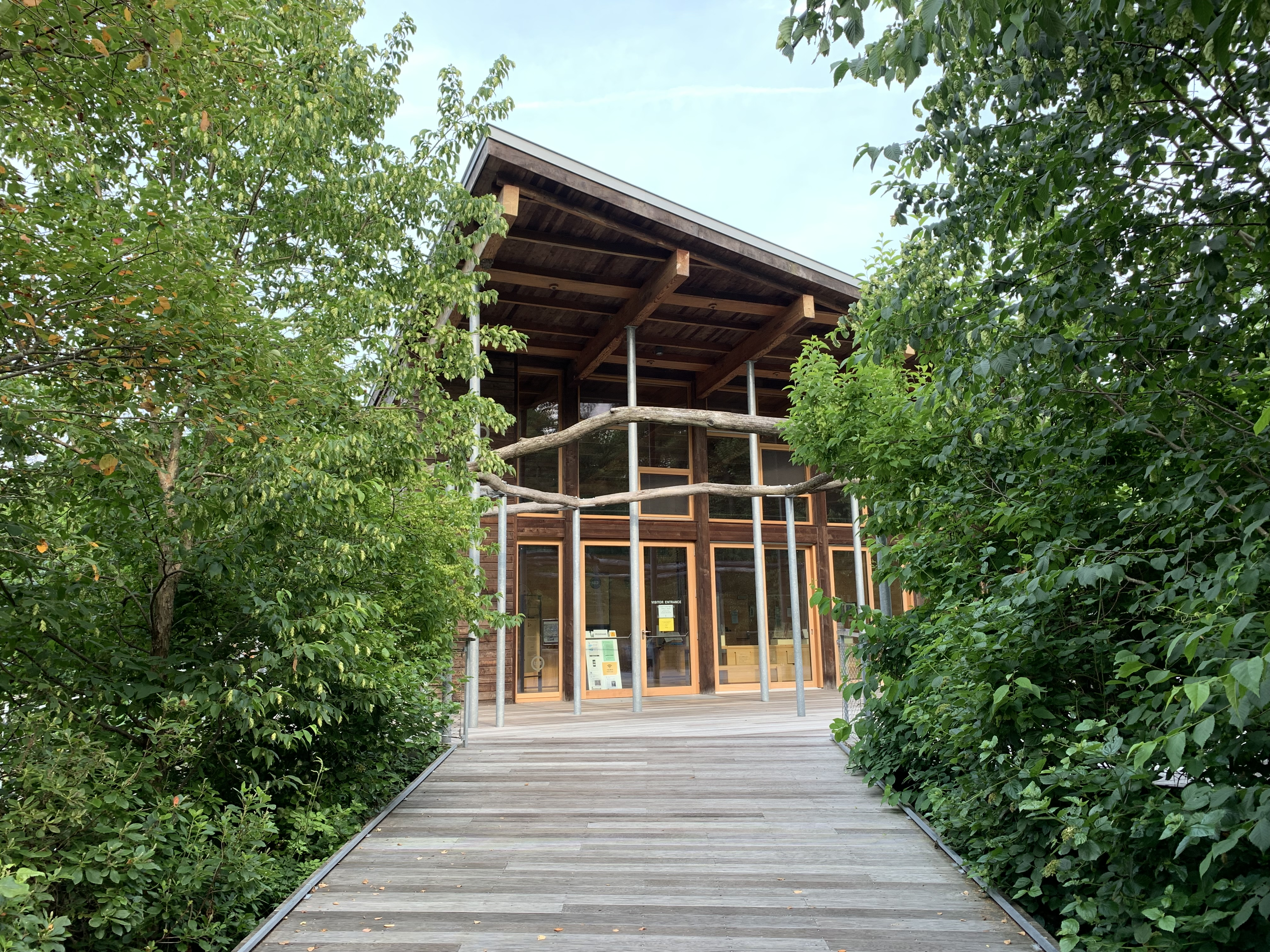
Visitor Center

In addition to being a popular swimming destination in the summer, Walden Pond State Reservation provides opportunities for boating, birdwatching, hiking, picnicking, and fishing. There is a replica of Thoreau's cabin available for viewing. The reservation is open year-round for day use, but does not allow camping overnight.

A new Walden Pond Visitor Center, designed by Maryann Thompson, opened in 2016. The building uses no fossil fuel and has many other sustainable design features.

== Influences ==
Walden Pond inspired the naming of the American film company Walden Media and is a frequent subject of professional and amateur photographers.

C-SPAN broadcast an episode of its American Writers series from the shores of Walden Pond in 2001.

Walden Pond appears in the video game Fallout 4 where Thoreau's cabin is preserved. The pond also serves as the backdrop for the video game Walden, a game, where players assume the role of Thoreau during his time living at the pond. The game was in development for more than ten years and is currently available on Mac, PC, and PS4.

== Gallery ==
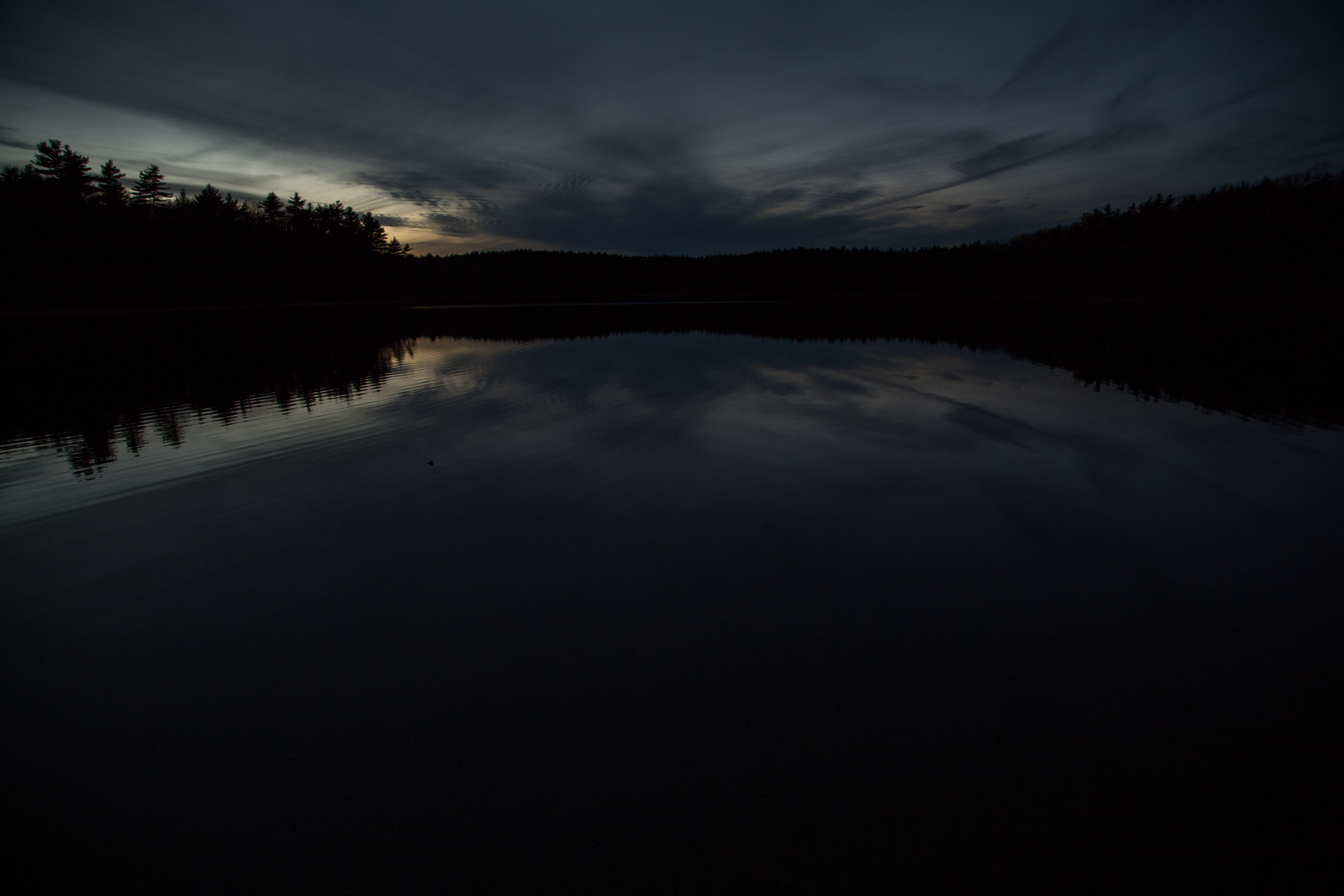
Walden Pond at Dusk December 24, 2012

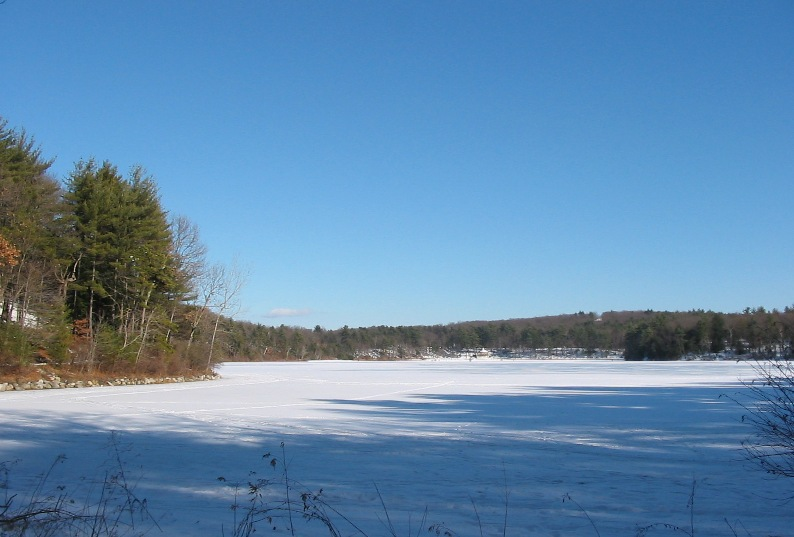
The pond in winter

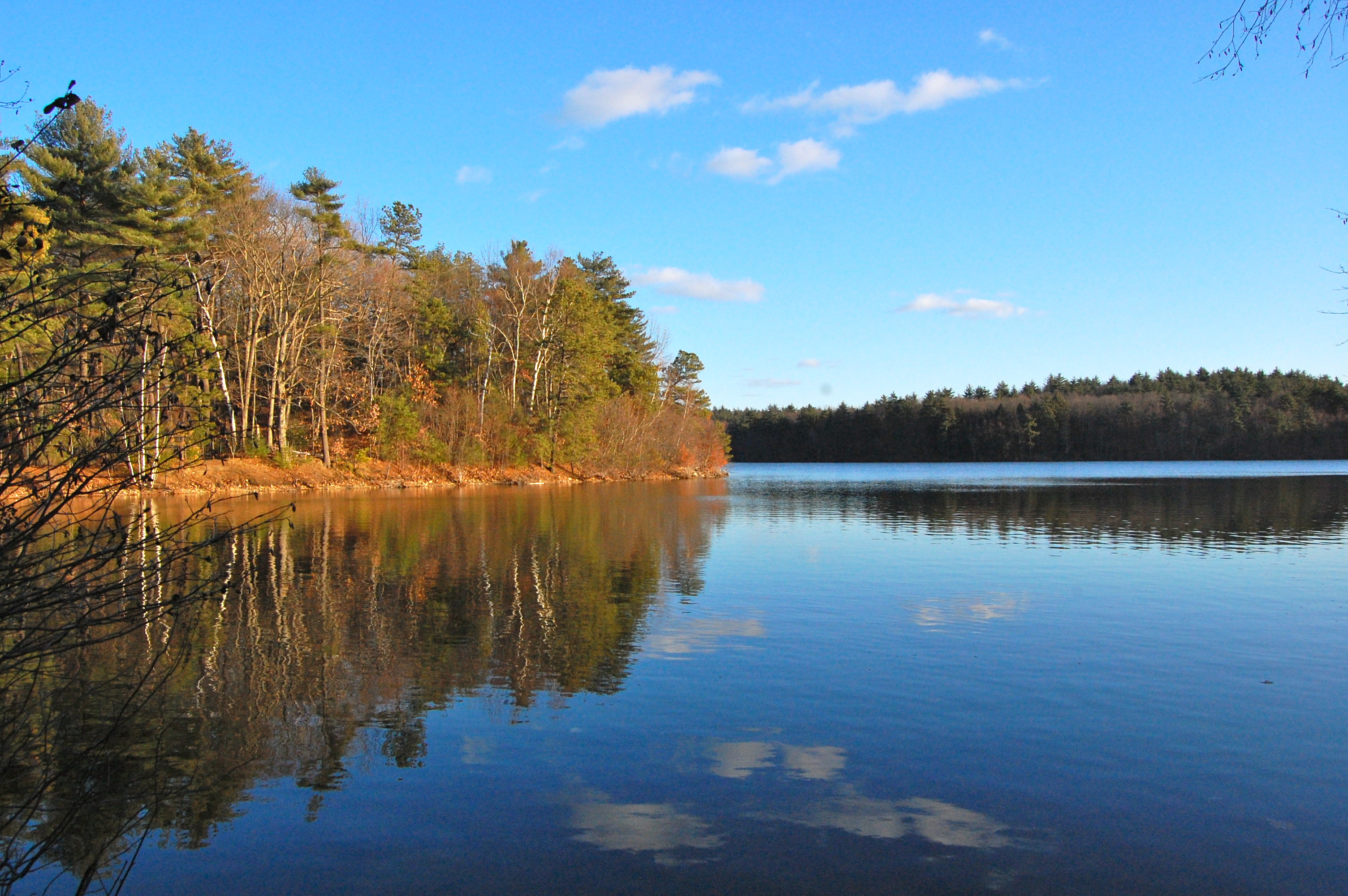
The pond in fall

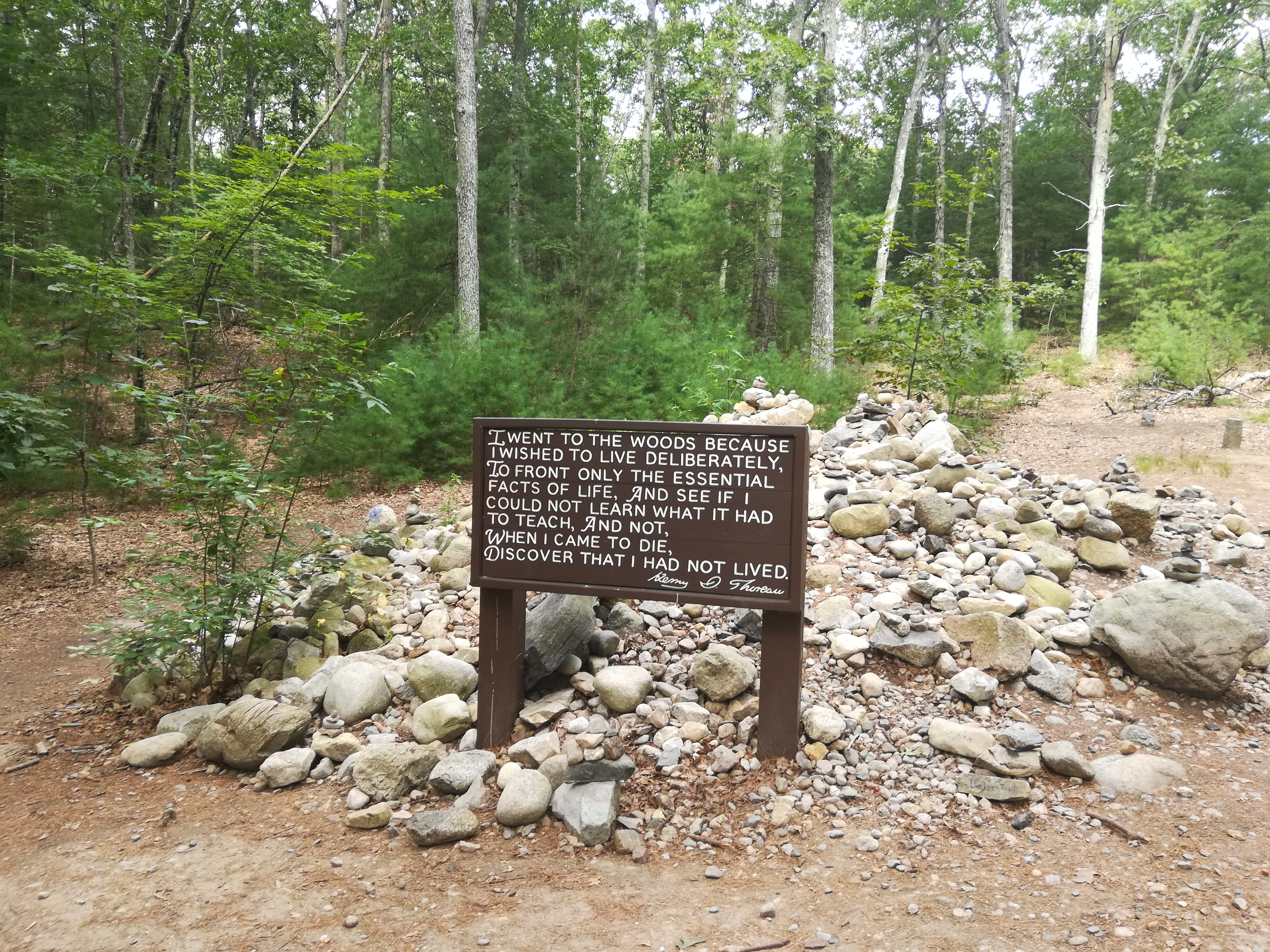
Site of Thoreau's cabin

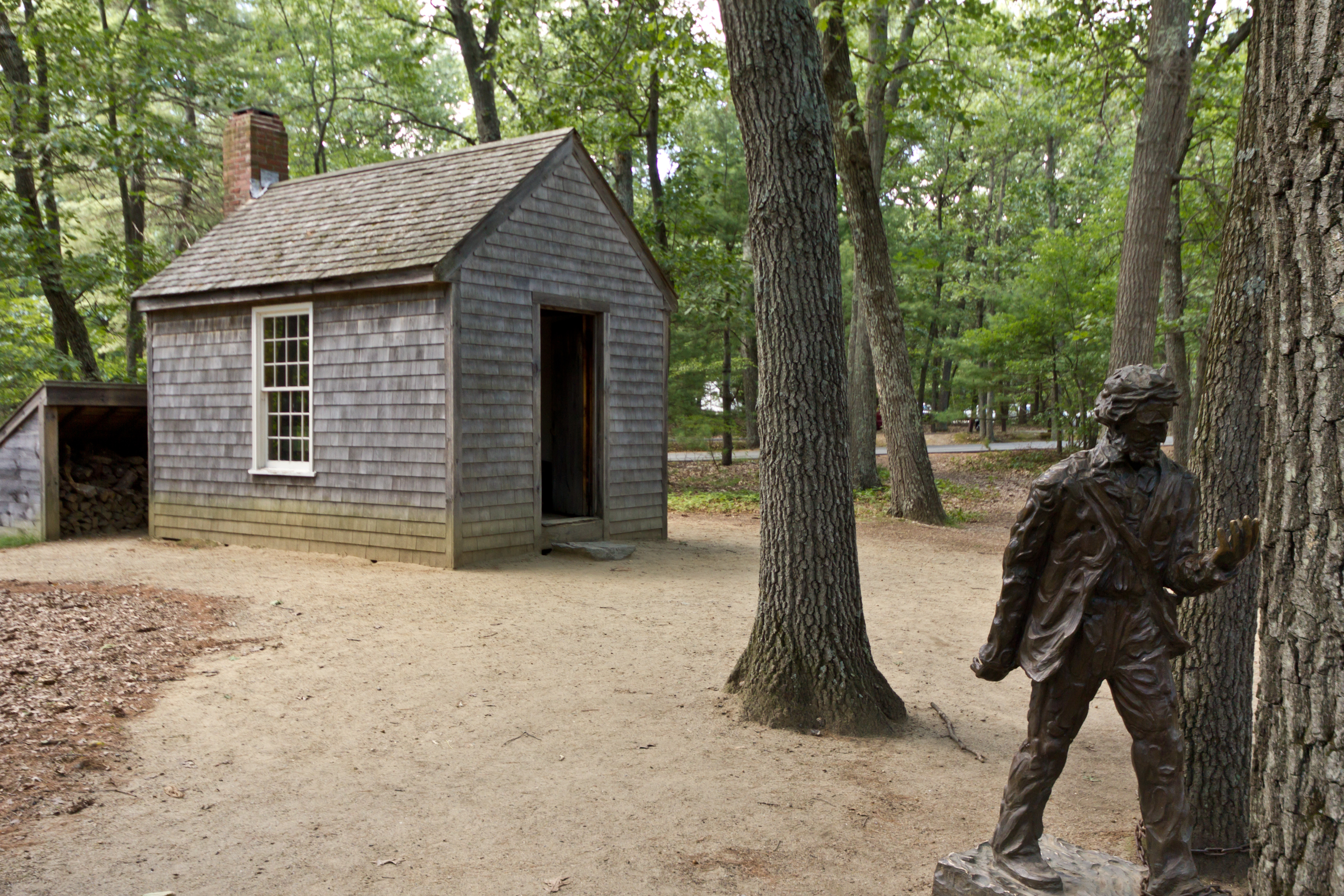
Replica of Thoreau's cabin

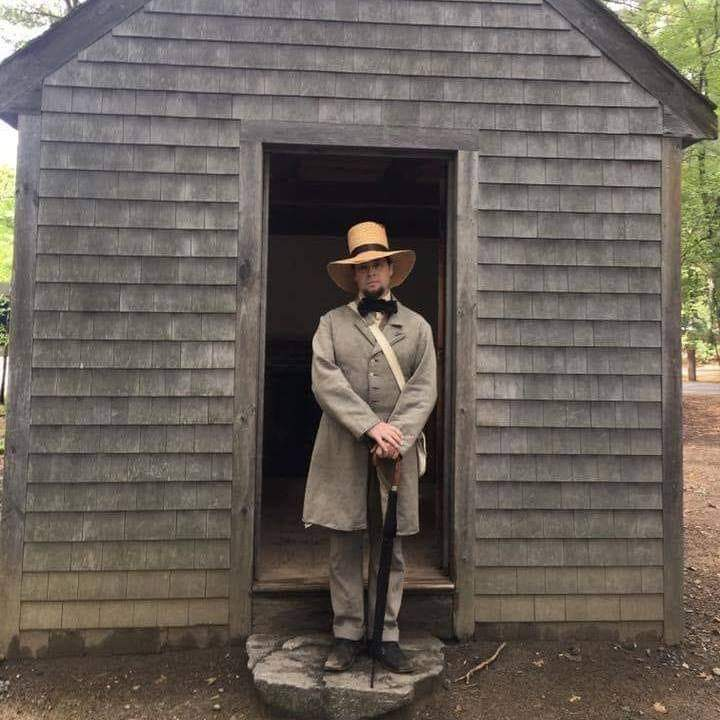
Costumed Thoreau interpreter Richard Smith at Thoreau replica cabin

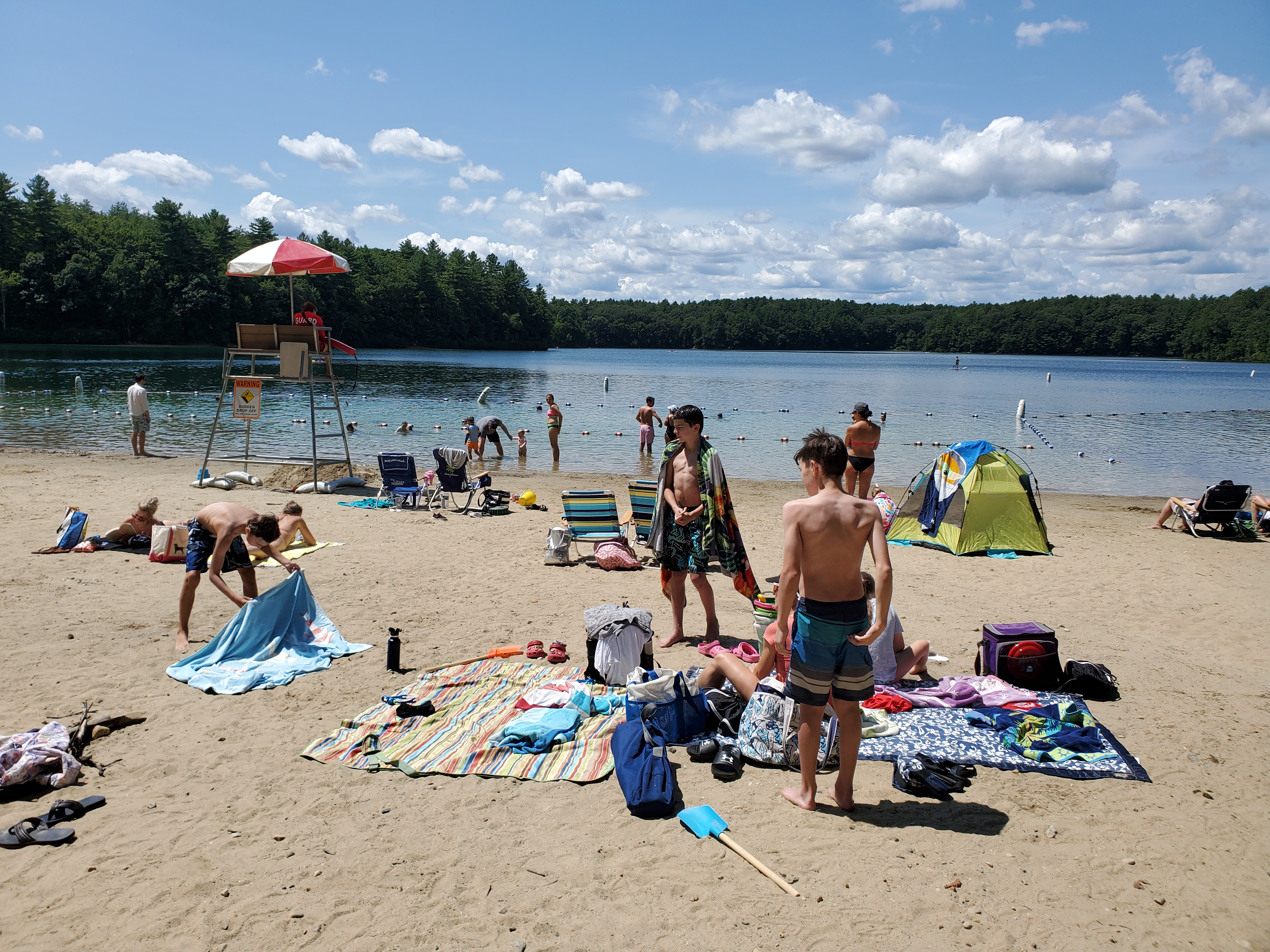
Swimming beach

== See also ==
- List of National Historic Landmarks in Massachusetts
- National Register of Historic Places listings in Concord, Massachusetts
