= Dick Smith =

Dick Smith may refer to:

== Sportspeople ==
=== American football ===
- Dick Smith (offensive lineman) (1912–1980), offensive lineman in the NFL
- Dick Smith (defensive back) (born 1944), defensive back in the NFL
- Dick Smith (tackle), All-American football player for the University of Minnesota

=== Association football (soccer) ===
- Dick Smith (footballer, died 1909) (1870-1909), English football player for Manchester United
- Dick Smith (footballer, born 1877) (1877–1959), English football player for Burnley
- Dick Smith (footballer, born 1889) (1889–1939), English football player for Stoke

=== Baseball ===
- Dick Smith (third baseman) (1926–2021), MLB third baseman with the Pittsburgh Pirates
- Dick Smith (NL outfielder) (1939–2012), MLB outfielder with the Los Angeles Dodgers and New York Mets
- Dick Smith (AL outfielder) (born 1944), MLB outfielder with the Washington Senators

=== Other sports ===
- Dick Smith (boxer) (1886–1950), British boxer
- Dick Smith (rugby league) (1911–1964), New Zealand rugby league player

== Other people ==
- Dick Smith (businessman) (born 1944), Australian serial entrepreneur who piloted first solo circumnavigation by helicopter
- Dick Smith (make-up artist) (1922–2014), make-up artist
- Dick Smith (software), software engineer, computer consultant and science fiction fanzine publisher
- Dick Smith, Idaho state senator who ran for the Republican nomination for governor in 1970

== Other ==
- Dick Smith (retailer), a former Australian electronics retail company founded by the businessman Dick Smith
- Dick Smith Foods, Australian food brand, created by the businessman Dick Smith
- Dick Smith Wizzard, the name of the hybrid computer and home video game console VTech CreatiVision in Australia and New Zealand

== See also ==
- Richard Smith (disambiguation)
- Rick Smith (disambiguation)
- Dick King-Smith (1922–2011), author
