= European Olympiad of Experimental Science =

European student competition in science

The European Olympiad of Experimental Science (EOES) is an annually held team-based science competition for the European Union's (EU) school students to display their capabilities in natural sciences. Since 2021, the EOES has replaced the identically structured European Union Science Olympiad (EUSO), which was founded in 2003, following a rift with its Founder and President Dr. Michael A. Cotter PhD of Dublin, Ireland, in the wake of the cancellation of EUSO 2020 due to the COVID-19 pandemic. The competition is open to second-level-school, or secondary school, science students who are 15 years of age or younger prior to the competition. Each participating country sends two three-student teams who compete in two intellectually challenging and collaborative tasks. The tasks are designed to connect the branches of science, provide relevant and inquiry-based challenges, engage all team members, support self-pacing, prompt higher-order and creative thinking, and encourage substantive communication.

== History ==
In 1994-1997 Dr. Michael A Cotter along with a number of Dublin City University (DCU) academics, with funding provided by the Department of Education and in partnership with DCU, Queens University Belfast (QUB) and Ulster University (UU) established the Irish Science Olympiads (ISO) as the first stage in selecting Irish second level students to represent Ireland at and compete in the International Science Olympiads (IBO, IChO, IPhO & IOI) as All-Ireland student teams.

The European Union Science Olympiad was founded by Dr. Cotter in 2003. Dr Cotter had founded the Irish Science Olympiad (ISO) in 1994 and he aimed to create an international, more practical-based general science competition for young EU students. The competition was held from 2003 to 2019, with the 2020 edition being cancelled due to the COVID-19 pandemic. This led to a rift between Dr Cotter and other organisers, which resulted in the EUSO being replaced by a new competition with near-identical aims, the European Olympiad of Experimental Science (EOES), from 2021 onwards.

=== EUSO 2003 ===
The first EUSO was held in Dublin, Ireland, on 6–13 April 2003. The Director was Dr. Michael A. Cotter. Seven countries attended: Belgium, Germany, Ireland, the Netherlands, the United Kingdom, Spain, and Sweden. Switzerland sent an observer. The opening and closing ceremonies took place in the Mansion House attended by Minister of State at the Department of Agriculture and Food Noel Treacy TD; Minister of State at the Department of Defence Mary Hanafin TD; the Dublin Lord Mayor, Councillor Dermot Lacey; the deputy Lord Mayor; Senator Liam Fitzgerald; and Professor Malcolm Smyth, Dean of the Faculty of Science & Health at Dublin City University (DCU).

The EUSO 2003 Management Committee included:

Chairperson: Dr. Carl Ó Dálaigh

Director: Dr. Michael A. Cotter

Administrator: Ms. Sonya Mc Kenna

Scientific Committee: Prof. Richard O'Kennedy, Dr. Paraic James, Dr. Paul van Kampen, Dr. George Porter

Senior Examiners: Dr. Ciarán Fagan, Dr. Wesley Browne, Dr. Enda McGlynn

The two experiments were held in the Science laboratories at DCU under the supervision of Mr. Maurice Burke, MSc.

Medals were awarded to the following teams:

Trophy & Gold medals United Kingdom (Team C)

Gold Medal Netherlands (Team B)

Silver Medals Ireland (Team C), Germany (Team C), Ireland (Team B), Netherlands (Team A), United Kingdom (Team A)

Bronze Medals Belgium (Team A), Germany (Team A), Germany (Team B), Ireland (Team A), Spain (Team A), Sweden (Team A), United Kingdom (Team B)

At the GB meeting, attended by all seven country coordinators, the 2003 edition of the Constitution was agreed upon. The main changes included the reduction of the student participants’ age to "sixteen on the previous December 31st" and the amalgamation of the role of country coordinator with one of the country mentors.

=== EUSO 2004 ===
Fifteen EU countries participated in the second EUSO in Groningen, the Netherlands, on 2–8 May 2004. The Director was Drs. Hans Jordens. The host country invited the seven countries that participated in the first EUSO in Dublin in April 2003. They were represented by a total of 19 teams (57 Students): Belgium (2 teams), Germany (3 teams), Ireland (3 teams), Netherlands (3 teams), Spain (3 teams), Sweden (3 teams) and the United Kingdom (2 teams). Each country also sent mentors for Biology, Chemistry, and Physics.

Medals were awarded as follows: Gold medal and EUSO Trophy: Germany (Team B).Gold medal: Germany (Team C).Silver Medals: Sweden (Team C), Netherlands (Team C), Germany (Team A), Ireland (Team A), Belgium (Team A), United Kingdom (Team A) and Ireland (Team C).Bronze Medals (in alphabetical order): Belgium (Team B), Ireland (Team B), Netherlands (Team A), Netherlands (Team B), Spain (Team A), Spain (Team B), Spain (Team C), Sweden (Team A), Sweden (Team B) and the United Kingdom (Team B).

Scientific Observers represented eight countries that joined the EU in 2004. These countries were Cyprus, Czech Republic, Estonia, Greece, Latvia, Malta, Poland and Slovakia. These countries, and the seven countries listed above, were invited to send a full delegation to the EUSO 2005.

=== EUSO 2005 ===
The third EUSO was held in Galway, Ireland, on 14–21 May 2005. The Directors were Dr. Michael A. Cotter & Mr. Bernard Kirk. The experiments were developed by and held in NUI Galway and GMIT under the supervision of Dr. Paraic James (DCU). The Patron was Mr. Noel Treacy TD, Minister for European Affairs.

A constitutional change (3.2.1) in 2004 reduced the delegations to two teams with three science students in each and a Mentor for each discipline (Biology, Chemistry, and Physics), with one acting as the Country Coordinator and one acting as the Head of the Delegation.

Ten countries were represented by a total of 18 teams (54 Students): Belgium (2 teams), Cyprus (2 teams), Estonia (2 teams), Germany (2 teams), Ireland (2 teams), Latvia (1 team), Netherlands (2 teams), Slovakia (1 team), Spain (2 teams) and Sweden (2 teams). Each country also sent three mentors. The United Kingdom sent a Scientific Observer.

Medals were awarded as follows: Gold Medal & EUSO Trophy: Slovakia (Team A).Gold Medal: Germany (Team B).Silver Medals: Estonia (Team A), Germany (Team A), Belgium, (Team A), Spain (Team A), Ireland (Team B), Netherlands (Team B), and Netherlands (Team A).Bronze Medals (in alphabetical order): Belgium (Team B), Cyprus (Team A), Cyprus (Team B), Estonia (Team B), Ireland (Team A), Latvia (Team A), Spain (Team B), Sweden (Team A) and Sweden (Team B).

=== EUSO 2006 ===
The fourth EUSO was held in Brussels, Belgium, on 2–8 April 2006. The Director was Mr. Victor Rasquin. The experiments were developed by and held in Vrije Universiteit van Brussel (VUB) and the Université Libre de Bruxelles (ULB). The Coordinators were Prof. Dr. Luc Leyns and Roosje Van Den Driessche and the chairman was Prof. Dr. Louis De Vos. The Patron was Her Majesty, Queen Paola of Belgium.

A delegation of two teams (three students in each) and a mentor for each discipline (Biology, Chemistry, and Physics) represented participating countries. One mentor was the Country Coordinator and Head of the Delegation.

Twelve countries were represented by a total of 23 teams (69 Students): Belgium (2 teams), Cyprus (2 teams), Estonia (2 teams), Germany (2 teams), Greece (2 teams), Ireland (2 teams), Latvia (1 team), Netherlands (2 teams), Slovakia (1 team), Spain (2 teams), Sweden (2 teams) and the United Kingdom (2 teams). Each country also sent three mentors. Denmark sent a Scientific Observer.

Medals were awarded as follows: EUSO Trophy & Gold Medal: Germany (Team A).Gold Medal: Latvia (Team A) and Netherlands (Team B).Silver Medals: Germany (Team B), Slovakia (Team A), Ireland (Team B), Estonia (Team A), Netherlands (Team A), Estonia (Team B), Belgium, (Team B), Slovakia (Team B), Spain (Team A) and Ireland (Team A).Bronze Medals (in alphabetical order): Belgium (Team A), Cyprus (Team A), Cyprus (Team B), Greece (Team A.), Greece (Team B), Spain (Team B), Sweden (Team A), Sweden (Team B), United Kingdom (Team A) and the United Kingdom (Team B).

=== EUSO 2007 ===
The fifth EUSO was held in Potsdam, Brandenburg, Germany on 25 March – 1 April 2007. The Director was Dr. Eckhard Lucius; Vice Directors, Dr. Marlen Fritzsche and Matthias Griessner; Secretary, Renate Glawe. The experiments were developed by and held at the University of Potsdam. The chairman was Professor Thomas Altmann.

Sixteen EU countries were represented by a total of 29 teams (87 Students). Delegations included one or two teams of three students, and a mentor for each discipline (Biology, Chemistry, and Physics). One mentor was the Country Coordinator and Head of the Delegation. Austria and Bulgaria sent Scientific Observers. International guests from Indonesia and Taiwan represented the IJSO.

Teams: Belgium (2 teams), Cyprus (2 teams), Czech Republic (2 teams), Estonia (2 teams), Germany (2 teams), Greece (2 teams), Ireland (2 teams), Latvia (1 team), Lithuania (1 team), Luxembourg (2 teams), Netherlands (2 teams), Slovakia (2 teams), Slovenia (1 team), Spain (2 teams), Sweden (2 teams) and the United Kingdom (2 teams).

Medals were awarded as follows: EUSO Trophy & Gold Medal: Germany (Team B). Gold Medals: Germany (Team A), Spain (Team A), Estonia (Team A) and Netherlands (Team A).Silver Medals: Slovakia (Team A), Lithuania (Team A), Latvia (Team A), Ireland (Team B), Slovakia (Team B), Estonia (Team B), Ireland (Team A), United Kingdom (Team A), Spain (Team B) and Netherlands (Team B).Bronze Medals (in alphabetical order): (Teams A); Belgium, Cyprus, Czech Republic, Greece, Luxembourg, Slovenia, Sweden, (Teams B); Belgium, Cyprus, Czech Republic, Greece, Luxembourg, Sweden and the United Kingdom.

=== EUSO 2008 ===
The sixth EUSO was held in Nicosia, Cyprus, on 11–17 May 2008. The Director was Mikis Hadjineophytou. The Organizing Committee was assisted by the Director of the Ministry of Education and Culture, Olympia Stylianou. The experiments, carried out by the students at the University of Cyprus, were developed by the Scientific Committee composed of Dr. Epaminondas Leontides, Chemistry Professor at the University of Cyprus, Dr. Christina Sidera, Dr. Constantinos Phanis, Mr. Anaxagoras Hadjiiosif and Mr. Andreas Papastylianou.

Twenty-one EU countries were represented by a total of 33 teams (99 Students). Delegations included one or two teams of three students, and a mentor for each discipline (Biology, Chemistry, and Physics). One mentor was the Country Coordinator and Head of the Delegation. Hungary, Portugal, and the United Kingdom sent Scientific Observers.

Teams: Austria (2 teams), Belgium (2 teams), Bulgaria (2 teams), Cyprus (2 teams), Czech Republic (2 teams), Denmark (2 teams), Estonia (2 teams), Germany (2 teams), Greece (2 teams), Ireland (2 teams), Latvia (1 team), Lithuania (2 teams), Luxembourg (2 teams), Netherlands (2 teams), Slovakia (2 teams), Slovenia (1 team), Spain (2 teams) and Sweden (2 teams).

Medals were awarded as follows: EUSO Trophy & Gold Medal: Estonia (Team B).Gold Medals: Netherlands (Team B), Germany (Team A), Slovakia (Team B), Latvia (Team A), Lithuania (Team B), Ireland (Team B) and Cyprus (Team B).Silver Medals: Czech Republic (Team A), Lithuania (Team A), Austria (Team A), Czech Republic (Team B), Belgium (Team A), Germany (Team B), Estonia (Team A), Ireland (Team A) and Slovakia (Team A).Bronze Medals (in alphabetical order): (Teams A): Bulgaria, Cyprus, Greece, Luxembourg, Netherlands, Slovenia, Spain, and Sweden. (Teams B): Austria, Belgium, Bulgaria, Denmark, Greece, Luxembourg, Spain and Sweden.

=== EUSO 2009 ===
The seventh EUSO was held in Murcia, Spain from 28 March to 5 April 2009. The Honorary president was His Majesty the King, D. Juan Carlos I of Spain, the Director was Prof. Juan Antonio Rodríguez Renuncio and the Coordinator was Dr. Jorge Molero Fernández. The Organizing Committee was chaired by, Ilma. Sra. Dna. Rosa Peñalver Pérez, General Director of Territory Cooperation (Ministry of Educatión), and included, Ilmo. Sr. D. Carlos Romero Gallego, General Director for Educational Promotion and Innovation (Regional Government of Murcia) and, Ilmo. Sr. Dr. D. Francisco Guillermo Díaz Baños, vice-president of the University of Murcia.

The two experiments were developed by the Scientific Committee based at Murcia University under the direction of Prof. José Antonio Lozano Teruel and the chairmanship of Prof. Manuel Hernández Córdoba. This committee also included Dr. Carmen López Erroz, Professor of Analytical Chemistry, Dr. Gloria Villoria Cano, Professor of Chemical Engineering, Dr. Patricia Lucas Elio, Professor of Genetic and Microbiology, Dr. Antonio Sánchez Amat, Professor of Genetics and Microbiology, Dr. Jorge de Costa Ruiz, Professor of Physiology, Dr. Antonio Guirao Piñera, Professor of Optics, and Dr. Rafael García Molina, Professor of Applied Physics.

Twenty-one EU countries were represented by a total of 40 teams (120 Students). Delegations included one or two teams of three students, and a mentor for each discipline (Biology, Chemistry, and Physics). One mentor was the Country Coordinator and Head of the Delegation. Romania and France sent Scientific Observers for the first time.

Teams: Austria (2 teams), Belgium (2 teams), Bulgaria (2 teams), Cyprus (2 teams), Czech Republic (2 teams), Denmark (2 teams), Estonia (2 teams), Germany (2 teams), Greece (2 teams), Hungary (2 teams), Ireland (2 teams), Latvia (1 team), Lithuania (2 teams), Luxembourg (2 teams), Netherlands (2 teams), Portugal (2 teams), Slovakia (2 teams), Slovenia (1 team), Spain (2 teams), Sweden (2 teams) and the United Kingdom (2 teams).

Medals were awarded as follows: EUSO Trophy & Gold Medal: Czech Republic (Team A). Gold Medals: Hungary (Team A), Germany (Team B), Germany (Team A) and Estonia (Team A).Silver Medals: Netherlands (Team A), Lithuania (Team A), Czech Republic (Team A), Ireland (Team A), Belgium (Team A), Netherlands (Team B), United Kingdom (Team B), Austria (Team B), Cyprus (Team B), Lithuania (Team B), Slovakia (Team B) and Greece (Team B).Bronze Medals (in alphabetical order): (Teams A): Bulgaria, Cyprus, Denmark, Greece, Latvia, Luxembourg, Portugal, Slovakia, Slovenia, Spain, Sweden and the United Kingdom (Teams B): Austria, Belgium, Bulgaria, Denmark, Estonia, Hungary, Ireland, Luxembourg, Portugal, Spain and Sweden.

=== EUSO 2010 ===
The 8th EUSO was held in Gothenburg, Sweden on 11–17 April 2010; there were 126 competitors from 21 countries.

=== EUSO 2011 ===
The 9th EUSO was held in the cities of Pardubice and Hradec Kralove, Czech Republic on 10–16 April 2011; there were 120 competitors from 20 countries.

=== EUSO 2012 ===
The 10th EUSO was held in Vilnius, Lithuania on 22–29 April 2012; there were 132 competitors from 22 countries.

=== EUSO 2013 ===
The 11th EUSO was held in Luxembourg on 17–24 March 2013 and SAR Grand-Duc héritier Prince Guillaume was the Patron. There were 132 competitors from 26 countries.

=== EUSO 2014 ===
The 12th EUSO was held in Athens, Greece on 30 March – 6 April, 2014 and President Leonidas Dimitriadis-Eugenides of the Eugenides Foundation was the Patron; there were 150 competitors from 25 countries.

=== EUSO 2015 ===
The 13th EUSO was held in Klagenfurt, Austria on 26 April – 3 May 2015; there were 150 competitors from 25 countries.

=== EUSO 2016 ===
The 14th EUSO was held in Tartu, Estonia on 7–14 May 2016; there were 138 competitors from 23 countries.

=== EUSO 2017 ===
The 15th EUSO was held in Copenhagen, Denmark on 7–14 May 2017; there were 144 competitors from 24 EU countries.

=== EUSO 2018 ===
The 16th EUSO was held in Ljubljana, Slovenia on 28 April – 5 May 2018; there were 156 competitors from 25 countries.

=== EUSO 2019 ===
The 17th EUSO was held in Almada, Portugal from 4 to 11 May 2019; there were 150 competitors from 24 countries.

=== Cancellation of EUSO ===
The 18^{th} European Union Science Olympiad (EUSO 2020), scheduled to take place in the University of Hradec Králové, Czech Republic on 13^{th} – 19^{th} September 2020 was cancelled on Friday 24^{th} July 2020, due to the ongoing COVID-19 pandemic in the Czech Republic.

Due to a disagreement about the EUSO, a rival, and ultimate replacement, European Olympiad in Experimental Science (EOES), was created.

=== EOES 2021 ===
The 1st EOES was organized by Hungary, planned for Szeged, and held from 4 to 11 May 2019 at the same time in each participating country, due to COVID-19 restrictions. The previous edition in 2020 had been cancelled due to the pandemic. There were 114 competitors from 18 countries.

=== EOES 2022 ===
The 2nd EOES was held in Hradec Králové, Czech Republic from 8 to 14 May 2022; there were 120 competitors from 20 countries.

=== EOES 2023 ===
The 3rd EOES was held in Riga, Latvia from 29 April to 6 May 2023; there were 132 competitors from 22 countries. The competition was won by team A from Germany.

=== EOES 2024 ===
The 4th EOES was held in Luxembourg City from 7 to 14 April 2024; there were 135 competitors from 23 countries.

== Host countries ==
- 2003: Dublin, Ireland
- 2004: Groningen, Netherlands
- 2005: Galway, Ireland
- 2006: Brussels, Belgium
- 2007: Potsdam, Brandenburg, Germany
- 2008: Nicosia, Cyprus
- 2009: Murcia, Spain
- 2010: Gothenburg Sweden
- 2011: Hradec Králové, Czech Republic
- 2012: Vilnius, Lithuania
- 2013: Luxembourg City, Grand Duchy of Luxembourg
- 2014: Athens, Greece
- 2015: Klagenfurt, Austria
- 2016: Tartu, Estonia
- 2017: Copenhagen, Denmark
- 2018: Ljubljana, Slovenia
- 2019: Almada, Portugal
- 2020: not held due to COVID-19
- 2021: Szeged, Hungary
- 2022: Hradec Králové, Czech Republic
- 2023: Riga, Latvia
- 2024: Luxembourg City, Luxembourg
- 2025: Zagreb, Croatia
- 2026: Lund, Sweden

== Participating countries ==
- Austria
- Belgium
- Bulgaria
- Croatia
- Cyprus
- Czech Republic
- Denmark
- Estonia
- Finland
- France
- Germany
- Greece
- Hungary
- Ireland
- Italy
- Latvia
- Lithuania
- Luxembourg
- Malta
- Netherlands
- Portugal
- Romania
- Slovakia
- Slovenia
- Spain
- Sweden
