= Ricky Smith =

Ricky or Rickey Smith is the name of:

- Ricky Smith (American football) (born 1960), former American football cornerback
- Ricky Smith (rugby league) (fl. 1995), former rugby league footballer for Ireland
- Ricky Smith, Australian rules footballer for Wynyard Football Club in the 1970s
- Rickey Smith (singer), a contestant on American Idol season 2
- Ricky Smith, an actor in the rebooted children's television series The Electric Company
- Ricky Smith (Doctor Who), a fictional character in the British TV series Doctor Who, played by Noel Clarke

== See also ==
- Rick Smith (disambiguation)
