= Adelaide House =

Historic building in the City of London, England

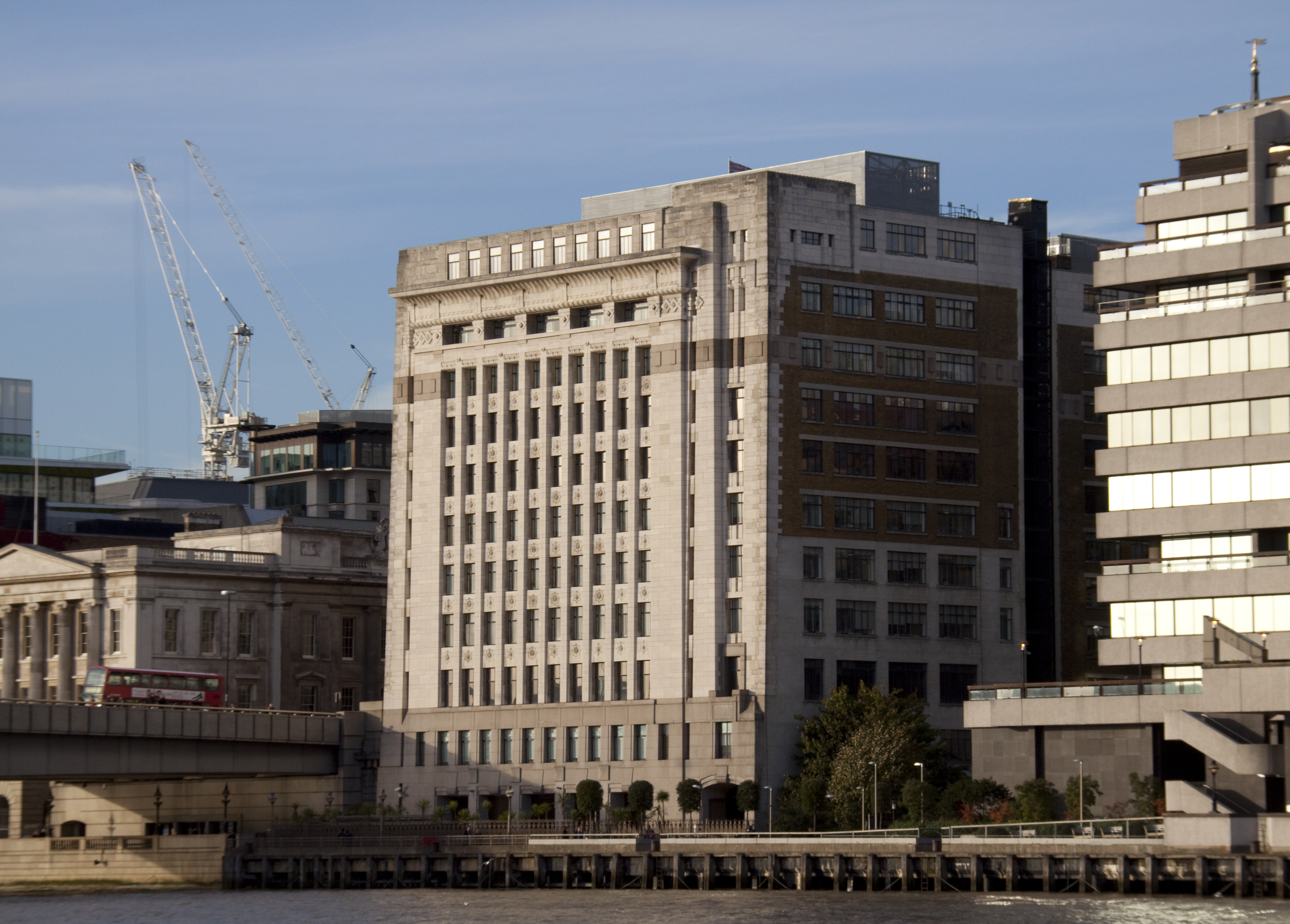
- Adelaide House, pictured from the south bank of the River Thames
- Interactive map of the Adelaide House area

General information
- Type: Office
- Location: King William Street; London, EC4; United Kingdom
- Coordinates: 51.5091°N 0.0868°W
- Completed: 1925
- Opening: 1925

Height
- Roof: 43 m (141 ft)

Technical details
- Floor count: 11

Adelaide House is a Grade II listed office building in London's primary financial district, the City of London.

== Location ==
Adelaide House is located on the north bank of the Thames, adjacent to London Bridge and St Magnus the Martyr church. It is on King William Street, and also borders the Thames Path and Thames Street.

== History ==
In the early 1830s, the old London Bridge Waterworks on the site was demolished and replaced with the Adelaide Hotel. The building was named in honour of King William IV's wife Adelaide, who, in 1831, had performed the opening ceremony of London Bridge. In the 1850s, the hotel was converted into offices and renamed the Adelaide Buildings.

In the early 1920s, the site was acquired by Richard Tilden Smith, who had the old Adelaide Buildings demolished to make way for a new office building. It was designed in the Art Deco style by Sir John Burnet and Thomas S. Tait, with some Egyptian influences, popular at the time after the recent discovery of Tutankhamen's tomb. The building features a sculpture by William Reid Dick above the main entrance, depicting a 3.2 metre high figure in draped materials carrying an orb with an astrological band.

When completed in 1925, it was the city's tallest office block, at 43 m (141 ft). Adelaide House was the first building in the city to employ the steel frame technique that was later widely adopted for skyscrapers around the world, and also the first office block in the United Kingdom to have central ventilation and telephone and electric connections on every floor. In addition, on opening the building featured a roof garden including an 18-hole putting course, rockeries, fruit trees and beehives.

The building has been Grade II listed since 1972. It was occupied by law firm Bryan Cave Leighton Paisner LLP from 1970 to 2020. In 2021, planning permission was granted to refurbish the building. Work on the refurbishment started in late 2023, with aims to renovate the building to category A office standard, including reopening the roof terrace area. Work was expected to be completed in early 2025.
