= Richard Smith (book collector) =

English book collector

- Born: 1590; Lillingstone Dayrell, England
- Died: 26 March 1675 (aged 84–85)
- Occupation: Book collector

Richard Smith, or Richard Smyth, (1590 – 26 March 1675) was an English book collector. He had a collection of over 8,000 books, manuscripts, and pamphlets.

== Biography ==
Ross was born in 1590. He was the son of the Rev. Richard Smith of Abingdon, Berkshire, by his wife Martha, daughter of Paul Dayrell, esq., of Lillingstone Dayrell, Buckinghamshire. He was born at Lillingstone Dayrell, and baptised there on 20 September 1590. He was sent for a short time to Oxford, but did not matriculate, and was afterwards articled to a solicitor in the city of London. On 15 October 1644 he was admitted to the office of secondary of the Poultry Compter, which was worth about 700l. a year. On the death of his eldest son, John, in 1655 he sold his office and lived in retirement, spending most of his time in his library. Wood says "he was constantly known every day to walk his rounds among the booksellers' shops (especially in Little Britain) in London, and by his great skill and experience he made choice of such books that were not obvious to every man's eye." He was also a great collector of manuscripts, and he annotated many of the books in his extensive library. For a long time he resided in Little Moorfields. He died on 26 March 1675, and was buried in the church of St. Giles, Cripplegate.

By his wife Elizabeth, daughter of George Dean of Stepney, Middlesex, he had five sons and three daughters.

His valuable library was dispersed by auction in 1682, and produced 1,414l. 12s. 11d. A copy of the sale catalogue, "Bibliotheca Smithiana," with manuscript prices, is preserved in the British Museum. A manuscript catalogue of his books, with notes and observations in his autograph (1670), appears in Thomas Thorpe's "Catalogue of Manuscripts," 1836, No. 104.

He is now chiefly known as the compiler of "The Obituary of Richard Smyth … being a catalogue of all such persons as he knew in their life: extending from A.D. 1627 to A.D. 1674;" which is extant in Sloane MS. in the British Museum, No. 886. A few extracts are preserved in the Harleian MS. 3361, in the handwriting of John Bagford; and a selection, perhaps to the amount of a fourth part, was printed by Francis Peck in his "Desiderata Curiosa." The whole work was edited by Sir Henry Ellis, K.H., for the Camden Society in 1849.

Smith was also author of "A Letter to Dr. Henry Hammond, concerning the Sence of that Article in the Creed, He descended into Hell," written in 1659, and printed, with Hammond's reply, London, 1684, 8vo. He left in manuscript a "Collection of Arms belonging to the name of Smith, in Colours," 8vo; such a collection, in 2 vols. 8vo, is now in the library of the College of Arms, but whether it be the same is not quite clear. Smith's manuscript remains also included "The Wonders of the World collected out of divers approved Authors;" Sloane MS. 388; "Of the First Invention of the Art of Printing," Sloane MS. 772; "Observations concerning the Three Grand Impostors," Sloane MS. 1024.

His portrait, engraved by William Sherwin, is very rare (Granger, Biogr. Hist. of England, 1824, v. 186).
