= Legal OnRamp =

OnRamp Systems is a legal technology company that specializes in applying people, process, and technology in support of corporate legal departments. OnRamp System’s collaborative platform, Legal OnRamp, has been cited by Harvard Law School as one of the first to combine law and technology.

== History ==
=== Online Community ===
In 2007, OnRamp Systems founded a free collaboration platform called Legal OnRamp, for in-house counsel and private practitioners to connect and share information virtually. Legal OnRamp featured many elements common to social networking websites, including message boards, blogs, databases, open and closed groups, calendars of professional events, and open forums for discussion and document sharing. Membership was by invitation and limited to attorneys and third-party legal service providers.

In 2014, Legal OnRamp re-launched its online platform updating some elements of the earlier site and incorporating more recently developed collaborative tools.

=== OnRamp and Legal Innovation ===
Led by its CEO Paul Lippe, Legal OnRamp is identified with innovation in the legal industry. Specifically, Legal OnRamp has been noted for unconventional approaches to large-scale legal projects, attorney training, and legal work product. In addition, Lippe writes for the American Bar Association Legal Rebels blog “the New Normal,” which discusses “how the practice of law is being remade.”

=== Industry Support and Alliances ===
Mark Chandler, General Counsel for CISCO Systems, encouraged Lippe to build the collaborative platform aimed at negotiating proper value for work. OnRamp has also garnered support from Allen & Overy, one of the UK’s “Magic Circle” firms. In 2009, The Corporate Executive Board Company began a strategic collaboration with OnRamp as part of an initiative to bring new resources to law department members of the General Counsel Roundtable. In 2010, the global law firm Orrick, Herrington & Sutcliffe LLP increased its investment in Legal OnRamp.

=== Development of Products and Services ===
Following the success of the Legal OnRamp collaboration platform, OnRamp Systems launched a number of private, enterprise-scale, collaboration platform projects. The OnRamp Exchange (ORX) system allows attorneys to collaborate with large teams as well as store and manage documents. The focus of these projects is on managing legal complexity at the systems and data level, instead of relying on complex reasoning.

=== Acquisition by Elevate ===
On April 28, 2016, Elevate announced that they purchased Legal onRamp.

== Products and services ==
OnRamp Systems Inc. offers large-scale legal analysis, hosted systems and applications, and planning and consulting services. Applications include Resolution Planning under the Dodd-Frank Act, contract analysis for revenue recognition, and other large-scale legal functions in compliance, vendor management, finance, contract system improvements, and transactional legal projects (e.g. mergers and acquisitions and bankruptcy). These projects may combine scaled services, process consulting, and technology elements.

=== MOLA ===
OnRamp employs a “Massive Online Legal Analysis” (or “MOLA”) approach to legal projects. The term “MOLA” refers to a methodology that systematizes legal tasks to allow limited expert resources to be applied to maximum legal work product. It is characterized by large numbers of precisely defined “data points” being analyzed by a large, distributed team of attorneys working together through a server-based workflow platform. MOLA systems are designed to allow data to be easily and independently verifiable, allowing quality to be monitored and corrected at scale.

=== OnRamp Exchange ===
OnRamp exchange is a web-scale, hosted technology platform (SaaS) that can be deployed as a stand-alone application or in support of MOLA services. It supports document management, collaboration features, productivity features, reporting, notifications and alerts, and permission controls.

== Industry Collaborations ==
=== Riverview Law ===
Riverview Law, a fixed-priced legal services business, provides Legal Advisory Outsourcing (LAO) services for OnRamp in the UK and partners with OnRamp Systems to provide services for global enterprises. Specifically, Riverview and OnRamp have partnered on projects relating to the regulatory requirements of Dodd-Frank related Recovery and Resolution Plans (RRP).

=== IBM Watson ===
Legal OnRamp is one of the first Ecosystem partners in law, assisting large banking institutions in complying with Dodd-Frank’s mandate for RRPs. OnRamp's goal is purported to help harness Watson's cognitive computing capabilities much in the way Watson has assisted Memorial Sloan Kettering in using its capacity to assist doctors in patient treatment plans.

== Bridge to Practice ==
OnRamp’s model includes services, and some are supported by their "Bridge to Practice" for new lawyers. Partnering directly with law schools, OnRamp offers an alternative to traditional legal career development paths by using large-scale legal projects as a legal training ground.

Twelve law schools were originally part of the OnRamp partnership. Law schools with which OnRamp has partnered include:

Boston College
Boston University
Emory University
Georgetown University
Harvard University
Michigan State University
New York University
Northeastern University
Northwestern University
Ohio State University
UC Hastings College of the Law
University of Colorado
University of Denver
University of Southern California
University of the Pacific
Vanderbilt University
