= Richard O'Kennedy =

Irish author and academic

Professor Richard O'Kennedy is an author and academic specializing in the production, characterisation and application of polyclonal, monoclonal and recombinant antibodies to different haptens and disease markers. Formerly at Dublin City University, where he directed the Biomedical Diagnostics Institute, he is vice president for research at Hamad Bin Khalifa University, a member of Qatar Foundation, as well as being the Science Patron (and former President) of the London International Youth Science Forum.

He has been a member of the Royal Irish Academy since 2014.

== Published works ==
Books by Richard O'Kennedy include:

- Coumarins: Biology, Applications and Mode of Action, Wiley, 1997.
