= Richard Tilden Smith =

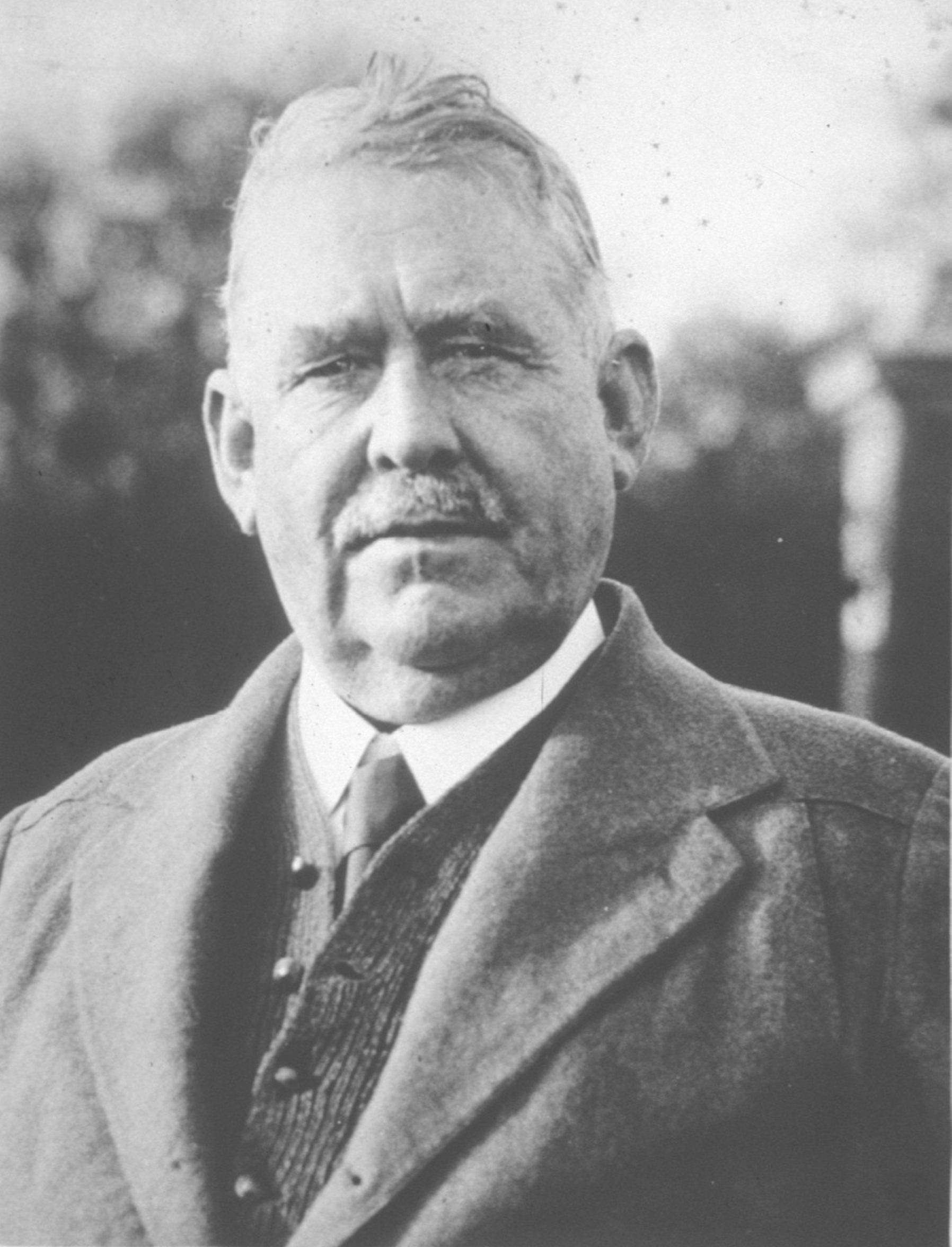
Richard Tilden Smith

Richard Tilden Smith (14 October 1865 – 18 December 1929) was a British businessman who made a fortune in mining in New South Wales and Western Australia and also had significant business interests in Britain.

Tilden Smith commissioned the pioneering steel-framed Adelaide House for his National Metal and Chemical Bank company. He died at the House of Commons and left £409,190.
