= R. Maclin Smith =

American politician (1906–1971)

Member of the Virginia House of Delegates from the Lunenburg, Nottoway, and portions of Amelia and Dinwiddie counties district
- In office 1954–1971

Personal details
- Born: Richard Maclin Smith; January 14, 1906 Brunswick County, Virginia, U.S.
- Died: December 11, 1971 (aged 65) Kenbridge, Virginia, U.S.
- Resting place: Kenbridge Cemetery
- Spouse: Annie Gee
- Children: 2
- Education: University of Richmond; Medical College of Virginia
- Occupation: Politician; pharmacist

Richard Maclin Smith (January 14, 1906 – December 11, 1971) was an American politician from Virginia. He served as a member of the Virginia House of Delegates from 1954 to 1971.

== Early life ==
Richard Maclin Smith was born on January 14, 1906, in Brunswick County, Virginia. He moved to Lunenburg County and attended Victoria High School in Victoria. He graduated from the University of Richmond and the Medical College of Virginia.

== Career ==
Smith practiced as a pharmacist in Kenbridge from 1930 until he retired in January 1971.

Smith served on the Kenbridge town council for 11 years. He served in the Virginia House of Delegates, representing Lunenburg, Nottoway, and portions of Amelia and Dinwiddie counties, from 1954 to 1971. He was chairman of the counties, cities and towns committee and vice chairman of the agricultural and the game and inland fisheries committees.

Smith was president of the Virginia Pharmaceutical Association. He was president of the Imperial Briquet Corporation of Kenbridge, director of the Bank of Lunenburg in Kenbridge and director of the Virginia Aberdeen Angus Association.

== Personal life ==
Smith married Annie Gee. He had a son and daughter, Richard M. Jr. and Mrs. James A. Kirkland. He was a Methodist.

Smith died of a heart attack while driving in Kenbridge on December 11, 1971. He was buried in Kenbridge Cemetery.
