= Smythe (disambiguation) =

Smythe is a surname, a less common spelling of the surname Smith.

Smythe may also refer to:

- Smythe, Indiana, an unincorporated community
- Mount Smythe, Jasper National Park, Canada
- Mount Smythe (British Columbia) in British Columbia, Canada
- Rockcliffe-Smythe, Toronto, Canada
- Smythe's Megalith, lost Neolithic tomb in Kent, England
- Smythe baronets
- Smythe Division of the National Hockey League

== See also ==
- Smith (disambiguation)
- Smith (surname)
- Smyth (surname)
