= Richard Smith (public historian) =

Public historian and writer

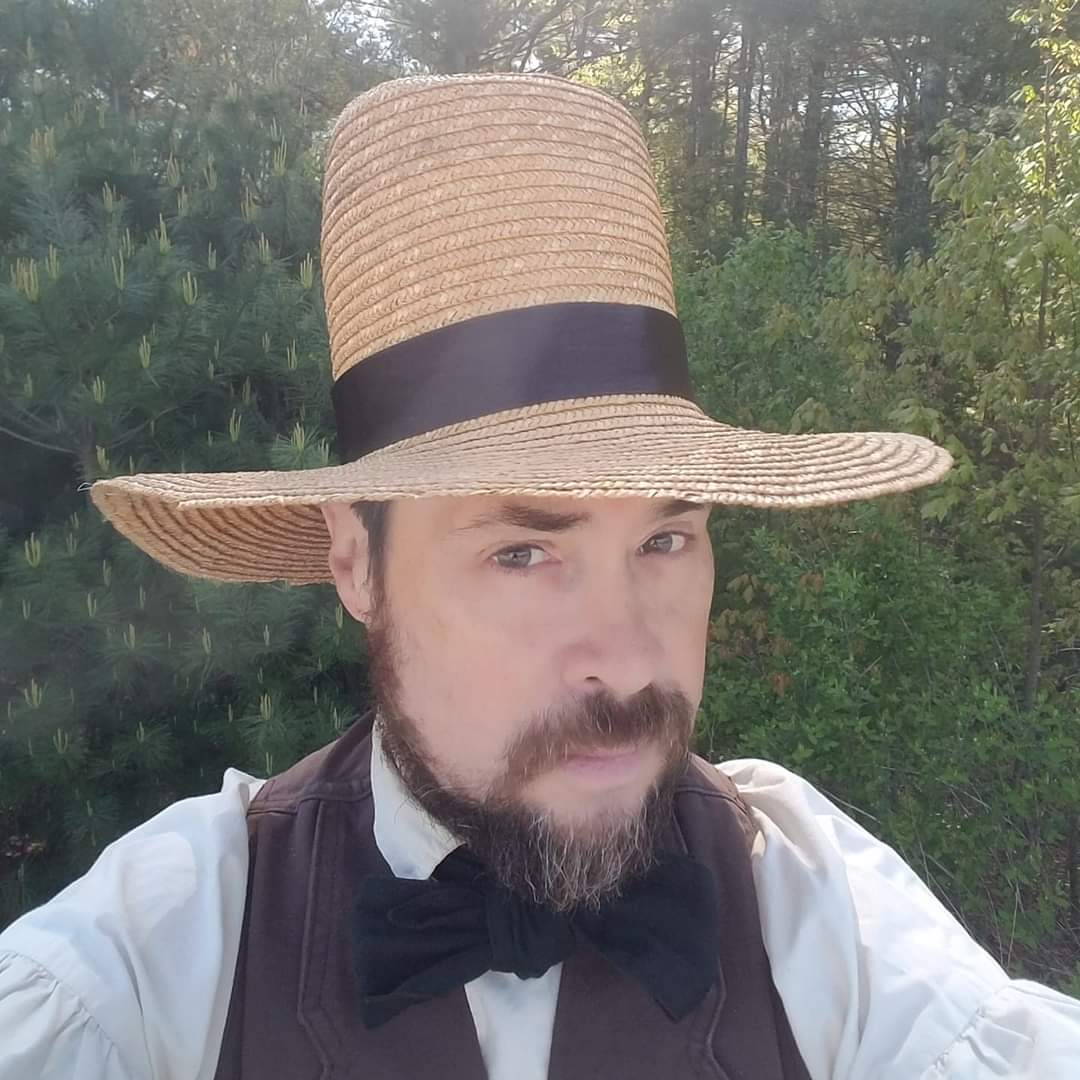
- Born: Cleveland, Ohio, US
- Education: University of Akron
- Occupations: Public historian living history interpreter
- Known for: Impersonation of Henry David Thoreau

Richard Smith is a public historian and writer known for his writings on New England history and for his living history interpretations of Henry David Thoreau.

== Personal life ==
Smith was born and raised in Cleveland, Ohio. According to the LA Review of Books, "Richard grew up 'obsessed' with 19th-century American history, and his supportive parents took him to battlefields and historic houses on family vacations." He graduated from the University of Akron with a B.A. in history in 1985. After college, he continued to study "the spiritual teachings of Native Americans" and Transcendentalists. In his spare time, he took part in re-enactments of the American Civil War and Revolutionary War, and performed with several punk rock bands.

== Career ==
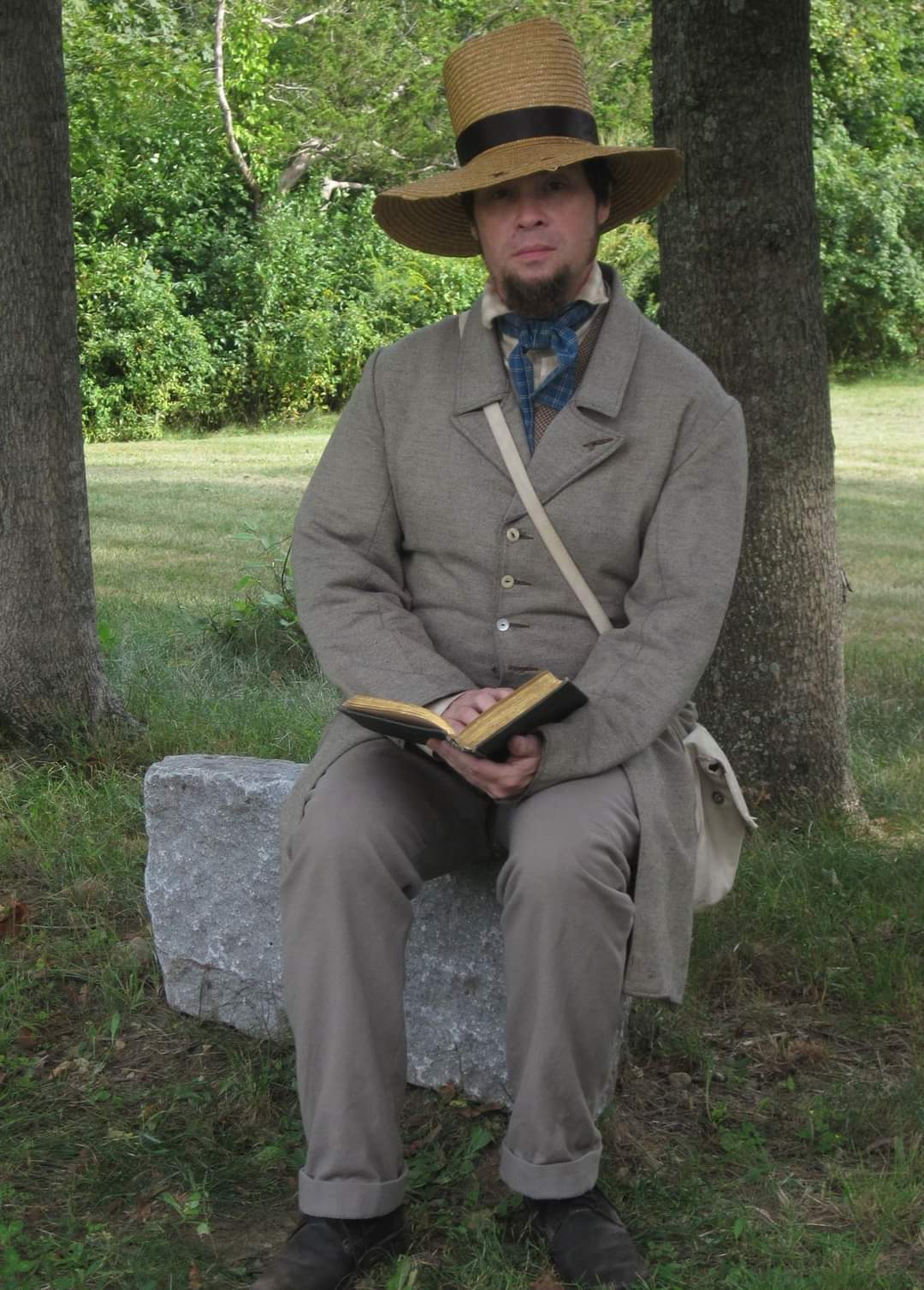
Richard Smith in costume as Thoreau

Smith began his career as a public historian while working "as" an Ohio schoolmaster of 1848 for an Akron living history museum. After reading about the life and works of Henry David Thoreau, Smith decided to visit Concord, Massachusetts, where he then moved a year later, in 1999.

Thoreau is just a small part of this radical, vibrant group of thinkers in the mid-19th century. People like Theodore Parker, or Margaret Fuller, or Lizzie Peabody. These people are all fighting for women's rights, they're fighting for African-Americans' rights. They're fighting for an end to unjust war.

— Richard Smith, "Becoming Thoreau" (2010)

In addition to writing and giving talks about his historical research, Smith also performed as a living history interpreter. In period costume as Henry David Thoreau, he gave public readings from Thoreau's works, responding in character as Thoreau to audience questions.

Explaining his interest in living history work, Smith told an interviewer (who wondered "if he might be the closest I'd get to a ghost") that "I want people to be aware of the fact that Thoreau was a living, breathing, funny, spiritual guy." Smith thinks of Thoreau not a peaceful hippie but as a rebel, or even "the first punk rocker. He didn't care what people thought. He questioned the government. Hippies tend to be peacemakers, peace and love. But Thoreau saw nothing wrong with someone like John Brown trying to violently end slavery."

At Thoreau-related sites such as Walden Pond or Sleepy Hollow Cemetery (Concord, Massachusetts), Smith also did tour-guiding, sometimes in character and costume. His talks and readings, either in costume as Thoreau or as himself, have taken place around New England and beyond, including work for C-SPAN and Public Radio's Living on Earth. He also expanded and presented his research on Native American history while he was scholar in residence at the Longfellow's Wayside Inn Museum.

He is the author of eight books, including Quotations of Henry David Thoreau (2017) and A Short Biography of John Muir (2018). He contributed a foreword to The Other 'Hermit' of Thoreau's Walden Pond: The Sojourn of Edmond Stuart Hotham.
