= Joseph Smyth =

Joseph Smyth may refer to:

- Joseph Capel Smyth (1830–1914), member of the Queensland Legislative Council
- Joseph Grigsby Smyth (1847–1915), Texan politician
- Joseph Hilton Smyth (1901–1972), American publisher and pulp author
- Joe Smyth (basketball) (1929–1999), American basketball player

== See also ==
- Joe Smyth (born 1985), British boxer
