= Rick Smith (author) =

American writer

Rick Smith is an American businessman and author.

Smith graduated from the University of Florida with a B.S. in Finance. and earned an M.B.A. in Marketing and Strategy from the Kellogg School of Management.

In 2003, Smith co-authored The 5 Patterns of Extraordinary Careers with James Citrin. In 2009, Smith published The Leap: How 3 Simple Changes Can Propel Your Career from Good to Great.

Smith was the founder and CEO of World 50, an executive networking company.
