= Malcolm Smyth =

Irish chemist

Professor Malcolm Smyth is an Irish chemist. He is also the dean of the Faculty of Science & Health at Dublin City University, in Dublin, Ireland. Smyth is also the president of the Analytical Division of the Royal Society of Chemistry (RSC) and is the first analytical chemist from the Republic of Ireland to hold the position. He has received awards from the Royal Society of Chemistry (RSC) and the SAC Gold Medal for Analytical Chemistry from the Analytical Division of the RSC.

== Career ==
Smyth obtained his BSc degree in biochemistry from the Queen's University of Belfast, Belfast, United Kingdom, in 1972, and his PhD in analytical chemistry from the University of London in 1976. He later conducted research as a postdoctoral fellow at Colorado State University between 1976 and 1978, and was subsequently employed as a visiting research scientist at the Nuclear Research Centre in Jülich, Germany, between 1979 and 1981. In 1981 Smyth was appointed to a lectureship in analytical chemistry at Dublin City University. He then became a senior lecturer at Dublin City University in 1985, and took over as head of the School of Chemical Sciences between 1990 and 1993. In 1990 Smyth was awarded the degree of Doctor of Science (DSc) from the Queen's University of Belfast. In 1992 he was appointed Professor of Chemistry at Dublin City University, and in 1995 took over as dean of the Faculty of Science & Health. Smyth is a Fellow of both the Royal Society of Chemistry and the Institute of Chemistry of Ireland and was elected member of the Royal Irish Academy (RIA).
