= Bryan Cave Leighton Paisner =

American law firm with 32 offices

- Headquarters: One Metropolitan Square; St. Louis, Missouri
- No. of offices: 31
- No. of attorneys: approx. 1200
- Major practice areas: Energy; Financial Services; Food & Agribusiness; Litigation & Dispute Resolution; M&A and Corporate Finance; Real Estate; Sports, Media & Entertainment
- Key people: Steve Baumer, CEO
- Revenue: $840 million (2024)
- Date founded: 1873
- Company type: Limited liability partnership
- Website: www.bclplaw.com

Bryan Cave Leighton Paisner LLP (BCLP) is an international law firm with 31 offices worldwide. BCLP is headquartered in St Louis, Missouri. BCLP states that it specializes in Real Estate, Tax, Finance, Corporate, Litigation & Corporate Risk and Transactions.

BCLP was formed in 2018 with the merger of St. Louis based Bryan Cave and the London firm Berwin Leighton Paisner. In 2024, the firm completed the formal transition from Bryan Cave Leighton Paisner to BCLP.

== History ==
=== Founding ===
BCLP was founded as Bryan Cave in 1873 in St. Louis.

In 2001, Bryan Cave opened their Chicago office. The next year, Bryan Cave and New York-based Robinson Silverman Pearce Aronsohn & Berman merged.

In 2005, Bryan Cave lost its Riyadh and Dubai offices to the Houston-based firm Fulbright & Jaworski, but retained its office in Kuwait. Offices were opened in Hamburg in 2007.

In 2008, Bryan Cave and Atlanta-based Powell Goldstein merged, creating an expanded firm with new offices in Atlanta, Charlotte, and Dallas. The Powell-Goldstein name was only retained in the firm’s Atlanta office for two-years.

Bryan Cave merged in 2012 with Holme Roberts & Owen (HRO), a law firm based in Denver, Colorado with over 210 attorneys.

In 2018, Bryan Cave’s partners voted to combine with Berwin Leighton Paisner.

=== Berwin Leighton Paisner ===
In 2001, Paisner & Co and Berwin Leighton merged to form Berwin Leighton Paisner. It specialized in real estate, finance, litigation and corporate risk, private wealth and tax.

In 2009 Berwin Leighton Paisner was joined by 70 lawyers in Moscow. Operations in Russia traded under the name of Goltsblat BLP.

=== BCLP ===
Bryan Cave and Berwin Leighton Paisner combined in 2018, with Lisa Mayhew and Therese Pritchard announced as Co-Chairs. In 2019, Pritchard stepped down as Co-Chair, with Steve Baumer elected as her replacement.

BCLP closed its 200-person Moscow office in 2022 following the Russian invasion of Ukraine.

In 2023, BCLP moved to a single leadership structure, with Baumer elected as the new Global CEO.

In 2023, Jeff Haidet, who previously was co-chair of Dentons US, joined BCLP as a partner. Fifteen lawyers specializing in intellectual property moved from Dentons to BCLP.

In 2024, BCLP absorbed Seattle firm Harrigan Leyh Farmer & Thomsen.

In 2025, BCLP opened two offices in Saudi Arabia: Riyadh and Al Khobar. The company also announced that it would be withdrawing from Asia, closing its Hong Kong and Singapore offices.

== Notable transactions ==
BCLP represented Ralcorp in the 2007 $2.6 billion merger between Ralcorp and Kraft Foods' portfolio of cereals under the Post Cereal label.

In 2008, the company advised Monsanto in its $290 million purchase of Aly Participacoes, a division of Brazilian global conglomerate Votorantim Group. Aly Participacoes operated two companies, CanaVialis S.A. and Alellyx S.A. which focus on sugarcane breeding and related applied genomics and biotech in the sugarcane industry.

In 2025, BCLP, alongside Pinsent Masons, began advising Thames Water on its plans to build The Abingdon Reservoir in Oxfordshire.
