= Richard F. Smith =

American business executive (born c. 1961)

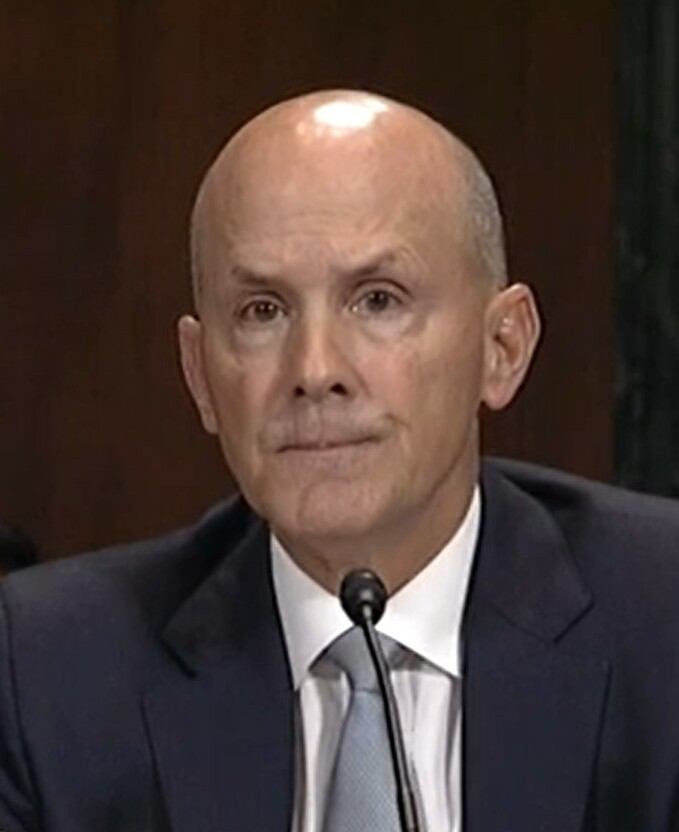
- Smith in 2017
- Born: 1960 or 1961 (age 65–66)
- Education: Purdue University
- Occupation: Business executive
- Known for: Former chairman & CEO of Equifax
- Board member of: DocuSign

Richard F. Smith (born c. 1961) is an American business executive. He served as the chairman and chief executive officer of Equifax from 2005 to 2017.

== Early life ==
Smith was born circa 1961. He graduated from Purdue University.

== Career ==
Smith worked at General Electric for two decades. He served as the chairman and CEO of Equifax from 2005 to 2017, when he retired in the wake of the data breach of approximately 145.5 million customers. Because Smith retired instead of getting fired, he is expected to receive $90 million, including performance-based unvested stocks and $18.5 in retirement benefits, according to Fortune.

Smith serves on the advisory board of DocuSign.
